= Samuel West =

British actor, theatre director, and narrator (born 1966)

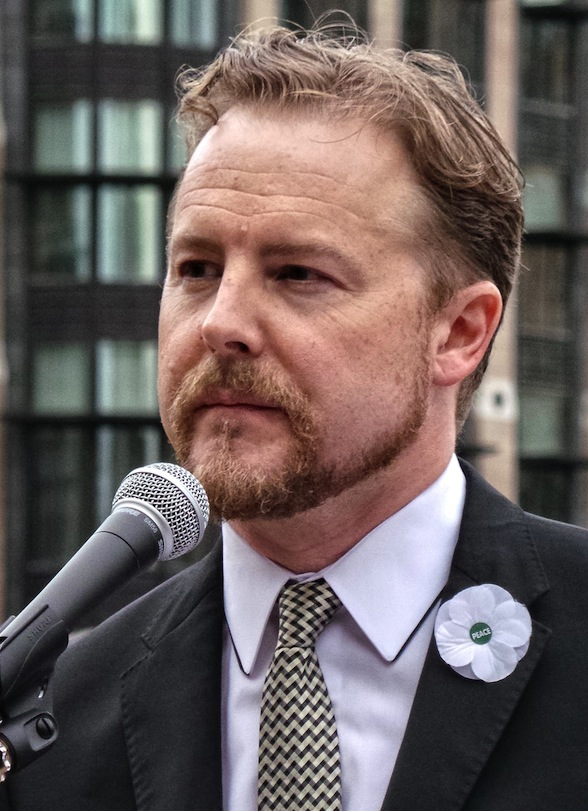
- West in 2014
- Born: Samuel Alexander Joseph West; 19 June 1966 (age 60); Hammersmith, London, England
- Occupations: Actor; theatre director; narrator
- Years active: 1975–present
- Partner: Laura Wade
- Children: 2
- Parent(s): Timothy West; Prunella Scales
- Relatives: Lockwood West (grandfather)

Samuel Alexander Joseph West (born 19 June 1966) is an English actor, theatre director, and narrator. He has directed on stage and radio, and worked as an actor in theatre, film, television, and radio.

West was nominated for the BAFTA Award for Best Actor in a Supporting Role for his portrayal of Leonard Bast in the Merchant Ivory film adaptation of E. M. Forster's novel Howards End (1992), and was later nominated for the Genie Award for Best Performance by an Actor in a Leading Role for his portrayal of the title role in Rupert's Land (1998). In 2010, he was nominated for the Laurence Olivier Award for Best Actor for his portrayal of Jeffrey Skilling in Lucy Prebble's Enron. He has appeared as reciter with orchestras and performed at the Last Night of the Proms. He has narrated several documentary series, including five for the BBC about the Second World War.

West stars as Siegfried Farnon in the Channel 5 remake of the veterinary drama series All Creatures Great and Small.

== Early life and education ==
Samuel Alexander Joseph West was born on 19 June 1966 in Hammersmith, London, the elder son of the actress Prunella Scales and the actor Timothy West, and the grandson of the actor Lockwood West.

West was educated at Alleyn's School and Lady Margaret Hall, Oxford, where he studied English literature and was president of the Experimental Theatre Club. West originally intended to attend Webber Douglas Academy of Dramatic Art, but chose instead to focus on his career after he was cast as King Caspian in the BBC's 1989 series The Voyage of the Dawn Treader.

== Career ==
=== Stage ===
West made his London stage debut in February 1989 at the Orange Tree Theatre, playing Michael in Cocteau's Les Parents Terribles, of which critic John Thaxter wrote: "He invests the role with a warmth and validity that silences sniggers that could so easily greet a lesser performance of this difficult role, and he lets us share the tumbling emotions of a juvenile torn between romantic first love and filial duty." Since then, West has appeared frequently on stage; he played Valentine in the first production of Tom Stoppard's Arcadia at the National Theatre in 1993, and later spent two seasons with the Royal Shakespeare Company playing the title roles in Richard II and Hamlet, both directed by Steven Pimlott.

In 2002, West made his stage directorial debut with The Lady's Not for Burning at the Minerva Theatre, Chichester. He succeeded Michael Grandage as artistic director of Sheffield Theatres from 2005 to 2007. During his time as artistic director, West revived the controversial The Romans in Britain, and also directed As You Like It as part of the RSC's Complete Works Festival. West left Sheffield when the theatre closed for refurbishment in 2007, and made his West End directorial debut with the first major revival of Dealer's Choice following its transferral to the Trafalgar Studios. He also continued his acting career: in 2007 he appeared alongside Toby Stephens and Dervla Kirwan in Betrayal at the Donmar Warehouse.

In 2008, West played Harry in the Donmar revival of T. S. Eliot's Family Reunion, and in 2009 he starred as Jeffrey Skilling in Enron by Lucy Prebble. His 2008 production of Waste at the Almeida Theatre was chosen by The Times as one of its "Productions of the Decade". From November 2012 to January 2013, he appeared as Astrov in a production of Uncle Vanya at the Vaudeville Theatre. He played Ivanov and Trigorin in the Chichester Festival Theatre's Young Chekhov Season from September 2015, alongside Nina Sosanya, Anna Chancellor, and James McArdle.

In 2023, West played Hugh Delavois in Adrian Edmondson and Nigel Planer's comedy play It’s Headed Straight Towards Us at the Park Theatre, London opposite Rufus Hound. In late 2024, West returned to the Royal Shakespeare Company to play Malvolio in Prasanna Puwanarajah's production of Twelfth Night opposite Gwyneth Keyworth, Freema Agyeman and Bally Gill. He will reprise the role in late 2025 as the production transfers to the Barbican Centre, London.

=== Film ===
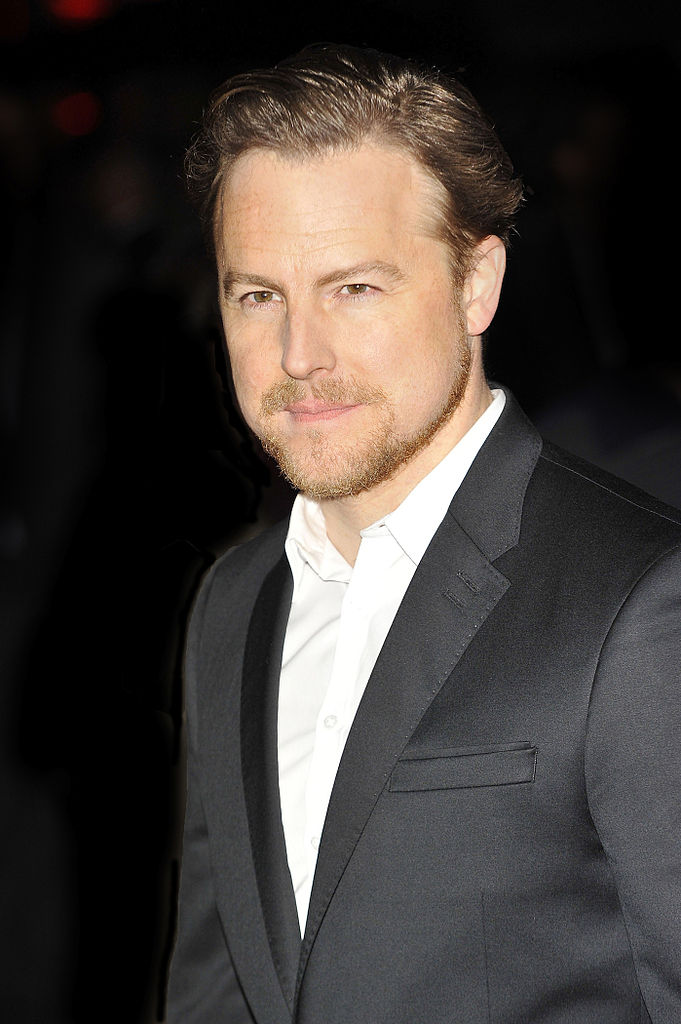
West at the London Film Festival screening of Hyde Park on Hudson in 2012

West appeared in the film Reunion (1989) with Jason Robards and Christien Anholt as an aristocratic boy who befriends the son of a Jewish doctor in 1930s Germany. West played the lower-middle-class clerk Leonard Bast in the Merchant Ivory film adaptation of E. M. Forster's novel Howards End (1992), featuring Emma Thompson, Helena Bonham Carter, and Anthony Hopkins. For this role, he was nominated for best supporting actor at the 1993 BAFTA Film Awards. West appeared with Thompson again in the film Carrington (1995).

In voice-over, West provided the voice of Pongo in 101 Dalmatians II: Patch's London Adventure, replacing Rod Taylor.

West's film career has continued with roles in films such as Franco Zeffirelli's Jane Eyre, Notting Hill, Iris, Van Helsing and Darkest Hour. In 2004, he appeared in the year's highest rated mini-series on German television, Die Nibelungen, which was released in the United States in 2006 as Dark Kingdom: The Dragon King. In 2012, he played King George VI in Hyde Park on Hudson.

=== Television ===
West has appeared in many long-running series: Midsomer Murders, Waking the Dead and Poirot, as well as one-off dramas. He played Anthony Blunt in Cambridge Spies, a BBC production about the four British spies, starring alongside Toby Stephens (Philby), Tom Hollander (Burgess) and Rupert Penry-Jones (Maclean). He reprised his role as Blunt in "Olding", the premiere episode of the third season of The Crown released in 2019.

In 2006, West took the lead role in a BBC production of Random Quest adapted from the short story by John Wyndham and the next year played Edward Heath in Margaret Thatcher – The Long Walk to Finchley, also for the BBC. In 2010 he played Peter Scabius in the televised adaptation of William Boyd's novel Any Human Heart, while in 2011 he starred as Zak Gist in the ITV series Eternal Law. In addition, he appeared in the BBC sitcom As Time Goes By, as Terry in the episode "We'll Always Have Paris" (1994).

West played Frank Edwards in the ITV drama Mr Selfridge, and Sir Walter Pole in the 2015 BBC adaptation of Jonathan Strange and Mr Norrell.

West stars in the Channel Five series (broadcast in September 2020) All Creatures Great and Small as Siegfried Farnon. A second six-episode season and Christmas special was broadcast in 2021, followed by a third season airing in late 2022. As of 2026, it has run for seven seasons, the most recent season airing in the UK in September 2026. The seventh season is scheduled to air in America in January 2027.

Since 2022, West has appeared as Peter Judd MP, a "ruthlessly ambitious" right-wing Conservative politician who is later promoted to Home Secretary, in five seasons of the popular spy drama Slow Horses, which also stars Gary Oldman, Jack Lowden, Kristin Scott Thomas, Jonathan Pryce, and Saskia Reeves.

=== Radio ===
West is regularly heard on radio as a reader or reciter and has performed in many radio dramas, including Otherkin by Laura Wade, Present Laughter by Noël Coward, Len Deighton's Bomber, Life and Fate by Vasily Grossman, Michael Frayn's Here, The Meaning of Zong by Giles Terera and The Homecoming as Lenny to Harold Pinter's Max. In 2011, he made his radio directing debut with a production of Money by Edward Bulwer-Lytton on BBC Radio 3.

== Personal life ==
West appeared alongside his actor parents on several occasions: with his mother Prunella Scales in Howards End and Stiff Upper Lips, and with his father Timothy West on stage in A Number, Henry IV, Part 1 and Part 2. In two films (Iris in 2001 and the 1996 television film Over Here), Sam and his father played the same character at different ages.

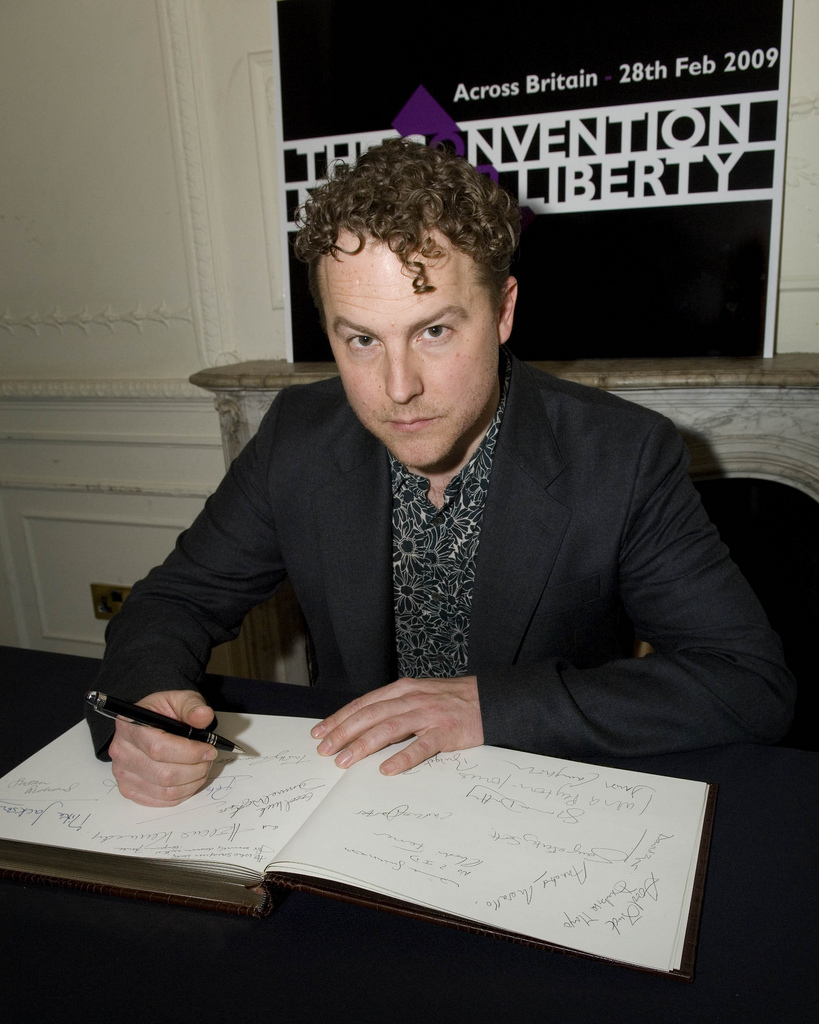
West in 2010

In Edward the Seventh (1975), West and his brother Joseph played young sons of the title character, who was played by their father. In 2002, all three family members performed in Stravinsky's The Soldier's Tale at the St Magnus Festival on Orkney, and in 2006 they gave a rehearsed reading of the Harold Pinter play Family Voices as part of the Sheffield Theatres Pinter season.

West became the patron of Sheffield Philharmonic Chorus in February 2008, having been the narrator for a concert of theirs in February 2002. He is also a patron of London children's charity Scene & Heard, Eastside Educational Trust and Mousetrap Theatre Projects.

While at university, West was a member of the Socialist Workers Party, and later briefly the Socialist Alliance. West was an outspoken critic of the New Labour government of Tony Blair and their involvement in the Iraq War. On 26 March 2011, West spoke at the TUC March for the Alternative.

West has written essays on Richard II for the Cambridge University Press series Players of Shakespeare, on Hamlet for Michael Dobson's CUP study Performing Shakespeare's Tragedies Today and on Shakespeare and Love and Voice and Radio for BBC Radio 3.

West has also published articles on Harold Pinter, Caryl Churchill and the Shipping Forecast. He frequently writes and speaks in public about arts funding. West has collected stamps since childhood and owns more than 200 Two Shilling Blues.

In 2013, West was one of the judges for the Forward Prizes for Poetry. In December 2014, he appeared on two programmes for Christmas University Challenge, as part of a team of alumni from Lady Margaret Hall, Oxford.

West is an Associate Artist of the Royal Shakespeare Company and a trustee and previous Chair of the Campaign for the Arts. He was a member of the council of the British Actors' Union Equity from 1996 to 2000 and 2008–2014. He is a keen birdwatcher, and an Ambassador for the Royal Society for the Protection of Birds.

In 2007, West began living with playwright Laura Wade, but in 2011 the couple temporarily split up. In 2013, West was cast in a minor role in The Riot Club, the film version of Wade's play, Posh, and in 2014 the couple had a daughter. In August 2017, the couple had a second daughter.

West is a supporter of AFC Wimbledon.

West is a patron of the Wilfred Owen Association, which commemorates Owen's life and poetry.

== Performances and works ==
=== Film ===
| Year | Film | Role | Notes |
|---|---|---|---|
| 1989 | Reunion | Count Konradin von Lohenburg | |
| 1992 | Howards End | Leonard Bast | Nominated for BAFTA Award for Best Supporting Actor |
| 1993 | Archipel | Alan Stewart | In French |
| 1994 | Open Fire | Steven Waldorf | |
| 1995 | A Feast at Midnight | Chef | |
| 1995 | The Vacillations of Poppy Carew | Victor | TV film |
| 1995 | Carrington | Gerald Brenan | |
| 1995 | Persuasion | Mr. Elliot | |
| 1995 | Zoya | Nicolai | TV film |
| 1995 | Heavy Weather | 'Monty' Bodkin | TV film |
| 1996 | Jane Eyre | St. John Rivers | |
| 1997 | The Ripper | Prince Albert Victor Edward | TV film |
| 1998 | Stiff Upper Lips | Edward | |
| 1998 | Rupert's Land | Rupert McKay | Nominated for Genie Award for Best Actor |
| 1998 | The Dance of Shiva | Lt. Davis | Short film |
| 1999 | Notting Hill | Anna's Co-Star | |
| 1999 | Runt | Pork | Short film |
| 2000 | Bread and Roses | as himself (cameo) | |
| 2000 | Complicity | Neil | |
| 2000 | Bring Me Your Love | Doctor Jensen | Short film |
| 2000 | Pandaemonium | Robert Southey | |
| 2001 | Iris | Young Maurice | |
| 2002 | Shrink | George | Short film |
| 2003 | 101 Dalmatians II: Patch's London Adventure | Pongo | Voice only |
| 2004 | Van Helsing | Dr. Victor Frankenstein | |
| 2004 | Curse of the Ring | King Gunther | TV film |
| 2006 | Random Quest | Colin Trafford | TV film |
| 2008 | The Long Walk to Finchley | Ted Heath | TV film |
| 2009 | Albert Schweitzer | Phil Figgis | |
| 2010 | Dark Relic | Friar George | TV film |
| 2012 | Hyde Park on Hudson | King George VI | |
| 2014 | The Riot Club | Tutor | |
| 2015 | Suffragette | Benedict | |
| 2015 | The Eichmann Show | Narrator | TV film |
| 2017 | On Chesil Beach | Geoffrey Ponting | |
| 2017 | Darkest Hour | Sir Anthony Eden | |
| 2019 | The Gentlemen | Lord Pressfield | |

=== Television ===
| Year | Title | Role | Notes |
|---|---|---|---|
| 1975 | Edward the Seventh | Albert Victor 'Eddy' – Aged 5 | Episode 6: "The Invisible Queen" |
| 1981 | Nanny | James Lamerton | Series 1, Episode 6: "Goats and Tigers" |
| 1985 | Screen Two | Johnnie Mallett | Series 2, Episode 4: "Frankie and Johnnie" |
| 1989 | The Voyage of the Dawn Treader | King Caspian | |
| 1991 | Stanley and the Women | Stephen Duke | |
| 1993 | Screen Two | Mark | Series 9, Episode 8: "Voices in the Garden" |
| 1993 | The Inspector Alleyn Mysteries | Donald Potter | Series 1, Episode 5: "Death in a White Tie" |
| 1993 | Performance | Jack Maitland | Series 3, Episode 2: "The Maitlands" |
| 1993 | Doctor Who: Dimensions in Time | Cyrian | |
| 1994 | As Time Goes By | Terry | Series 3, Episode 1: "We'll Always Have Paris" |
| 1994 | Screen One | Lt. Charles Thoroughgood | Series 6, Episode 2: "A Breed of Heroes" |
| 1996 | Strangers | Simon | Series 1, Episode 10: "Costumes" |
| 1996 | Over Here | Archie Bunting | |
| 1997 | The Nazis: A Warning from History | Narrator | |
| 1999 | Hornblower | Major Edrington | Series 1, Episode 4: "The Frogs and the Lobsters" |
| 1999 | The Planets | Narrator | |
| 1999 | Living Britain | Narrator | |
| 1999 | War of the Century: When Hitler Fought Stalin | Narrator | |
| 2000 | Longitude | Nevil Maskelyne | |
| 2001 | Horror in the East | Narrator | |
| 2001–2002 | Timewatch | Narrator | |
| 2002 | Waking the Dead | Thomas Rice | Series 1, Episodes 1–2: "Life Sentence" |
| 2002–2006 | The Private Life of a Masterpiece | Narrator | |
| 2003 | Cambridge Spies | Anthony Blunt | |
| 2003 | Imagine | Wightwick | Series 2, Episode 3: "Entertaining Mr. Soane" |
| 2004 | Foyle's War | Lt. Col. James Wintringham | Series 3, Episode 1: "The French Drop" |
| 2005 | Nova | Humphry Davy | Series 33, Episode 3: "E=mc²: Einstein's Big Idea" |
| 2005 | Auschwitz: The Nazis and 'The Final Solution' | Narrator | |
| 2006 | The Inspector Lynley Mysteries | Tony Wainwright | Series 5, Episode 3: "Chinese Walls" |
| 2007 | Midsomer Murders | Jeremy Thacker | Series 10, Episode 2: "The Animal Within" |
| 2008 | World War II Behind Closed Doors: Stalin, the Nazis and the West | Narrator | |
| 2009 | New Tricks | David Fleeting | Series 6, Episode 3: "Fresh Starts" |
| 2009 | Desperate Romantics | Lord Rosterley | Series 1, Episode 4 |
| 2010 | Garrow's Law | Thomas Erskine | Series 2, Episode 4 |
| 2010 | Any Human Heart | Peter Scabius | Series 1, Episodes 1–4 |
| 2010 | Agatha Christie's Poirot | Dr Constantine | Series 12, Episode 3: "Murder on the Orient Express" |
| 2011 | Law & Order: UK | Lucas Boyd | Series 5, Episode 5: "Intent" |
| 2012 | Eternal Law | Zak Gist | |
| 2012–15 | Mr Selfridge | Frank Edwards | Character based on journalist and publisher Frank Harris |
| 2014 | Fleming: The Man Who Would Be Bond | Admiral John Godfrey | Character was Ian Fleming's model for "M" |
| 2014 | The Crimson Field | Elliot Vincent | Series 1, Episode 4 |
| 2015 | W1A | Richard Cartwright | Series 2, Episode 1 |
| 2015 | Jonathan Strange & Mr Norrell | Sir Walter Pole | |
| 2016 | The Hollow Crown: The Wars of the Roses | Bishop of Winchester | Henry VI Part 1 |
| 2017 | Midsomer Murders | James Oswood | Episode: "Death by Persuasion" |
| 2019 | The Crown | Anthony Blunt | Season 3, episode 1 "Olding" |
| 2020 | Death in Paradise | Donald McCormack | Series 9, Episode 1 |
| 2020– | All Creatures Great and Small | Siegfried Farnon | |
| 2022– | Slow Horses | Peter Judd | Recurring cast |
| 2022 | The Midwich Cuckoos | Bernard Westcott | Series 1, Episodes 2, 4-7 |
| 2026 | Sam and Ade Go Birding | Himself – Co-presenter | Three-part wildlife series with Adrian Edmondson |

West narrated the Yorkshire Television documentary The SS in Britain for director Julian Hendy in 1999, and considering his role in the ITV drama series Mr Selfridge, he was the voiceover for Secrets of Selfridges (PBS) in 2014.

=== Audio drama ===
| Year | Title | | Role | Notes |
|---|---|---|---|---|
| 2008 | Doctor Who – The Eighth Doctor Adventures | "The Vengeance of Morbius" | Morbius | Re-released in 2024 as part of The Eighth Doctor and Lucie Miller Series 2 |
| 2014 | Doctor Who – The Monthly Adventures | "Mask of Tragedy" | Aristophanes | |
| 2015 | The Diary of River Song Series 1 | "I Went to a Marvellous Party" & "Signs" | Mr Song | |
| 2018 | Doctor Who – The Monthly Adventures | "Serpent in the Silver Mask" | The Mazzini Family | |
| 2024 | Dark Gallifrey | "Morbius" | Morbius | |
| 2024 | Doctor Who: The War Doctor Rises | "Morbius the Mighty" | Morbius | |

=== Theatre ===
==== Acting ====
- The Browning Version: Taplow (1985) – directed by Clive Perry (Birmingham Repertory Theatre)
- Les Parents terribles: Michael (February 1989) – directed by Derek Goldby (Orange Tree Theatre)
- The Bread-Winner (1989) – directed by Kevin Billington, (Theatre Royal, Windsor and touring)
- A Life in the Theatre (October 1989 – February 1990) – directed by Bill Bryden, (Theatre Royal Haymarket, transferred to Strand Theatre)
- Hidden Laughter: Nigel (June 1990) – directed by Simon Gray (Vaudeville Theatre)
- The Sea: Willy Carson (1991) – directed by Sam Mendes (Royal National Theatre)
- Cain (1992) – directed by Edward Hall (Minerva Theatre)
- Mr. Cinders A Musical Comedy: Jim Lancaster (December 1992 – February 1993) – directed by Martin Connor (King's Head Theatre)
- Arcadia: Valentine (April–November 1993) – directed by Trevor Nunn (Royal National Theatre)
- The Importance of Being Earnest: Algernon – directed by James Maxwell (Royal Exchange Theatre)
- Henry IV Part 1 and Part 2: Hal (1996–1997) – directed by Stephen Unwin (English Touring Theatre)
- Journey's End: Captain Stanhope (January–February 1998) – directed by David Evans-Rees (King's Head Theatre)
- Antony and Cleopatra: Octavius Caesar (1998) – directed by Sean Mathias (Royal National Theatre)
- Richard II: Richard II (2000) – directed by Steven Pimlott, (RSC)
- Hamlet: Hamlet (2001) – directed by Steven Pimlott, (RSC)
- The Master and Margarita: The Master (2004) – directed by Steven Pimlott (Chichester Festival Theatre)
- Doctor Faustus: Faustus (2004) – directed by Steven Pimlott, Martin Duncan and Edward Kemp, (Minerva Theatre)
- Much Ado About Nothing: Benedick (2005) – directed by Josie Rourke (Crucible Theatre)
- The Exonerated: Kerry Max Cook (2006) – directed by Bob Balaban (Riverside Studios)
- A Number: B1/B2/Michael Black (2006) – directed by Jonathan Munby, (Studio Theatre (Sheffield) and Minerva Theatre)
- Betrayal: Robert (2007) – directed by Roger Michell (Donmar Warehouse)
- Drunk Enough to Say I Love You?: Guy (2008) – directed by James McDonald, (Public Theater, New York)
- The Family Reunion: Harry (2008) – directed by Jeremy Herrin (Donmar Warehouse)
- ENRON: Jeffrey Skilling (2009) – directed by Rupert Goold, (Minerva Theatre, Royal Court Theatre, Noël Coward Theatre)
- A Number (revival): B1/B2/Michael Black (2010) – directed by Jonathan Munby, (Menier Chocolate Factory)
- Kreutzer vs. Kreutzer: Man (2010) – directed by Sarah Giles, (Australian Chamber Orchestra – on tour and at the Sydney Opera House)
- A Number (revival): B1/B2/Michael Black (2011) – directed by Jonathan Munby, (Fugard Theatre, Cape Town)
- Uncle Vanya: Astrov (2012) – directed by Lindsay Posner (Vaudeville Theatre)
- Young Chekhov: Ivanov in Ivanov and Trigorin in The Seagull (2015) – directed by Jonathan Kent (Chichester Festival Theatre)
- Julius Caesar: Brutus (2017) – directed by Robert Hastie, (Crucible Theatre)
- The Writer, directed by Blanche McIntyre, at the Almeida Theatre, London (April 2018)
- It’s Headed Straight Towards Us: Hugh Delavois (2023), directed by Rachel Kavanaugh (Park Theatre)
- Twelfth Night: Malvolio (2024-2025), directed by Prasanna Puwanarajah, (RSC and Barbican Centre)
- Twelfth Night: Malvolio (2025-2026), directed by Prasanna Puwanarajah, (RSC and Barbican Centre)

==== Directing ====
- The Lady's Not for Burning (2002), Minerva Theatre
- Les Liaisons Dangereuses (2003), Bristol Old Vic
- Cosi Fan Tutte (2003), English National Opera at Barbican Theatre
- Three Women and a Piano Tuner (2004), Minerva Theatre and Hampstead Theatre (2005)
- Insignificance (2005), Lyceum Theatre (Sheffield)
- The Romans in Britain (2006), Crucible Theatre
- The Clean House (2006), Studio Theatre (Sheffield)
- As You Like It (2007), Crucible Theatre and Swan Theatre (Stratford)
- Dealer's Choice (2007), Menier Chocolate Factory and Trafalgar Studios
- Waste (2008), Almeida Theatre
- Close the Coalhouse Door (2012), Northern Stage
- After Electra (2015), Theatre Royal, Plymouth and Tricycle Theatre
- The Watsons (2018 Minerva Theatre, Chichester)

=== Radio ===
==== Acting ====
- Grantchester: Series 4, ep 1 (2019) PBS Professor Blakely
- High Table, Lower Orders (2005–06), BBC Radio 4

==== Directing ====
- Money (2011), BBC Radio 3
- Close the Coalhouse Door (2012), BBC Radio 4

=== Audiobooks, reciting and work with musicians ===
West has recorded over one hundred audiobooks, among which are the Shakespeare plays All's Well That Ends Well, Coriolanus, Henry V, The Merchant of Venice, A Midsummer Night's Dream, Much Ado About Nothing, Richard II and Macbeth (directed by Steven Berkoff), the complete Inspector Morse novels by Colin Dexter, the Wind on Fire trilogy by William Nicholson (The Wind Singer, Slaves of the Mastery and Firesong), the Arthur trilogy by Kevin Crossley-Holland (The Seeing Stone, At the Crossing Places and King of the Middle March), five books by Sebastian Faulks (Charlotte Gray, Birdsong, The Girl at the Lion d'Or, Human Traces and A Possible Life), four by Michael Ridpath (Trading Reality, Final Venture, Free to Trade, and The Marketmaker), two by George Orwell (Nineteen Eighty-Four and Homage to Catalonia), two by Mary Wesley (An Imaginative Experience and Part of the Furniture), two by Robert Goddard (Closed Circle and In Pale Battalions) and several compilations of poetry (Realms of Gold: Letters and Poems of John Keats, Bright Star, The Collected Works of Shelley, Seven Ages, Great Narrative Poems of the Romantic Age and A Shropshire Lad). Also Faust, Bomber, Doctor Who: The Vengeance of Morbius, Empire of the Sun and Brighton Rock.

In June 2012, West recorded an English narration of The Book about Moomin, Mymble and Little My by Tove Jansson for an interactive audiobook developed by Spinfy and published by Sort of Books.

In May 2015, West's reading of Brighton Rock was chosen as one of "The 20 best audiobooks of all time" by Carole Mansur of the Daily Telegraph.

As a reciter West has worked with all the major British orchestras, as well as the Strasbourg Philharmonic Orchestra, Dallas Symphony Orchestra and the National Symphony Orchestra in Washington, D.C. Works include Stravinsky's Oedipus Rex and The Soldier's Tale, Prokofiev's Eugene Onegin, Beethoven's Egmont, Schoenburg's Ode To Napoleon, Strauss' Enoch Arden, Saint-Saëns' Carnival of the Animals, Bernstein's Kaddish, Walton's Façade and Henry V, Night Mail and The Way to the Sea by Britten and Auden, the world premieres of Concrete by Judith Weir at the Barbican and Howard Goodall's Jason and the Argonauts at the Royal Albert Hall and the UK premiere of Jonathan Harvey's final piece Weltethos at the Symphony Hall, Birmingham. In 2007 West made his New York recital debut in the first performance of Little Red Violin by Anne Dudley and Steven Isserlis. In November 2010, West performed a new English translation of Grieg's complete incidental music to Ibsen's play Peer Gynt with the Southampton Philharmonic Choir at Southampton Guildhall. He has performed at the Proms six times, including the suite version of Henry V at the 2002 Last Night of the Proms.

He has also appeared with the Nash Ensemble, the Raphael Ensemble, The Hebrides Ensemble, Ensemble 360 and the Lindsay, Dante and Endellion Quartets at the Wigmore Hall, London. Recordings include Prokofief's Eugene Onegin with Sinfonia 21 and Edward Downes, Salad Days and Walton's Henry V with the BBC Symphony Orchestra and Leonard Slatkin.

As a choral singer, West has participated in three Choir of London tours to Palestine: in May 2006, when he also gave poetry readings as part of the concert programme; in April 2007 when he directed The Magic Flute. and in September 2013 (see below).

In 2013, the centenary year of Benjamin Britten, West narrated the Britten/Auden film score Night Mail with the Nash Ensemble at the Wigmore Hall and later added Coal Face, God's Chillun, The Peace of Britain, The Way to the Sea and The King's Stamp with the Aurora Orchestra at the Queen Elizabeth and Fairfield Halls. In June he played God in Britten's Noye's Fludde in Harrogate. In July he appeared in a Proms Plus broadcast discussing Britten's setting of poetry. In September he toured Palestine with the Choir of London as staff director of a new opera based on Britten's Hymn to St Cecilia and sang in Britten's St Nicolas. In October, he narrated the concert world premiere of Britten in America for the Hallé orchestra, which was released on CD together with West's recordings of speeches to Britten's incidental music for Auden and Isherwood's play The Ascent of F6 (the disc, Britten to America, was later nominated for a 2014 Grammy Award for Best Classical Compendium). He also toured a program of Britten cabaret songs and Auden poems across the UK with Ruthie Culver and the UtterJazz Quartet.

In June 2013 he appeared in the video for Handyman Blues by Billy Bragg, directed by Johnny Vegas.

On 14 July 2017, one month after the Grenfell Tower fire, BBC's Newshour programme invited West to read out an excerpt from a letter written by an anonymous firefighter giving a personal account of the fire scene and his inner thoughts on duty that night.

In 2020, West appeared on the album From The Ground Up: an ensemble led by Hugo Ticciati improvised over Henry Purcell chaconne bass lines while West read Shakespeare and rapper Baba Israel improvised. The album won the 2020 Gramophone Award for Best Concept Album.

== Awards and nominations ==
As actor

- 1993 – Nominated BAFTA Award for Best Supporting Actor for Howards End
- 1999 – Nominated Genie Award for Best Actor for Rupert's Land
- 2001 – Won Critics' Circle Theatre Awards for Best Shakespearean Performance for Hamlet
- 2001 – Won Whatsonstage Theatregoers' Choice Award Best Actor for Hamlet
- 2008 – Nominated Whatsonstage Theatregoers' Choice Award for Best Ensemble Performance for Betrayal
- 2009 – Nominated TMA Award for Best Performance in a Play for ENRON
- 2009 – Nominated Evening Standard Award Best Actor for ENRON
- 2010 – Nominated Whatsonstage Theatregoers' Choice Award for Best Actor for ENRON
- 2010 – Nominated Olivier Award Best Actor for ENRON

As reader

- 1999 – Won Talkie award for Charlotte Gray by Sebastian Faulks
- 2000 – Won Audie award for Realms of Gold: Letters and Poems of John Keats
- 2001 – Won Spoken Word award (Silver) for The Seeing Stone by Kevin Crossley-Holland
- 2001 – Won Spoken Word award (Gold) for Birdsong by Sebastian Faulks

Samuel West has received nine AudioFile Earphones Awards for his narration: The Day of the Triffids by John Wyndham (1996), Peter Pan by J.M.Barrie (1997), Charlotte Gray by Sebastian Faulks (1999), The Way I Found Her by Rose Tremain (2000), The Swimming Pool Library by Alan Hollinghurst (2007), Faust by Goethe (2011), A Shropshire Lad by A. E. Housman (2011), A Possible Life by Sebastian Faulks (2012) and Philip Pullman's Grimm Tales for Young and Old (2013)

As director

- 2004 – Nominated Olivier Award for Best Opera Revival for Cosi Fan Tutte
- 2008 – Nominated Olivier Award for Best Revival for Dealer's Choice
- 2009 – Nominated Theatregoers' Choice Award for Best Director for Waste and Dealer's Choice
