= Seventh Son =

Seventh Son may refer to:

== Film ==
- The Seventh Son (film), a 1926 German silent film
- Seventh Son (film), a 2014 American fantasy film

== Literature ==
- Seventh Son (novel), a 1987 novel by Orson Scott Card
- 7th Son: Descent, a 2009 novel by J. C. Hutchins
- The Seventh Son (novel), a 2023 novel by Sebastian Faulks

== Music ==
- "The Seventh Son", a 1955 song written by Willie Dixon, first recorded by Willie Mabon
- Seventh Son, a 1970 album by Georgie Fame

== See also ==
- Seventh son of a seventh son, a concept in folklore
- Seventh Son of a Seventh Son, an Iron Maiden album
- The Seventh Song, a 2000 album by Steve Vai
