= Devil May Care (Faulks novel) =

Novel by Sebastian Faulks

- First edition cover, published by Penguin Books
- Author: Sebastian Faulks
- Cover artist: Photography: Kevin Summers; Design: The Partners
- Language: English
- Series: James Bond
- Genre: Spy fiction
- Publisher: Penguin 007
- Publication date: 28 May 2008
- Publication place: United Kingdom
- Media type: Print (hardcover)
- Pages: 295 pp (first edition, hardback)
- ISBN: 978-0-7181-5376-2 (first edition, hardback)
- OCLC: 192027506

Devil May Care is a James Bond continuation novel written by Sebastian Faulks. It was published in the UK by Penguin Books on 28 May 2008, the 100th anniversary of the birth of Ian Fleming, the creator of Bond. The story centres on Bond's investigation into Dr. Julius Gorner, a megalomaniac chemist with a deep-seated hatred of England.

Faulks wrote the book in the style of Fleming, and the novel carried the credit "Sebastian Faulks writing as Ian Fleming"; he also took the same timeframe as Fleming, setting the novel in 1967, following the events in Fleming's last novel The Man with the Golden Gun. He ignored the influences of the other Bond continuation authors and the films, producing a characterisation of Bond in the style of Fleming's.

The novel was broadly well received by critics and went into the best-seller lists by the end of the first week of sales, selling 44,093 copies in four days to become the fastest-selling fiction book after the Harry Potter titles. Faulks stated that although he enjoyed writing the book, he would write no more Bond novels.

== Plot ==
The story is set in 1967. Bond is instructed by his superior, M, to investigate a man named Dr Julius Gorner, and his bodyguard, Chagrin. Bond is warned that his performance will be monitored and that a new 00 agent is waiting in the wings if his actions go awry.

Bond flies to Imperial Iran (Persia) to investigate. Gorner owns factories and produces legitimate pharmaceuticals; however, MI6 suspects he has other motives. During Bond's investigation he identifies Gorner due to a deformity of his hand, and establishes Gorner's complicity in a scheme to not only flood Europe with cheap heroin, manufactured on an industrial scale, but also to launch a two-pronged terrorist attack on the Soviet Union, whose retaliation will subsequently devastate the UK. The attack is to be made using a stolen British airliner, earlier hijacked over Iraqi airspace, and an ekranoplan. Bond is assisted in his investigation by Scarlett Papava (whose twin sister Poppy is under Gorner's emotional spell), Darius Alizadeh (the local head of station), JD Silver (an in-situ agent), and Felix Leiter.

Bond is eventually captured by Gorner in the heroin plant, who explains that Bond is to be used as bait during a drugs delivery across the Afghan desert, and should he survive an expected ambush, is to fly the captured airliner into the Russian heartland. Bond would be identified as British upon its destruction, increasing the evidence against the British Government. Bond survives the predicted Afghan attack and plots an escape attempt, which sees Scarlett get away due to Bond surrendering himself as a diversion. In the morning he is taken aboard the aeroplane. Before the airliner can bomb the Soviets, with the aid of the airliner's pilot and Scarlett (who had been hiding on board), Bond regains control of the aeroplane and crashes it into a mountainside after parachuting to safety.

Meanwhile, Felix Leiter and Darius inform agent Silver of the second method of attack. Silver shows himself to be a double agent by failing to call in an airstrike against the Ekranoplan and by attempting to kill Leiter and Darius. In the shoot-out Darius successfully calls in the airstrike at the cost of his own life and Leiter survives only thanks to the timely arrival of Hamid, his taxi driver. The Ekranoplan is destroyed by RAF Vulcan bombers before it reaches its target. Bond and Scarlett escape through Russia but are pursued by Chagrin, whom Bond finally kills on a train. Later Gorner meets him on a boat and tries to shoot him, but Bond pushes him overboard, where he is torn to pieces by a propeller. With the subsequent elimination of both Chagrin and Gorner, Bond considers his mission a success, and on condition that the agent M has waiting in the wings will not take his place Bond is sent to assess the new agent, designated 004. She turns out to be Scarlett Papava. Scarlett discloses that the story of her twin sister was a ploy to convince Bond to enable her to join the mission. Papava feared that if Bond knew she was a potential 00 agent, he would not have worked with her. With Bond returning to active duty, Scarlett moves off to her own operations as a full 00 agent.

== Characters and themes ==
The central character of the novel is James Bond, the fictional MI6 agent created by Ian Fleming. Faulks modelled his version of the character on Fleming's version, ignoring the other continuation authors and the films; when interviewed, Faulks said that "My Bond is Fleming's Bond—not Connery, or Moore or Craig, for all their charms", going on to say that "my Bond drinks and smokes as much as ever". Faulks saw Bond as a man in constant peril: "This Bond, this solitary hero with his soft shoes and single under-powered weapon, was a man in dreadful danger. You feared for him." On another occasion he returned to the theme, describing the character as "a very vulnerable man, with his nice suit and soft shoes and ludicrously underpowered gun. He finds himself in terrible situations, and he's all on his own—you just worry for his safety."

With the novel following the fictional timeframe of The Man with the Golden Gun, Bond is still in a state of decline following the death of his wife, and has been forced to take a sabbatical on medical grounds. His mind and body were feeling the effects of his previous missions and lifestyle and he was considering M's offer of a desk job; before he can make the decision, M sends him out on another mission.

For the main female character in the book, Faulks created Scarlett Papava, a fellow MI6 agent who is promoted to the 00 section at the end of the novel. Academic Tony Garland draws a similarity between Papava and the John Gardner character Fredericka von Grüsse, as they both create "a tension between mission and desire." Faulks himself considered that: "My female lead—the 'Bond girl'—has a little more depth than Fleming's women, but not at the expense of glamour", although Christopher Hitchens complained that "there is almost no sex until the very last pages."

The primary antagonist of the novel is Dr Julius Gorner, a chemist with main de singe, monkey's paw: a left hand resembling that of a monkey, covered with hair and without an opposed thumb. Writer Ian Thomson sees Gorner as being "a villain to rival the half-Chinese Dr Julius No", describing him as "a megalomaniac in the cruel lineage of Tamburlaine". When mocked as a student at Oxford because of his hand, he became obsessed with destroying England. Gorner was Lithuanian by birth, which was a nod by Faulks to Auric Goldfinger's Baltic background, whilst his cheating in a game of tennis against Bond was "a deliberate twin to golf with Auric Goldfinger; there is even a sinister Asian manservant—Chagrin, nodding across literary time to Oddjob—who helps his boss to cheat." Academic Marc DiPaolo also noted a similarity between Gorner's plans to take over the media and destroy British culture from within and the actions of Rupert Murdoch.

The main theme of the novel is drugs, which Faulks said came partly from the timeframe of the novel and partly from Fleming not using it as a major theme: "1967, the summer of love ... Drugs were first coming to public notice. The Stones were busted, and there was that famous leader in The Times. And, you know, what are we talking about now all the time? Drugs. It's still very resonant. And there's little about drug-dealing in Fleming. It's not something he did in any depth." Faulks also wanted to broaden the aspect of the story compared to Fleming: "The book is set during the Cold War and I wanted it to not just be a crime story but to also have a political background. I was also determined that although the book is set in 1967, I wanted the issues that it touches on to still be alive to us today".

== Background ==
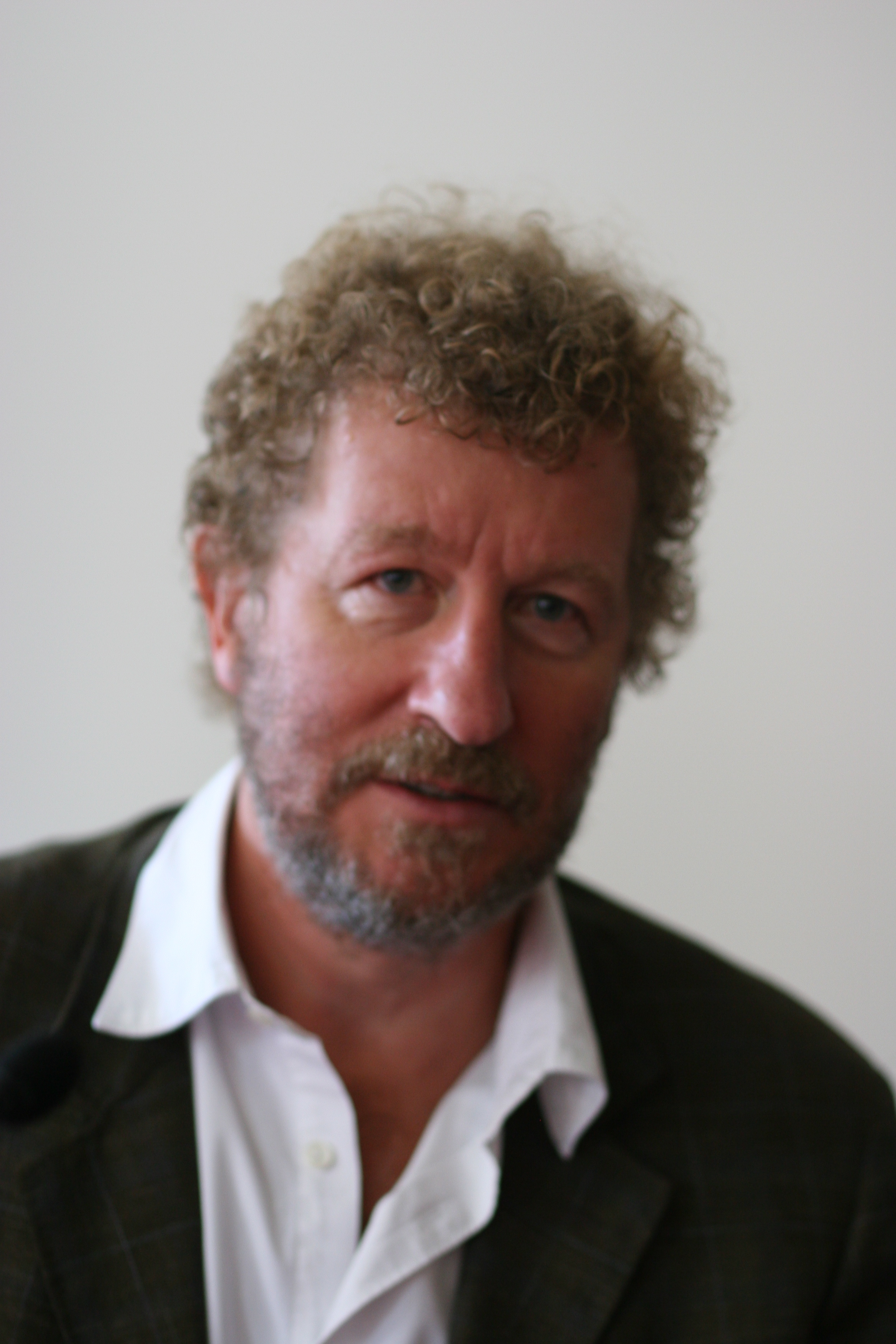
Sebastian Faulks, author of Devil May Care, in 2008.

During May 2006 Sebastian Faulks was approached by Ian Fleming Publications and asked to write a Bond book for Ian Fleming's centenary. Although he initially refused, he was persuaded after he re-read Fleming's novels and the company gave him an article by Fleming in 1962—How to Write a Thriller—which revealed that he wrote each Bond book in only six weeks. Faulks copied elements of Fleming's routine, joking that "In his house in Jamaica, Ian Fleming used to write 1000 words in the morning, then go snorkelling, have a cocktail, lunch on the terrace, more diving, another 1000 words in the late afternoon, then more martinis and glamorous women. In my house in London, I followed this routine exactly, apart from the cocktails, the lunch and the snorkelling."

The novel carried the unusual credit of "Sebastian Faulks writing as Ian Fleming" and Faulks described how—using Fleming's article—he had employed the same style as Fleming did in his novels: "it's standard journalistic: no semicolons, few adverbs, few adjectives, short sentences, a lot of verbs, a lot of concrete nouns. These are the tools, and that's literally the style." Faulks also commented that "some people find it perplexing but I think the way that the book has been presented ... is a clever way of showing that it is not my book, although, of course, it is my book." A large part of Devil May Care is set in Persia (now Iran); it was an area Fleming had not previously dealt with in his Bond novels, describing it as "full of thieves and crooks". Faulks said of his choice of location that Fleming "didn't set any of his books there, which is surprising in some ways because Lebanon in the 60s would have made a great setting for a Bond story. But his loss is my gain."

Faulks was known for his previous best-selling works Charlotte Gray, Birdsong and On Green Dolphin Street. He was the fifth author to produce an original Bond novel for Ian Fleming Publications (formerly Glidrose), after Fleming himself. Kingsley Amis (writing as "Robert Markham") produced Colonel Sun, John Gardner wrote fourteen original novels and two novelizations, and Raymond Benson produced six original novels and three novelizations. Additionally, Christopher Wood had produced two novelizations of the Eon films, while Charlie Higson and Samantha Weinberg (as "Kate Westbrook") had also published Bond-related novels.

Faulks stated that Devil May Care would be his only Bond book, saying: "One tribute, one centenary, one book", adding "My contract did offer me a second go, but definitely not ... 'Once funny, twice silly, three times a slap', as the nanny saying goes. But I think it would be a good gig for someone to do." He saw his novel as a continuation of the Fleming books, saying "I tried to put the films out of mind", adding that "I prepared in a rather pedantic way by reading all of the books in chronological order and when I got to the end I wrote mine."

== Release and reception ==
Devil May Care was published in the UK on Wednesday, 28 May 2008, to mark the centenary of Ian Fleming's birth. The hardcover published by Penguin Books was 295 pages long and cost £18.99. It was released through Doubleday in the United States. 400,000 hardcover copies were printed for the launch for the UK and US markets. The jacket artwork featured the model Tuuli Shipster, who said: "I was thrilled that Penguin chose me to be their Bond girl. It's fantastic to be involved with something so iconic." The cover picture was taken by British photographer and commercials director, Kevin Summers. The jacket was created by the design agency The Partners.

In the UK, Devil May Care went to the top of the best-seller lists by the end of the first week's sales, having sold 44,093 copies in four days; this made it the fastest-selling fiction book after the Harry Potter titles. Waterstones reported selling 19,000 in the first four days of sales. The book was released in paperback version in the UK on 28 May 2009.

On 27 May 2008, the day before Devil May Care was launched, the press party to publicise the launch of the book included Tuuli Shipster bringing copies up the Thames on a speedboat for a party on HMS Exeter, while two Lynx helicopters circled the ship. The ship, together with its 205-strong crew, had been loaned by the Royal Navy for the occasion.

=== Reviews ===
Writing in The Times, Peter Millar thought that "This is vintage Bond, in a very real sense"; he went on to observe that the central figure was "Bond as Fleming abandoned him, shortly before his own death". Millar summarised his critique by saying that the novel was a "ripping yarn, but don't take it seriously". Sam Leith, reviewing the novel for The Daily Telegraph thought that Faulks managed to avoid pastiche in his writing of the book, but had some fun, with "crass stuff ... being played, of course, for laughs". Leith noted that aside from the more camp elements to the book—of which he approved—"when [Faulks] throttles down and lets the Bond schtick do its own work he soon hits a comfortable cruising speed. Plot Bristol fashion: violent pre-credit sequence; flirtatious exchange with Moneypenny; apprehension mid-snoop; transportation to secret base; villain confessing plans; thwarting of plans; coitus."

Reviewing the novel for The Guardian, Mark Lawson wrote that Faulks had made a good job of imitating Fleming, as the plot "persistently picks up whispers from the books Fleming left behind", and using a style and turn of phrase that "read as if they were directly borrowed from Fleming." The main difference Lawson identified between Fleming and Faulks was that Faulks "misses the chilling indifference of tone which Bond's creator brought to both kissing and killing". Overall, Lawson considered that Devil May Care "is a smart and enjoyable act of literary resurrection. Among the now 33 post-Fleming Bonds, this must surely compete only with Kingsley Amis's for the title of the best." Nicola Barr, writing for The Guardian's Saturday edition, was broadly supportive of Faulks, commenting that "No one expects or wants subtlety from Bond, and Faulks delivers a thriller that manages to feel reassuringly familiar rather than predictable."

Euan Ferguson, writing in The Guardian's sister paper, The Observer, stated that "It's good. Which is to say it's better than it could have been. It is not, however, that good." He noted that Faulks "evokes scenes with deft skill: recreates a time and a world with great brio, and manages it with the block script of Fleming's journalistic nature rather than his own more cursive style." Ferguson remained unsatisfied by the book, although he absolves the author of the blame, saying "the problem isn't Faulks, it's Bond. With Fleming's untimely death, the link was broken". Ferguson is pessimistic about Bond's future and predicted that "Bond's tux now flaps in the wind and despite Faulks having made such a well-finessed fist of this, it is, I suspect, a last hurrah for 007, destined to die on the page, if not the screen".

The critic for the London Evening Standard observed that "for once, the claim on the cover, Sebastian Faulks writing as Ian Fleming is more than just publishers effrontery, it's a genuine strategy". The critic went on to note that Faulks had "not attempted to modernise Bond one whit" and that he had "delivered in convincing fashion too, in plain prose." Writing in the Financial Times, Christopher Hitchens complained that although Faulks claimed to be writing "as Fleming", it fell short of doing so: "This pot-boiler takes several times as long as most Bond classics. There is almost no sex until the very last pages. There is almost no torture – an absolute staple of a Bond narrative – until the very last pages." Hitchens admitted that Faulks had referred to elements of Fleming's novels, so that "those who have a canonical attitude to Fleming will be able to collect their share of in-jokes and cross-references"; similarly, "wispy fragments of Vesper Lynd and Honey Ryder drift in and out of shot and memory in much the same way". Hitchens concluded his review of the novel by considering that Bond had been "cheapened" in the novel.

Janet Maslin, reviewing Devil May Care for the International Herald Tribune, remarked that Faulks did not "tinker with the series' surefire recipe for success", which resulted in "a serviceable madeleine for Bond nostalgists and a decent replica of past Bond escapades". Patrick Anderson, writing in The Washington Post, admitted that he "was never a great fan of the Bond books" and considered that "Devil May Care has its amusing and entertaining moments, but there were other moments when I thought it would never end".

The New York Times critic, Charles McGrath, felt that Faulks "improbably injects new life into the formula", which meant that Devil May Care was "a stronger novel than any that Fleming wrote". Fritz Lanham, writing for the Houston Chronicle declared that "so satisfying was Sebastian Faulks' new James Bond novel that I felt obliged to celebrate by making myself a vodka martini, very dry, shaken, not stirred." Lanham considered that Faulks had "produced a book true to the spirit of the originals", whilst also producing a novel that "works as a thriller".

== See also ==
- List of James Bond novels and stories
- Outline of James Bond

== Bibliography ==
- DiPaolo, Marc (2011). War, Politics and Superheroes: Ethics and Propaganda in Comics and Film. Jefferson, North Carolina: McFarland & Company. ISBN 978-0-7864-4718-3.
- Macintyre, Ben (2008). For Your Eyes Only. London: Bloomsbury Publishing. ISBN 978-0-7475-9527-4.
