= Janvilliers =

- Commune
- Location of Janvilliers
- Location within France Location within Grand Est
- Coordinates: 48°53′42″N 3°38′57″E
- Country: France
- Region: Grand Est
- Department: Marne
- Arrondissement: Épernay
- Canton: Sézanne-Brie et Champagne
- Intercommunality: CC Brie Champenoise

Government
  - Mayor (2020–2026): Olivier Himmesoete
- Area^{1}: 8.74 km^{2} (3.37 sq mi)
- Elevation: 219 m (719 ft)
- Population (2023): 152
  - Density: 17.4/km^{2} (45.0/sq mi)
- Time zone: UTC+01:00 (CET)
  - Summer (DST): UTC+02:00 (CEST)
- INSEE/Postal code: 51304 /51210
- ^{1} French Land Register data, which excludes lakes, ponds, glaciers > 1 km^{2} (0.386 sq mi or 247 acres) and river estuaries.

Janvilliers (French pronunciation: [ʒɑ̃vilje]) is a commune in the Marne department in north-eastern France.

Janvilliers is not the setting for Sebastian Faulks' 1989 novel The Girl at the Lion d'Or. Although Faulks' novel is largely set in a town called Janvilliers, descriptions of the town in the book indicate that it is situated on the Atlantic Coast in Brittany.

== See also ==
- Communes of the Marne department
