= Engleby =

2007 novel by Sebastian Faulks

- First edition
- Author: Sebastian Faulks
- Language: English
- Genre: Fiction
- Publisher: Hutchinson
- Publication date: 2007
- Publication place: United Kingdom
- Media type: Print
- ISBN: 9780099458272
- Preceded by: Human Traces
- Followed by: Devil May Care

Engleby is a 2007 novel by the author Sebastian Faulks. It tells the tale of a working-class boy who wins a place at an esteemed university and becomes a suspect in a murder investigation after the disappearance of a girl from a nearby college.

== Plot ==
Mike Engleby attends an 'ancient university', studying English at first, but switching over to natural sciences after he begins to doubt the legitimacy of the subject. He is infatuated with a girl named Jennifer Arkland, whose name he only discovered on posters advertising her running for a society committee. He begins to attend the society in order to meet her and attends her history lectures, in a different faculty, despite not studying history.

He does not perform as well as expected on his second year exams but takes part in the production of a student film in Ireland involving Jennifer. While there he reads Jennifer's letters and begins to reflect about his past.

He remembers his working-class upbringing in Reading, his dad's death and his subsequent scholarship to Chatfield – a public school for the children of navy servicemen.

At Chatfield he was bullied by the prefects and by other students, gaining the name "Toilet Engleby" by asking for permission to go to the toilet rather than "lavatory" during a lesson. One prefect, Baynes, steals a cake sent to him by his mother and later forces Engleby to take a bath in cold water. Engleby begins to steal, at first to pay for letters to his sister, but he soon escalates to frequent theft and begins to buy cigarettes to sell on to other pupils.

Engleby assaults Baynes who suffers from head injuries and broken leg in the attack which is staged to look like an accident. Engleby meets a boy named Stevens to whom he takes an immediate dislike. Stevens is outgoing, enthusiastic, plays rugby and is liked by his year. Engleby's final memory of Chatfield is of forcing Stevens to take a cold bath, just as Baynes had done to him previously.

Jennifer Arkland disappears half-way through her final year after a party attended by Engleby, who at some point stole Jennifer's diary, which he begins to read and memorise. Engleby is questioned by the police about the disappearance of Jennifer and claims that Jennifer is his girlfriend. Other students have also been interviewed, some making statements that Engleby is homosexual, which doesn't tally up for the investigating officers. His alibi fails to stand up but no concrete evidence against him is found and the investigation is suspended.

Engleby fails to attain a first in his final exams. He moves to London and makes a living by drug dealing, eventually becoming a journalist. He assumes the name Michele Watt as the left-wing paper he writes for is seeking to have more female writers. After a while he changes his assumed name to Michael Watson, as he claims he no longer needs to pretend to be a woman and it was convenient for him to keep a similar name.

He reveals that during his time at university he began to have panic attacks and that he has been taking 'blue pills' on the advice of a doctor at a mental health hospital he was taken to, after collapsing during a panic attack.

He meets and starts a relationship with a woman working at the same paper, Margaret, whom he then moves in with.

Years later, Jennifer's body is unearthed and the police track down Mike for questioning. It is revealed that a shirt the officers took from his college rooms during the investigation was checked using newly developed DNA techniques and was shown to have Jennifer's blood on it.

Mike pleads guilty to the murder of Jennifer Arkland. He explains that he murdered Jennifer as she came home from a party, offering her a ride and refusing to let her get out. He drove to a remote location and, when she offered to do anything to be let go, he killed her. He adds that he also may have murdered a German woman called Gudrun Abendroth in London and that he had attacked Baynes while at Chatfield, causing injuries, then thought to be accidental, which contributed to Baynes' premature death some time later.

He pleads limited responsibility and after analysis by psychiatrist Dr. Exley he is diagnosed with a personality disorder and is sent to a mental institution. He is never released but eventually attains a sense of peace, teaching many of the other patients various basic skills.

== Themes ==
=== Unreliable narration ===
The narration is from the perspective of Engleby himself, and he often obscures or misrepresents the events around him. This is most noticeable in the disappearance of Jennifer, to which he gives no indication of his involvement until very near the end of the novel.

=== Mental illness ===
Engleby has numerous panic attacks throughout the course of the novel and takes medication to prevent symptoms of anxiety. He occasionally alludes to feeling isolated, but rejects the idea that he has depression. Late in the novel, a psychological professional diagnoses him with schizoid personality disorder and some narcissistic tendencies, while maintaining that he does not have any biological mental illness like schizophrenia.

=== Treatment of women ===
Engleby idolizes Jennifer throughout the novel. He stalks her by following her into lectures and attending her societies. He is frustrated when she pleads to leave the car when he presumes to give her a lift home and deliberately takes a wrong turn to prolong their time together. He later kills her, apparently for accidentally threatening his sexual potency after he drives her off into a secluded area. He appears to consider women fundamentally different from men, and dismisses demands for sexual equality as 'flak from grumpy feminists', calling ideas of female equality 'lies'.

== Reception ==
=== Critical reception ===
Reviews of the novel were mixed, with many critics citing the almost unlikable narrator as a negative factor.

Phil Hogan of The Observer said, "The character of Engleby's oddness, though, is harder to fathom. His prose has that flat, stilted quality familiar to the modern reader as a sign of moral vacuity, but does he have to be so uninteresting with it?" He went on to say, "The eventual arrival of men in white coats – a welcome introduction of sane voices – heralds the most successful section of the book. Relieved of the burden of faux suspense, ideas kept at the fringe by passing ephemera are foregrounded, themes blossom. This, you sense, is what Faulks has been waiting for – the chance to engage more directly with his subject. His prose, freed from the shackles of a troubled mind, starts to shine too. The trouble is it shines too late."

Jane Shilling of The Daily Telegraph said, "Like Human Traces, Engleby is distinguished by a remarkable intellectual energy: a narrative verve, technical mastery of the possibilities of the novel form and vivid sense of the tragic contingency of human life."

Terrence Rafferty of The New York Times said, "At one point, near the end, when both the character and his creator seem to be getting slightly desperate, Engleby throws out the possibility that the 'idea of self' may be no more than a 'necessary fiction.' Maybe it is. 'Engleby' isn't."
