= The Seventh Son (novel) =

2023 novel by Sebastian Faulks

- First edition
- Author: Sebastian Faulks
- Language: English
- Published: 2023 (Hutchinson Heinemann)
- Publication place: United Kingdom
- Media type: Print (hardback)
- Pages: 368 pp
- ISBN: 1-52-915320-4
- Dewey Decimal: 823.92
- Preceded by: Snow Country
- Followed by: Farewell to Eden

The Seventh Son is a 2023 novel by author Sebastian Faulks, telling a story in the near future of a child born through a clandestine IVF procedure to a surrogate mother.

It is Faulks's sixteenth novel.

== Plot ==
The story takes place in the mid-21st century and moves mainly between the United States of America and Great Britain. The main protagonists are : Talissa Adam, an American seeking a source of funding to continue a career in academic Anthropology. Mary and Alaric Pedersen is a British couple hoping to have a child through use of a paid surrogate mother, who turns out to be Talissa. Lukas Parn is an extremely wealthy businessman, owner of an eminent IVF clinic in London, who also funds clandestine experimentation involving manipulation of archaic genetic material. Seth Pedersen is the son born to Talissa through IVF who is brought up by Mary and Alaric.

Unbeknown to Talissa, Mary and Alaric, Lukas Parn arranges for the embryo implanted to have been secretly modified to include Neanderthal DNA. Seth's childhood, education and adolescence are in many ways normal, however he does exhibit some particular traits, both physical and mental. Most notable are his poor awareness of danger, lack of forward planning, limited sociability though with a strong appeal to women and an almost telepathic connection with animals.

When Seth is 12 years old, Talissa travels to London to meet Mary, Alaric and their son for the first time since his birth. She immediately feels an emotional attraction to Seth. At the same time she is intrigued by his physical variance from his parents and other obvious peculiarities. Four years after returning to the US, she happens upon a locket of Seth's hair previously given to her by Mary. On a whim she commissions a laboratory genetic analysis of a strand to which some root tissue is still attached, to be undertaken in secret by one of her professional contacts. When this reveals the fundamental anomaly, Talissa queries it with a particular member of staff at the London IVF clinic who she had found sympathetic at the time of her surrogacy. She subsequently is invited to meet Lukas Parn at one of his luxurious residences. He admits the subterfuge and clumsily tries to seduce her both financially and amorously. Talissa rejects his advances and demands solely that Seth is permitted to live a normal life without his true genetic heritage being revealed to him or anyone else.

Seth graduates from a prestigious university through natural intelligence and unflappable nonchalance rather than academic effort or inclination. He also enjoys success on the soccer field, in aromantic sexual intimacy and in betting on horse racing, all through seemingly innate abilities which others view as unfathomable.

A year later rumours begin to circulate in the news of a mysterious individual at large who had been surrogated with a non-human genetic code. Talissa fears that the growing populist frenzy will lead to the full truth being revealed with harsh consequences for the unsuspecting Pedersen family. She takes action to force Lukas Parn into offering compensation and protection for those impacted by his experiment. With great difficulty, she herself reveals the fantastical situation to Mary, Aleric and Seth. Parn however is more interested in using a public revelation of his experiment to generate personal kudos and academic notoriety. His PR Team manage to persuade Seth to take part in an interview with a celebrity TV star. Despite elaborate procedures to mask his true identity, a mistake by Seth leads to his actual image going into circulation. Mary, Alaric, Talissa and her friends attempt to protect Seth from identification in public and a growing extremist hostility by arranging for him to move between increasingly remote locations.

Meanwhile, Parn and his co-conspirators are taken to court and found guilty of fraud and sentenced to multi-billion pound fines and prison sentences.

Talissa and Seth plan an escape to an uninhabited Scottish island. While they travel Talissa's attraction towards Seth becomes almost unbearably strong. He seems to be aware of this, though his own emotions are characteristically muted. Several times during their journey, members of the public seem to recognise Seth. When they eventually arrive at their destination it is still with hope that it will not have been discovered.

After an idyllic few days, the pair actually do engage in sexual intercourse, though Talissa explicitly ensures that the likelihood of conception is minimised. However it then becomes clear that their hideaway has been uncovered and that news reporters are on the point of catching up with Seth. Unwilling to accept a future life dominated by unwanted celebrity and hateful bigotry, he calmly takes his own life by drowning.

== Title ==
There are a number of different explanations for the choice of title for this novel. The adoptive father Alaric explains to surrogate mother Talissa that in The Bible, Seth is the seventh son of Adam, given to Eve by God as a replacement for Abel, who had been murdered by Cain. However Alaric's wife, Mary, says they chose the name simply because they liked it.

Separately, the number seven is the anonymous identifier for Seth that is used by Lukas Parn's IVF clinic.

The number seven also has significance in folklore whereby, for example, the "seventh son of a seventh son is bestowed with supernatural gifts".

== Themes ==
=== Mental illness ===
Sebastian Faulks has had personal experience of mental illness both in his own life and in that of his immediate family. It is a subject which has featured in a number of his earlier works, such as Engleby, Human Traces and Snow Country. The latter two form part of what has come to be known as his "Austrian Trilogy", with the final part yet to be published. The Seventh Son also reflects Faulks's continuing interest in psychiatry.

Lukas Parn and his co-conspirators view the birth and development of Seth as a valuable experiment in regard to the genesis of human consciousness. The periodic tests that he is obliged to undergo seek to identify any relevant psychological variations induced by the Neanderthal elements in his DNA. They contend that schizophrenia and other forms of severe mental illness may be by-products of the development of perception and awareness unique to Homo sapiens. Analysis of Seth's mental attributes may thus provide some insight to a future eradication of these afflictions.

=== Boundaries of ethics ===
Another main element of the story according to the author himself is to consider the consequences when scientists "stretch the boundaries of ethics as never before". The question asked is "just because you can do something, does it mean you should ?"

=== Neurodiversity ===
A maturing Seth develops a number of less common physical attributes such as a short stocky stature, a low brow hairline, early puberty and non-standard sexual organs. He is also revealed to exhibit a number of neurodiverse characteristics. Whilst being intelligent enough to graduate at a top university he is very introverted, clearly has limited imagination and a particular incognisance of many everyday matters. At the same time his affinity with animals is viewed as remarkable by others and he has a positional awareness in football which is quite unusual. Women find him naturally attractive though he does nothing to encourage them and makes no attempt to use this to his own advantage.

=== Attitudes to diversity ===
Given the extent of Seth's differences from the norm, the novel explores the vast range of attitudes that he encounters. His parents continue to show him unconditional love throughout his increasingly difficult life journey. Females, even his surrogate mother, may seem in some way sexually mesmerised by him. At university the academic authorities are perplexed by Seth's totally unorthodox lackadaisical approach to his studies but see his true potential and are willing to embrace special procedures to ensure he does not become excluded from the mainstream.

In contrast however Seth meets negative attitudes from many quarters. Lukas Parn and his associates view him as an experimental guinea pig whose sole purpose is to deliver them their own professional goals. At school he is badly bullied as an outsider and even though his footballing prowess is admired, his lack of team engagement means he is not popular with the other players. Most aggressive is the reaction of the extremist group "Vector" who seek to whip up a frenzy of public hatred based upon an underlying widespread propensity to xenophobia. News outlets such as the Christian Fundamentalist "Galatia" also exploit this to depict Seth as a freak in order to serve their own socio-political agenda while treating his privacy and future well-being as totally expendable.

== Critical reception ==
Reviews of the novel are very varied. The author's high quality prose is delivered as anticipated. Andrew Motion says of it that "Sebastian Faulks writes old-fashioned novels that frame serious themes in sturdy structures". Literary Review admires the "ambitious and fascinating plot". Ben East in The Guardian is more reserved saying Faulks "just about pulls off this juggle of science, anthropology and a melancholy but effortlessly readable story about human consciousness".

Other critics are more uncertain about the actual narrative. The Scotsman is not entirely convinced: "This is a beautifully written novel. On the one hand you have love, kindness, responsibility; on the other monstrous arrogance and indifference to consequences … the last 40 or so pages are somewhat disappointing". Ann Skea in The Newtown Review of Books feels that "there are several seeming loose ends in this book". For example, a plot strand which feels somewhat gratuitous sees Talissa splitting from her boyfriend who then progressively develops severe schizophrenia. She also finds the "relationship between (Seth) and Talissa towards the end of the book too strange to be believable". In this regard it is worth noting that the author himself admitted that he did find it difficult to write the sex scene between the surrogate mother and her son at the novel's conclusion.

The website of the Progress Educational Trust, a charity which specifically concerns itself with genetics and assisted conception, also reviews the book. The criticism levelled here is not with the scientific concepts involved but that "the novel is weakest … in character development". Lukas Parn is an "off-the-peg villain". Seth is interviewed by "a leering TV host (who) plumbs the depths of sensationalist questioning". The reviewer complains that "these people are caricatures and as such add an unwelcome sense of jauntiness". A further weakness arises from the "long passages of scientific exposition". Marcel Theroux writing in The Guardian goes further on this point and says it "is at times a work of nonfiction masquerading as a novel".

The Telegraph meanwhile publishes a one-star review delivering a particularly harsh verdict writing: "The Birdsong author's 16th novel, The Seventh Son, is a strained, juddering mess that never settles on what it wants to be".
