= The Way to the Sea =

- Directed by: J. B. Holmes
- Written by: W. H. Auden (end commentary)
- Produced by: Paul Rotha
- Narrated by: Geoffrey Tandy; Norman Wooland
- Music by: Benjamin Britten
- Release date: 1936
- Country: United Kingdom
- Language: English

The Way to the Sea is a 1936 documentary film about the London to Portsmouth railway line (what is now known as the Portsmouth Direct Line) and its recent electrification. This is prefaced with an historical representation of Portsmouth and the London to Portsmouth road. It was produced by the Strand Film Company.

Its music was written by Benjamin Britten and its commentary by W. H. Auden, who also wrote the music and words respectively for the similarly themed Night Mail that year. The music from both films was broadcast at 3pm on Saturday 1 September 2007 at the Cadogan Hall as a Proms Matinee concert, narrated by Samuel West.
