= A Fool's Alphabet =

1992 novel by Sebastian Faulks

- First edition
- Author: Sebastian Faulks
- Language: English
- Published: 1992 (Hutchinson)
- Publication place: United Kingdom
- Media type: Print (Hardback)
- Pages: 288 pp
- ISBN: 0-09-177299-0
- OCLC: 26300769
- Dewey Decimal: 823/.914 20
- LC Class: PR6056.A89 F66 1992

A Fool's Alphabet is a 1992 novel by author Sebastian Faulks, telling the story of photographer Pietro Russell, born in 1950 to a British soldier and his Italian wife, in twenty-six alphabetical chapters.

It is Faulks's second novel and his most experimental. It is unusual for being composed of chapters named after places associated with the character but arranged alphabetically rather than chronologically. The title is taken from the joke alphabet that begins "A for 'orses, B for mutton".

The chapters and locations are as follows:

- Anzio, Italy, 1944
- Backley, Berkshire, England, 1950
- Colombo, Sri Lanka, 1980
- Dorking, Surrey, England, 1963
- Evanston, Illinois, USA, 1985
- Fulham, London, England, 1964
- Ghent, Belgium, 1981
- Houches, Les, France, 1967
- Ibiza, Balearic Islands, 1966
- Jerusalem, Israel, 1982
- Kowloon, Hong Kong, 1980
- Lyndonville, Vermont, USA, 1971
- Mons, Belgium, 1914
- New York, USA, 1983
- Oxford, England, 1976
- Paris, France, 1979
- Quetzaltenango, Guatemala, 1974
- Rome, Italy, 1978
- Sorrento, Italy, 1958
- Terminal 5, Heathrow Airport, England, 1988
- Uzès, France, 1987
- Vladimirci, Yugoslavia, 1986
- Watsonville, California, USA, 1974
- Xianyang, China
- Yarmouth, England, 1991
- Zanica, Italy, 1970

== Plot ==
The book's title and chapter structure derives from the detail of a specific section in the fourth chapter ("Dorking"). Pietro's father had developed a keen interest in etymology. In attempting to explain this to Pietro, he described the idea of a "Fool's Alphabet", which anyone could simply make up, but in this case was:

A for 'orses, B for mutton, C for yourself, D for dumb, E for brick, F for vescence, G for police, H for 'imself, I for Novello, J for oranges, K for restaurant, L for leather, M for sis, N for a penny, O for the wings of a dove, P for comfort, Q for a ticket, R for mo, S for Williams, T for two, U for me, V for la France, W for money, X for breakfast, Y for mistress, Z for breezes.

He then recalled a fellow soldier in North Africa wanting to spend a night in a place beginning with every letter of the alphabet before he died.

The book largely adheres to the idea of featuring episodes from Pietro's life when he found himself in such a selection of locations, however not exclusively so. "Mons" instead features his grandfather describing his First World War experiences to a teenage Pietro. Meanwhile "Anzio" begins the book by relating Pietro's father' story in Italy in the World War 2. "Xianyang" is "the representation of all the places he would not go". As such also, the latter chapter is the only one with no specific year date associated.

The plot also features an explicit reference to Faulks's own family history. His own father, Peter Faulks, fought and was wounded at Anzio and saw Mount Vesuvius erupting from his hospital bed, as does Pietro's father.

The actual narrative of the novel is best summarised by reordering the chapters chronologically:

- Mons. When in his teens, Pietro visits his grandfather and is surprised by his phlegmatically matter of fact memories of life on the Western Front in World War 1.
- Anzio. While recuperating from being wounded in action in World War Two Italy, Pietro's father first meets his future wife.
- Barkley. Pietro is born and forms a strong bond with his mother.
- Sorrento. As a young boy, Pietro enjoys a perfect holiday alone with his mother in her native Italy.
- Dorking. Pietro recalls the illness and death of his mother and the unhappy years at boarding school that followed.
- Fulham. Pietro moves on to an international school in London where he meets Harry and Laura, two central figures in his future life.
- Ibiza. His father takes Pietro on a surprise holiday which he enjoys despite their rather distant and awkward relationship.
- Houches, Les. Temporarily working in an alpine winter sports resort, Pietro recalls his earlier school skiing trip which made him aware of the possibility of a relationship with Laura.
- Zanica. Whilst budget travelling in Italy, Pietro by chance stays at the hostelry where he suspects he was conceived.
- Lydonville. Laura has invited Pietro to stay at her parents' home and they become lovers.
- Watsonville. After a 3 year relationship, an attempt to rekindle their romance through a trip to California fails and Laura leaves Pietro.
- Quezaltenango. Pietro is heartbroken by his split from Laura, driving erratically south into Central America, he finally has a breakdown in Guatemala.
- Oxford. Therapy sessions explore the reasons for Pietro's prolonged depression.
- Rome. Pietro's career in photography is advancing with a commission to photograph the room in which the poet John Keats died.
- Paris. The naming of Métro stations fascinates Pietro during a trip to take photographs relating to the Ariane space rocket programme.
- Colombo. Another photographic assignment, this time for the profile of a politician in Sri Lanka.
- Kowloon. His views on the work and life culture in Hong Kong are interspersed with reflections on how Pietro happened to become a professional photographer.
- Ghent. Hannah recounts the unlikely beginning of her relationship with future husband Pietro.
- Jerusalem. Harry and Pietro share an enlightening though often perplexing visit and tour of the Holy Land.
- New York. Pietro struggles as best man to navigate Harry's Jewish wedding.
- Evanston. A chance meeting with businessman Coleman leads to a lucrative job for Pietro in city-guide publishing.
- Vladimirci. Pietro quits his job with Coleman after the latter makes an improper and compromising proposal with respect to Harry's wife.
- Uzès. Harry and Pietro's families holiday together in France where a near tragedy and the truth behind the estrangement from Colman threaten to challenge their relationships.
- Terminal 5. Pietro is flying home to his family from a sojourn in Los Angeles the exact nature of which is not made clear.
- Yarmouth. Once again Pietro is on his way back to Hannah. His thoughts whilst detouring through locations related to the novel David Copperfield reveal some recent seemingly inconsequential infidelities.
- Xianyang. On reaching midlife (his fortieth birthday) Pietro reflects on the etymological and geographical limitations of place names whilst Hannah makes it clear that her love for him itself is not without boundaries.

== Themes ==
In his official website, the author explains some of the concepts involved in the novel:

"The structure of the novel is ….. not one of linear time, but the apparently random one of alphabetic order". Furthermore with the main character as a photographer "there is a snapshot quality to some of the chapters and place descriptions".

Chapters which concern events earlier chronologically are thus encountered later alphabetically. This writing structure seeks to provide impact as the reader is already at least partially aware of the later outcome. One critic notes that "There is nothing intrinsically dramatic about such a life, but what keeps you reading is the undercurrent of connection, coincidence and reflection beneath the bare facts".

Literary Review feels that "…this is a novel about transience, and of travel as a metaphor for restless humanity". However chronologically the final chapters suggest that with his wife and children, Pietro "at last achieves an emotional anchorage".

== Critical reception ==
The non-linear structure of the book may make this a more difficult read than Faulks' other novels. Mick Imlah reviewing in The Independent notes that its "whimsical structure is less a challenge than a declaration of hostility to story-telling."

However the general reception was positive. Writing in Literary Review, Janet Barron says that "It is sophisticated and witty, yet beneath the irony and humour it sparkles with warm insight". Publishers Weekly calls it "a wonderfully insightful book that reverberates with epiphanies large and small." A second review in The Independent reflects on "a subtle book, full of glancing allusions and sly humour."
