= The Girl at the Lion d'Or =

1989 novel by Sebastian Faulks

- 1st edition cover
- Author: Sebastian Faulks
- Cover artist: Paul Trouillebert, "Cattle Watering by a Lake with a Chateau Beyond"
- Language: English
- Series: The France Trilogy
- Genre: Historical novel
- Publisher: Hutchinson
- Publication date: August 1989
- Publication place: United Kingdom
- Media type: Print (hardback & paperback)
- Pages: 253 pp (first edition, hardback)
- ISBN: 0-09-173451-7 (first edition, hardback)
- OCLC: 59049051
- Followed by: Birdsong

The Girl at the Lion d'Or by Sebastian Faulks, the author's second novel, was set in the small French fictional town of Janvilliers, Brittany, in 1936. Together with Birdsong and Charlotte Gray, it makes up Faulks' France Trilogy. The character Charles Hartmann is common to all three books.

== Plot introduction ==
An unsigned prologue introduces the reader to 1930s France and sets up the fiction that the novel tells the true story behind an actual newspaper report of the time. This is imagined as being a passionate adulterous love affair between the book's two central characters with the nation's unstable political scene as its backdrop. The politics are rendered to us through the characters' everyday conversation. They rely on newspapers for information, which means that the history lesson aspect of the book arises organically in the narrative.

Written in the third person using a conventional omniscient narrator, the novel airs the internal motivations and viewpoints of various characters. The narrative tone is at times ironic; the author uses unfussy language to tell the story with economy. The vast majority of the scenes in the novel are set indoors, which gives it a domestic and claustrophobic feel. There are no descriptions of physical violence, but there is trauma and angst. The character of Mattlin is a truly vicious villain, while the mood is down-beat; in fact, it is mock Gothic in the Poe-inspired sub-plot involving the renovation of the Manor House.

The book is shot through with mordant wit, but there are also lighter moments of tenderness and near-slapstick. On its publication, The Girl at the Lion d'Or was lauded in reviews for Faulks' ability to evoke a sense of time and place and for his adroitness in creating engaging characters.

== Plot summary ==
Anne Louvert arrives in Janvilliers from Paris on a winter night to work at the Lion d'Or inn. She encounters the staff—Madame Concierge, the Cook, the Porter, and the Patron—as well as patrons including Mattlin and Hartmann.

A generation older than she, the cultured, rich and married Charles Hartmann begins an affair with Anne. She reveals her secrets, her fears and her hopes to him trusting in their mutual love. His wife, Christine, knows him better, and in the end, its no real contest for her to keep her husband and see off her latest rival. Although Faulks writes the love story with commitment, the nature of the novel determines that it can only end badly for Anne. An historical novel in which history is treated seriously, The Girl at the Lion d'Or is tragic drama and its real subject is France herself. A happy fairy-tale ending would be incongruous: it did not happen for the French Third Republic; therefore, it could not happen for Anne.

Anne's childhood has been blighted by the First World War. Her father was shot on a charge of mutiny while serving in the trenches at Verdun, and her mother, harassed and victimised because of his fate, driven to suicide. Anne endured a wandering, hand-to-mouth existence with her uncle Louvert, whose name she adopts.

Louvert, vainglorious and empty dispenser of fine sounding phrases- "Courage is the only thing that counts"-, joined a right wing revolutionary organisation with the aim of "making France great again" but deserted both Anne and France for a new life in America. Anne later invests her emotions in Hartmann and although devastated by his rejection, she does not allow it to destroy her. She intuitively turns away from suicide and the last line of the novel leads us to believe that she will, though there will be dark days ahead, overcome her situation. The battle of Verdun and the French army mutinies a year later were momentous events for the French nation. That the battle and a charge of mutiny played such a major part in Anne's personal history suggests a metaphorical link between her and France. The fact that the prologue to the narrative dedicates the story to Anne, "an unknown girl" rather than the "important public" figures of the time also indicates that the character represents something larger than an individual. The use of the adjective "unknown", in the context of this novel, is loaded with meaning, as it evokes the Unknown Soldier.

By making Anne a homeless, friendless, orphaned young woman, Faulks is pushing the limits of melodrama in his wish to create a character who is the opposite of those in the male-dominated world of political power. She is the victim of political decisions and human spite but does not embrace victimhood. Instead she embodies most of the virtues and a certain defiance. More importantly she is vital: she makes decisions and acts on them. The polemic thrust of the book, backed-up by references to newspaper stories of political crises and scandal at home and mounting threat of war from abroad, is that the period's political leaders were, at best, inert.

The setting of the story is also much removed from the centre of power and influence in the political sense if not geographically. In fact the author is shy of saying where in France the town of Janvilliers is. The descriptions of the seasons in the book and that Hartmann walks on a beach near his house from which "the sea has disappeared" puts it somewhere on the north coast. Imprecise as this is, it rules out the real Janvilliers being the location though its name may have been used because of that town's proximity to Verdun. Geographical imprecision serves the function of making the fictional Janvilliers a French "everytown" where the attitudes and experiences of its inhabitants typify those of towns throughout France of the period. Choosing 'Lion d'Or', a common and therefore typical name for French inns, as the name of the town hotel is meant to strengthen the idea of this representational aspect of Janvilliers. A war monument in the town centre commemorating the dead of the First World War could be found in any town in the country. Similarly, M. Bouin, a woman bereaved of her menfolk by the war and finding solace in religion, would be a familiar character in 1930's France. M. le Patron typifies the defeatist mindset among many of the time while the odious Mattlin is the town's future fifth columnist and collaborator.

Hartmann is the ineffectual liberal. His failure to confront Mattlin, whose slanders are undermining Hartmann's reputation just as surely as the builder hired to renovate his house undermines its foundations, can be read as a metaphor of the centre-left government's failure to confront fascism either at home or abroad.

== Characters ==
- Anne Louvert The 'Girl' in the title of the novel. Indigent. Tragic past. Traumatised by loss, she equates abandonment with unbearable tragedy. Descends into a psychological hell of her own making....by her blinding love for the wrong man. according to Maggie Galehouse writing in the New York Times, 16 January 2000 – a rather harsh tough love judgement. Honest, brave and humane Anne is allowed to hope at the end of the book.
- Charles Hartmann: Jewish veteran of First World War. A successful lawyer who lives at the Manor with wife Christine. Has affair with Anne. Hopes to Redeem the horrors of her childhood Puts her up in a flat. Ultimately he Gets entangled in the coils of his own conscience Politically aware, the national situation is reported to us through his conversations with other characters.
- Mattlin: A vile and disgusting Uriah Heep-like character with racism added.
- Christine Hartmann: Wronged wife.
- Mme Bouin: Manager of the Lion d'Or. Initially unsympathetic, her true nature is later revealed. Devoted to 'M. the Patron'.
- M. the Patron: Owner of the Lion d'Or. Agoraphobic due to experiences in the war. Pessimistic and angry about future. Caring.
- Bruno: Chef at the Lion d. Involved in the novel's overtly comic scenes.
- Roland: Porter at Lion d. Bored, idiotic youth. Voyeur.
- Antoine: Friend of Hartmann's since the war. Now a senior civil servant whose minister is involved in a scandal. Asks Hartmann to give legal advice.
- Louvert: Anne's Guardian after her mother's suicide. Not an active character in the narrative he is reported to us by the narrator and through Anne's memories of him. Considered himself a philosopher. Tells Anne that all emotional suffering is caused by abandonment. He abandons Anne for America when she refused to be his mistress. A member of a Crypto-Nazi French league, he is depicted mockingly in the text.

== See also ==
- Paths of Glory by Humphrey Cobb
- The Remains of the Day by Kazuo Ishiguro
- Fall of the House of Usher by Edgar Allan Poe
- The Road to Verdun by Ian Ousby
