= A Week in December =

2009 novel by Sebastian Faulks

- First edition cover
- Author: Sebastian Faulks
- Language: English
- Genre: Fiction
- Set in: London
- Published: 2009
- Publisher: Hutchinson (UK); Doubleday (US)
- Publication place: United Kingdom
- Media type: Print; Digital (Audiobook)
- Pages: 392 pp
- ISBN: 978-0-0917-9445-3
- OCLC: 373478261
- Dewey Decimal: 823.914
- LC Class: PR6056.A89

A Week in December is a novel by British writer Sebastian Faulks, published in 2009. The story is set in London, England over a week in December 2007.

== Plot ==
This episodic novel follows the lives of some Londoners in the last full week before Christmas, 2007. Most of them are guests at a dinner on Day Seven, Saturday; the others are closely connected.

R. Tranter is a critic and book reviewer who disparages and scorns all present-day literature, but champions a little-known Victorian writer. He is jealous of his contemporaries’ success. He does not earn much, but out of the blue receives two new, well-paid appointments.

Gabriel Northwood is a young barrister, lacking self-confidence, and with little work, though the new year looks promising. One case involves London Transport, and a witness is a tube driver, Jenni Fortune, the daughter of an Irish woman and an absent Trinidadian. Both Gabriel and Jenni have been hurt recently by the end of love affairs, and find comfort in books, though she also loses herself in a virtual-reality game. Using the pretext of preparing for the case, they meet a few times, and fall in love.

Tadeusz ‘Spike’ Borowski is a Polish footballer, getting used to playing for a Premier League London club. His Ukrainian girlfriend, Olya, used to (he does not know) pose nude for sex photographs, which are on the internet.

John Veals is a very successful, very rich hedge-fund manager. (He can be seen as the principal character of the novel.) Born to a Jewish family, he has put all that behind him, together with all feelings for family and all interests, except financial dealing. He has started a rumour which will enable him to manipulate the share price of a bank; the repercussions will cause havoc in financial and commodity markets, but bring him enormous profit. Finbar is Veals’s sixteen-year-old son, who lives a semi-independent life in the family home. His father is usually absent; his mother does not know how to speak to him; he has unlimited access to money. He spends £700 on skunk, genetically modified marijuana which, we learn, is thirty times more powerful than the original plant. When Finbar smokes it, he suffers a severe psychotic attack; he cries for his mother, who finds him, to her great distress.

Farooq al-Rashid, an immigrant from Pakistan, has built up a successful business making chutney and other condiments; he has been awarded an OBE; the investiture will be on Saturday morning. His twenty-one-year-old son, Hassan, who has felt uncomfortable in the various social groups to which he has belonged, has found comfort with a group of committed Islamists – though he is uncomfortable about his friendship, perfectly chaste, with Shahla, a secular Muslim, the daughter of an Iranian businessman. Gradually, Hassan has been radicalized. With three other young men, he is going to carry suicide bombs into a hospital (where Gabriel’s brother and Finbar are patients). On Saturday morning, he attends the investiture at Buckingham Palace; in the evening, he walks with his rucksack to the meeting-place at the hospital, south of the river. Almost at the last moment, he has an emotional crisis and desists, throwing his rucksack into the Thames. The detonations cannot occur without him. He goes to Shahla, though he does not confess to her. They declare their love for each other.

== Themes ==
The book's peripheral characters play an important part in the general theme of the book. Life for John's wife, in particular, is lonely and boring. John can't engage with her at any level, her children are mysterious teenagers and she feels isolated. She and her circle of friends measure each other on how rich or how thin they are. Radley Graves, a secondary school teacher, becomes dangerously entangled in the fantasy world of "Parallax" the virtual reality game where his character is a sexually aggressive bully. Amanda can't let go of the past, when she used to rule the roost in London now stuck in the country with her alcoholic husband Roger, she can't wait to get back at the least opportunity.

The novel touches on themes that are issues that we face every day: mental illness, terrorism, the recession, and a sense of trying to survive in a world of madness, consumerism and greed. Although the novel explores grim reality, there is hope, and love, a thin seam, but nonetheless, still there.

== Critical reception ==
Justin Cartwright for The Guardian wrote "A Week in December is a little too long, a little too prolix. And yet it survives all this to be a compelling tale of contemporary London".

Gregory Cowles for The New York Times wrote that "this engaging novel is, like John Veals, finally too obsessed with money to serve as a dependable key to anything".
