= Charlotte Gray (film) =

2001 film by Gillian Armstrong

- Theatrical release poster
- Directed by: Gillian Armstrong
- Screenplay by: Jeremy Brock
- Based on: Charlotte Gray by Sebastian Faulks
- Produced by: Sarah Curtis; Douglas Rae
- Starring: Cate Blanchett; Billy Crudup; Michael Gambon; Rupert Penry-Jones; Anton Lesser; Ron Cook; James Fleet
- Cinematography: Dion Beebe
- Edited by: Nicholas Beauman
- Music by: Stephen Warbeck
- Production companies: FilmFour; Senator Film; Ecosse Films
- Distributed by: FilmFour Distributors (UK); Universal Pictures (Select territories; through United International Pictures); Senator Film (Germany); Warner Bros. Pictures (North America)
- Release dates: 28 December 2001 (North America); 22 February 2002 (United Kingdom)
- Running time: 121 minutes
- Countries: United Kingdom; Australia; Germany
- Language: English
- Budget: £14 million
- Box office: $5.3 million

Charlotte Gray is a 2001 romance war drama film directed by Gillian Armstrong. The screenplay was adapted from Sebastian Faulks' 1999 novel Charlotte Gray. It is set in London and Vichy France during World War II. The film stars Cate Blanchett, James Fleet, Abigail Cruttenden, Rupert Penry-Jones, Michael Gambon and Billy Crudup.

The story is based on the exploits of women in Britain's Special Operations Executive (SOE) who worked with the French resistance in Nazi-occupied France.

== Plot ==
In 1942, a young Scot, Charlotte Gray, travels by train to London to take a job in a surgery. Richard Cannerley enters her compartment, asking questions about her life and expressing interest that she is fluent in French. He gives Charlotte his business card with the details of a book launch party. There, he introduces Charlotte to some of his acquaintances and asks her to contact him later. Charlotte enjoys a quick wartime romance with Royal Air Force Flight lieutenant Peter Gregory, whom she met at the party.

Cannerley has recruited Charlotte for the SOE. She is seconded to First Aid Nursing Yeomanry with the rank of Driver. She completes rigorous SOE training. Charlotte learns that Gregory's plane has gone down over occupied France and that he is missing in action. Charlotte signs up for SOE operations in France, partly motivated by her wish to find him.

Charlotte's first mission to France is to deliver radio vacuum tubes. She drops by parachute. In a café, she meets her contact, who is arrested by the police in front of her. Julien, Charlotte's main contact in the French Resistance, reassigns her to act as housekeeper to his father, Levade. Levade is hiding two French Jewish boys, André and Jacob, after their parents were deported to a German concentration camp in Nazi-occupied Poland.

Charlotte participates in a Resistance mission: helping to blow up a train carrying Nazi armaments and soldiers. The Nazis bring their own forces and armoured vehicles to the village to crush the Resistance in the area. Charlotte's SOE contact tells her that Gregory died after his aeroplane was shot down. That night, Julien's Resistance group is ambushed by German soldiers, armed with machine guns. All are killed except Julien. Believing that Charlotte betrayed them, Julien confronts her the next day at his father's house.

A French official arrives to work with the Germans to ensure that their quota for deporting Jews is met. Renech, the village schoolmaster, follows Charlotte. He learns that Levade is hiding Jewish children. He threatens Charlotte with reporting the boys to the Nazis unless she agrees to become his "friend". She promises to meet him the following night.

German soldiers, with Renech and the French official, soon arrive at Levade's house. They question him about his Jewish ancestry, about which Renech apparently informed him. Renech tells Julien that he must betray either his father or the boys (Renech does not care which). Julien announces that his father has a Jewish grandparent and that this means that he himself is therefore of Jewish ancestry. The Germans arrest Levade, who understands Julien, who does not qualify for deportation because he is only 1/8 Jewish, acted to protect the boys.

Renech betrays the boys anyway. The Germans arrive at the boys' new hiding place before Charlotte can get there and capture them. Julien lies in wait for Renech in his apartment and shoots him dead. Julien leaves for southern France. Charlotte refuses to go with him, saying that she still has duties to fulfil. Charlotte smiles when he says that he does not even know her real name.

Evading French police, Charlotte rushes to Levade's house, types a letter and takes it to the railway station where Jews are being loaded into cattle wagons. Hearing the boys and Levade, Charlotte pushes the letter between the boards of their car. Levade reads it aloud to the boys: it purports to be a letter from their parents, encouraging them to care for one another, to eat well, to survive and reminding them of their parents' love. (Note: Although the film suggests that Levade and the Jewish boys are doomed, Faulks's novel states explicitly that they die in a concentration camp.)

Charlotte later leaves France and returns to London. Peter Gregory, who actually survived his aeroplane crash and has been in hiding in France, contacts her, wanting to resume their romance. Charlotte explains that she grieved for him and cannot go back to their romantic relationship. After the war, Charlotte returns to Julien at what was formerly his father's home. For the first time, she tells him that her real name is Charlotte Gray.

== Cast ==
- Cate Blanchett as Charlotte Gray
- James Fleet as Richard Cannerley
- Abigail Cruttenden as Daisy
- Rupert Penry-Jones as Peter Gregory
- Billy Crudup as Julien Levade
- Michael Gambon as Monsieur Levade
- Lewis Crutch as Andre
- Matthew Plato as Jacob
- Anton Lesser as Monsieur Renech
- Ron Cook as Mirabel
- Helen McCrory as Françoise
- David Birkin as Jean-Paul
- John Bennett as Gerard
- Wolf Kahler as Oberleutnant Lindermann
- Jack Shepherd as Paul Pichon

== Production ==
Filming took place between February and May 2001. Exteriors were filmed on location at Saint-Antonin-Noble-Val, in the French department of Tarn-et-Garonne, as well as in England, Scotland and at Pinewood Studios.

== Reception ==
Charlotte Gray received negative reviews from critics. It holds a 32% approval rating on review aggregator website Rotten Tomatoes based on 88 reviews. The critics' consensus said, "A dull adaptation of Sebastian Faulk's [sic] novel despite gorgeous cinematography and Cate Blanchett's best efforts". On Metacritic, the film holds a score of 48 out of 100 based on 28 reviews, indicating "mixed or average reviews".

Charlotte Gray grossed AUD 4,188,497 at the box office in Australia, USD 1,886,566 in the United Kingdom and Ireland, and only USD 741,394 in the United States, where it had a very limited release (widest release was 52 cinemas).

Blanchett was nominated for Best Actress – Drama at the 6th Golden Satellite Awards, ultimately losing to Sissy Spacek for In the Bedroom.
