= Human Traces =

2005 novel by Sebastian Faulks

- First edition (publ. Hutchinson)
- Author: Sebastian Faulks
- Publisher: Hutchinson
- Publication date: September 26, 2005
- ISBN: 978-0-091-79455-2

Human Traces is a 2005 novel by British writer Sebastian Faulks, best known for his novels Birdsong and Charlotte Gray. Human Traces took Faulks five years to write. It tells of two friends who set up a pioneering asylum in 19th-century Austria, in tandem with the evolution of psychiatry and the start of the First World War.

== Plot overview ==
Tracing the intertwined lives of Doctors Thomas Midwinter, who is English, and Jacques Rebière, from Brittany, France, Human Traces explores the development of psychiatry and psychoanalysis in the late 19th century, by way of excursions into first alienism then metaphysics, human evolution and neuroscience, before the search for what it means to be human takes us into a brief foray into the First World War. Central to the plot is the theory of bicameral mentality.

== Background ==
Faulks called the novel "a Sisyphean task", writing, "After spending five years in libraries reading up on madness, psychiatry and psychoanalysis (my office had charts and timelines and things plastered all over the walls), the act of finishing it felt like a bereavement.

== Reception ==
Whilst some have criticised Human Traces as excessively expository, detailed and didactic, it has also been considered wide-ranging, ambitious and well written. It has enjoyed commercial success, having been a bestseller in the United Kingdom.
