= On Green Dolphin Street (novel) =

2001 novel by Sebastian Faulks

- First edition
- Author: Sebastian Faulks
- Language: English
- Genre: Historical fiction
- Set in: 1960
- Publisher: Hutchinson
- Publication date: 2001
- Publication place: United Kingdom
- Media type: Print
- Pages: 356
- ISBN: 0091793505
- OCLC: 924966923

On Green Dolphin Street is a novel by Sebastian Faulks, published by Hutchinson in 2001. The title comes from a 1947 composition by Bronislau Kaper and Ned Washington—written for the Hollywood film Green Dolphin Street—and later recorded by jazz musicians Miles Davis (1958), and Bill Evans (1959), among others. The film was an adaptation of the best-seller novel Green Dolphin Street (1944) by Elizabeth Goudge.

== Literary themes ==
On Green Dolphin Street narrates the troubles, fears, dilemmas, problems and happiness of its main characters. There is an implicit feeling of nostalgia in the novel, a nostalgia for a time when everything seemed possible and life was full of hope and expectations. This, of course, also denotes the idea of disillusionment, a theme Faulkes also explores in his earlier novel, The Long White Winter. This is encapsulated by Mary and Charlie. Charlie has seemingly lost the will to live, or at least he lacks the enthusiasm that he had as a younger man . He has a depressing outlook on life, Mary recognises this sentiment and agrees that life is largely irrational—in that death takes everyone eventually, a theme explored through Mary's mother's death—but sees hope in love. Her relationship with Frank reinvigorates her outlook.

Apart from describing personal problems like drink, adultery and love, the novel also deals with the theme of politics, and political concepts like democracy and freedom. The United States is portrayed from the beginning as a territory facing problems, both internal as well as external. The Civil Rights Movement—which causes some controversy between the characters in the first chapter—and the Cold War contribute to an unstable and threatening atmosphere.

The concepts of freedom and democracy are thus questioned and doubted and it seems as if the novel indirectly compares the state of affairs in the 'democratic' United States with communist Russia. The American citizens are blackmailed (Charlie), driven to commit suicide (Frank's friend, Billy Foy) and deprived of their freedom of speech (Frank).

== Sources ==
- The Telegraph, 28 April 2001, 'Adulterous passions'
- The Guardian, 5 May 2001
