= Birdsong (novel) =

1993 novel by Sebastian Faulks

- First UK edition cover
- Author: Sebastian Faulks
- Language: English
- Genre: War novel, Family saga
- Publisher: Hutchinson
- Publication date: 16 September 1993 (UK)
- Publication place: United Kingdom
- Pages: 407
- ISBN: 0-09-177373-3
- Preceded by: The Girl at the Lion d'Or
- Followed by: Charlotte Gray

Birdsong is a 1993 war novel and family saga by the English author Sebastian Faulks. It is Faulks's fourth novel. The plot follows two main characters living at different times: the first is Stephen Wraysford, a British soldier on the front line in Amiens during the First World War, and the second is his granddaughter, Elizabeth Benson, whose 1970s plotline follows her attempts to recover an understanding of Stephen's experience of the war.

Faulks developed the novel to bring more public awareness to the experience of war remembered by WWI veterans. Most critics found this effort successful, commenting on how the novel, like many other WWI novels, thematically focuses on how the experience of trauma shapes individual psyches. Similarly, because of the parallel narratives WWI and 1970s Britain, the novel explores metahistorical questions about how to document and recover narratives about the past. Because of its genre, themes and writing style, the novel has been favourably compared to a number of other war novels, such as Ian McEwan's Atonement and those in Pat Barker's Regeneration Trilogy.

Birdsong is part of a loose trilogy of novels by Sebastian Faulks, alongside The Girl at the Lion d'Or and Charlotte Gray; the three are linked through location, history and several minor characters. Birdsong is one of Faulks's best-received works, earning both critical and popular praise, including being listed as the 13th favourite book in Britain in a 2003 BBC survey called the Big Read. It has also been adapted four times under the same title: for radio (1997), the stage (2010-2018), television (2012), and the stage once again (2025).

== Background and publication ==
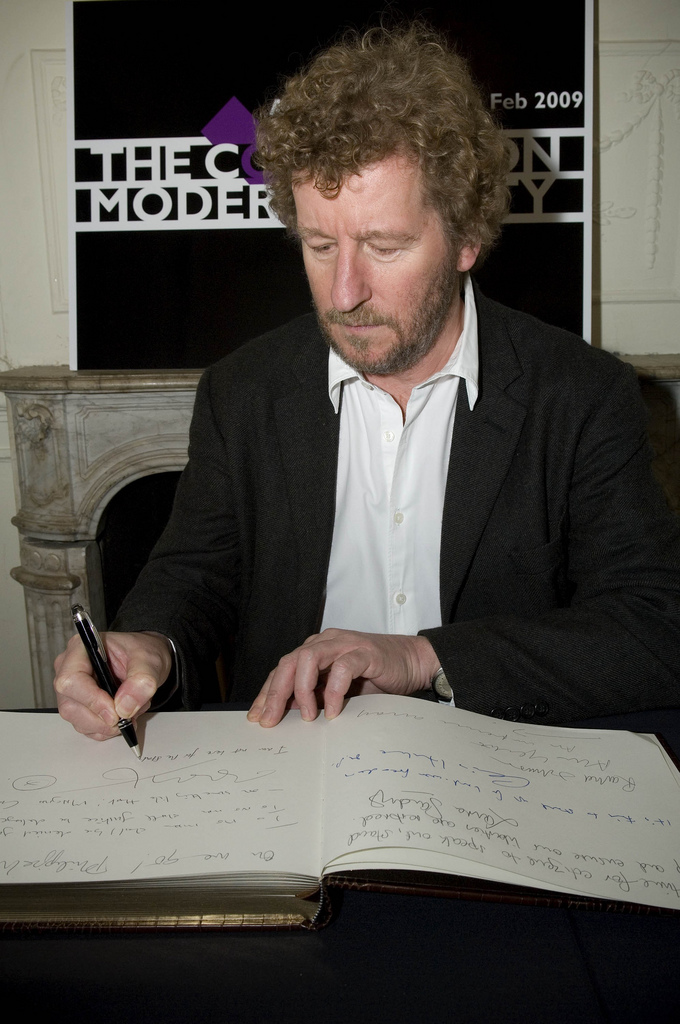
Faulks signing The Convention on Modern Liberty

Faulks wrote the novel partly because he felt that the First World War had not been discussed enough in both literary and historical contexts. Reflecting on the novel twenty years later, Faulks felt that the published version did not fully do justice to the experience of war: it did not provide readers with "a full appreciation of the soldiers' physical experience; and, perhaps more importantly, a philosophical understanding of what it meant to be part of the first genocidal event of the century – the one that made the others imaginable".

Because Faulks felt that much of the extant World War I literature was deeply influenced by World War II literature, he deliberately avoided research with secondary documents, such as historical monographs, instead focusing on veteran interviews and period primary sources.

The novel was a success, with international impact and attention. The hardback print-run, first issued in 1993, sold 14,000 copies. The novel featured in many "Best of the Year lists" in the United Kingdom during 1993. Subsequently, the novel has become one of the most checked-out works from British libraries.

Though Faulks's third published novel in the United Kingdom, Birdsong was only his second republished in the United States. In New Zealand and Australia, the novel was popular, reaching best seller and "what's hot" lists. The novel was also sold in translation in Italy, France, Spain, Latin America, Germany, Portugal, Brazil, Denmark, Poland, Israel, Sweden, Estonia, Japan, Turkey, Bulgaria, Serbia, Finland and the Netherlands. Globally, sales were strong, and as of 2010, the novel had sold over 3 million copies.

== Plot ==
Birdsong has an episodic structure, and is split into seven sections which move between three different periods of time before, during and after the war in the Stephen Wraysford plot, and three different windows of time in the 1970s Benson plot.

=== France 1910 ===
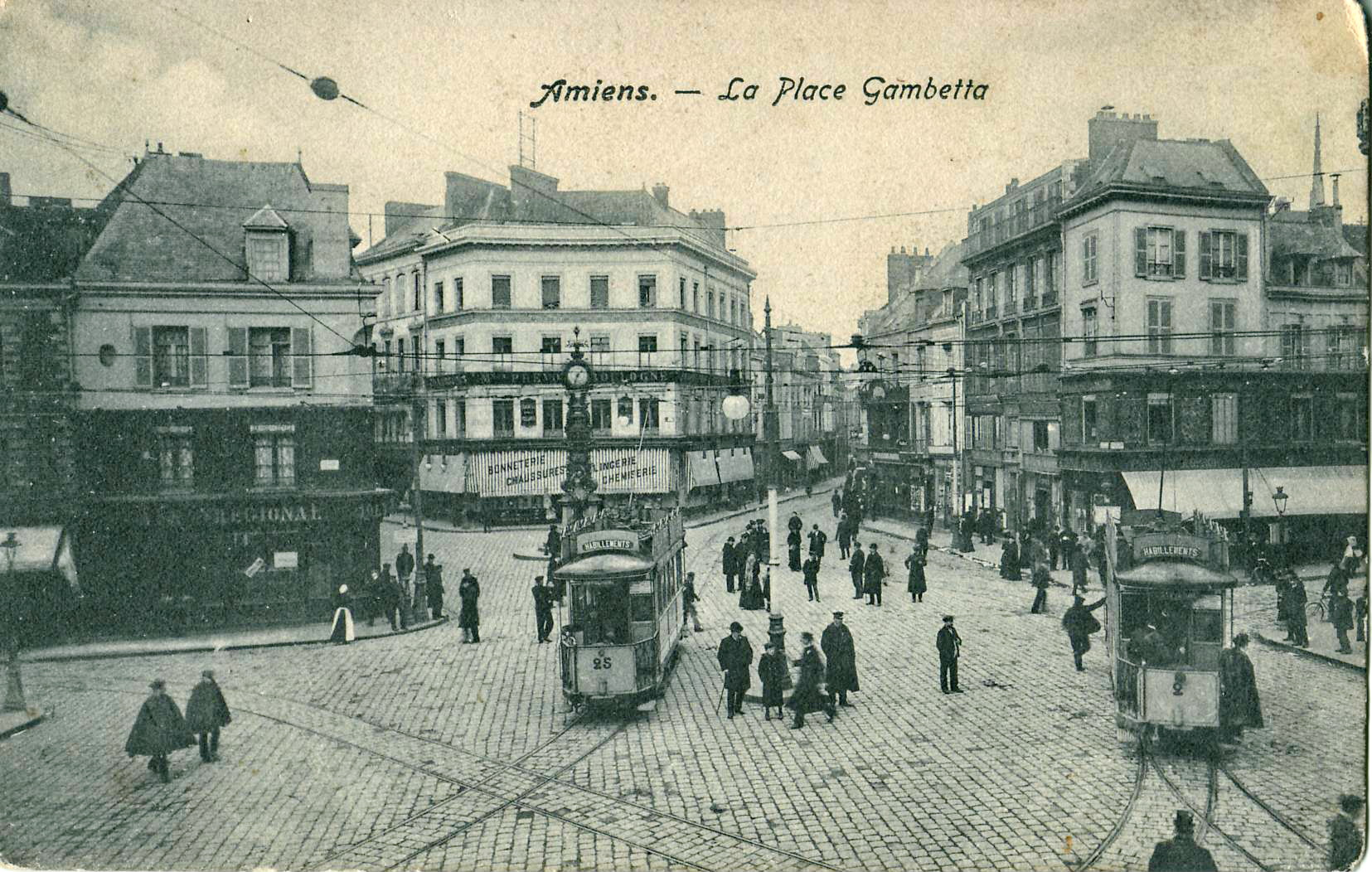
A plaza with trams in pre-War Amiens.

The first stage starts in pre-war Amiens, France. Stephen Wraysford visits and lives with René Azaire, his wife Isabelle and his children. Azaire teaches Stephen about the French textile industry. He witnesses a comfortable middle class life in Northern France alongside industrial worker unrest. Azaire and the significantly younger Isabelle express discontent with their marriage. This sparks Stephen's interest in Isabelle, with whom he soon falls in love. During one incident, Azaire, embarrassed that he and Isabelle cannot have a child, beats her in a jealous rage. Around the same time, Isabelle helps give food to the families of striking workers, stirring rumours that she is having an affair with one of the workers.

Stephen's love of Isabelle transforms into a passionate affair. Isabelle confronts Azaire with the truth of their relationship and Azaire evicts Stephen. Isabelle leaves with him, running away to Southern France. There she becomes pregnant, and momentarily loses faith in her relationship with Stephen. Without telling Stephen, she flees, returning to her family home and the one constant in her life: her sister Jeanne. Later, Isabelle's father makes a deal with Azaire for her return to maintain her honour. Isabelle is welcomed back by Azaire, but she soon regrets leaving her true love, Stephen. However, she does not attempt to contact him.

=== France 1916 ===
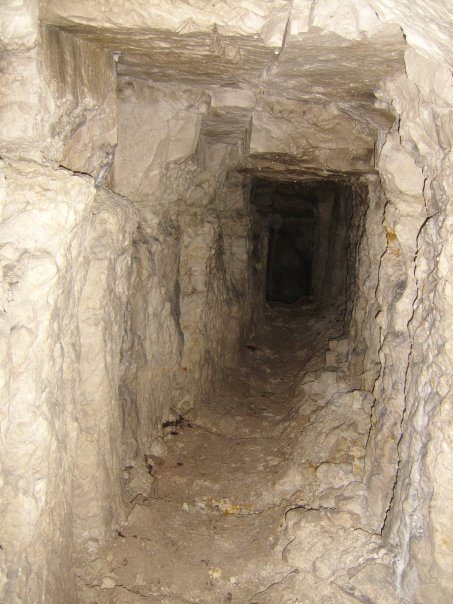
A picture of preserved tunnels constructed as part of the Battle of Vimy Ridge. Stephen supports a crew building similar tunnels.

The second section rejoins Stephen, when he is a lieutenant in the British Army at the start of the war. Through his eyes, Faulks tells the reader about the first day on the Somme in July 1916 and the Battle of Messines near Ypres in the following year.

Several episodes depict a downtrodden Stephen whose only respite is his friendship with Captain Michael Weir and his men. Stephen gains the reputation of a cold and distant officer. He refuses all offers of leave, because he is committed to fighting the war.

His story is interleaved with that of Jack Firebrace, a former miner employed with the tunnelling companies of the Royal Engineers in the British trenches to listen for the enemy and plant mines under the German trenches. In one expedition across No-Man's Land, Stephen is badly injured but survives.

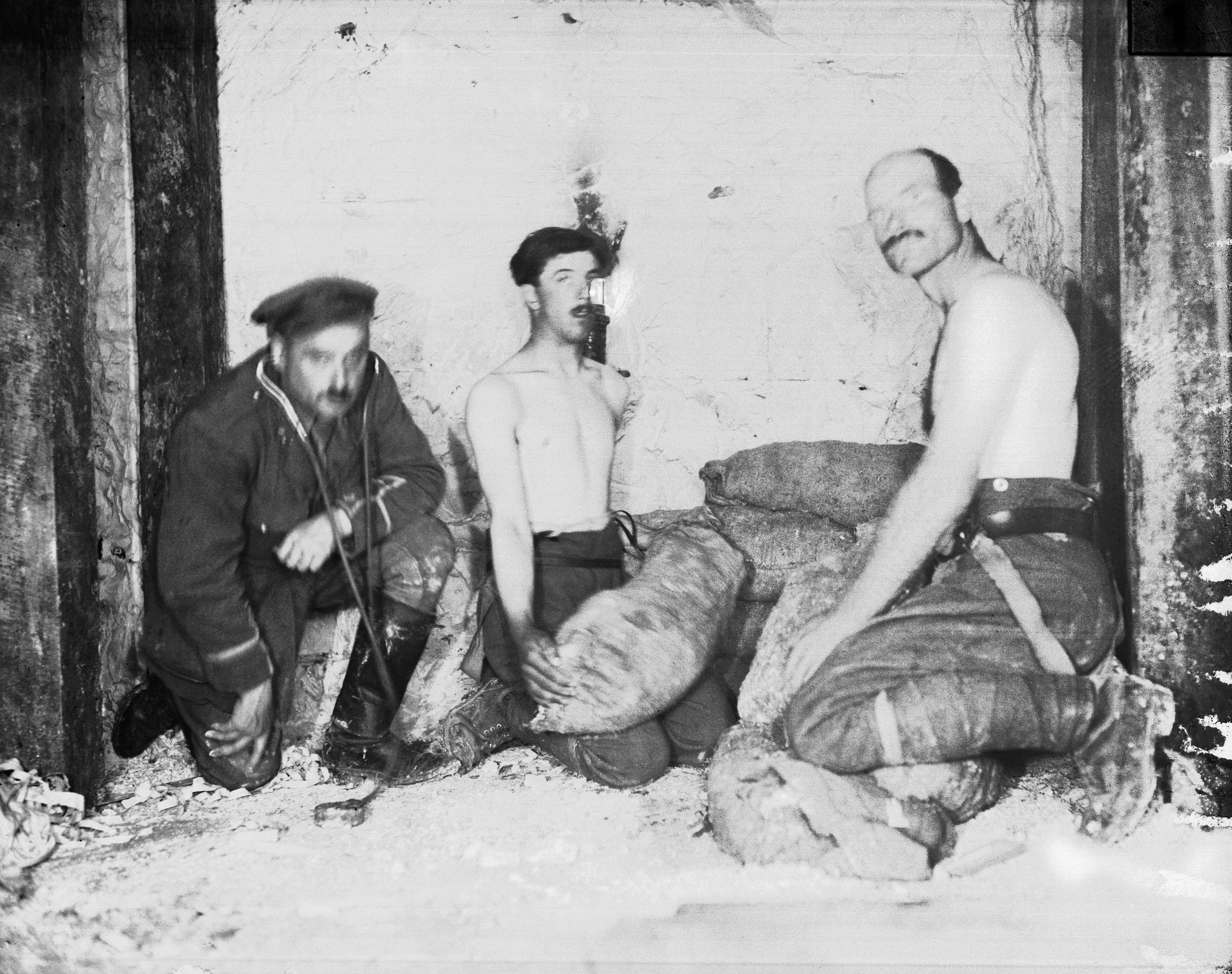
Miners laying charges for one of the mines on the Somme in 1916. These men were of a similar company to the characters represented in the novel.

During these episodes, Stephen feels lonely and writes to Isabelle, feeling that there is no one else to whom he can express his feelings. He writes about his fears that he will die, and confesses that he has only ever loved her.

=== England 1978 ===
Alongside the main story, there is the narrative of Stephen's granddaughter, Elizabeth, who, whilst struggling with her already married boyfriend, Robert, unearths Stephen's journals from World War I and seeks to learn about his experiences at Marne, Verdun and the Somme. She discovers that Stephen's journals are encoded, but tries to decipher them.

=== France 1917 ===
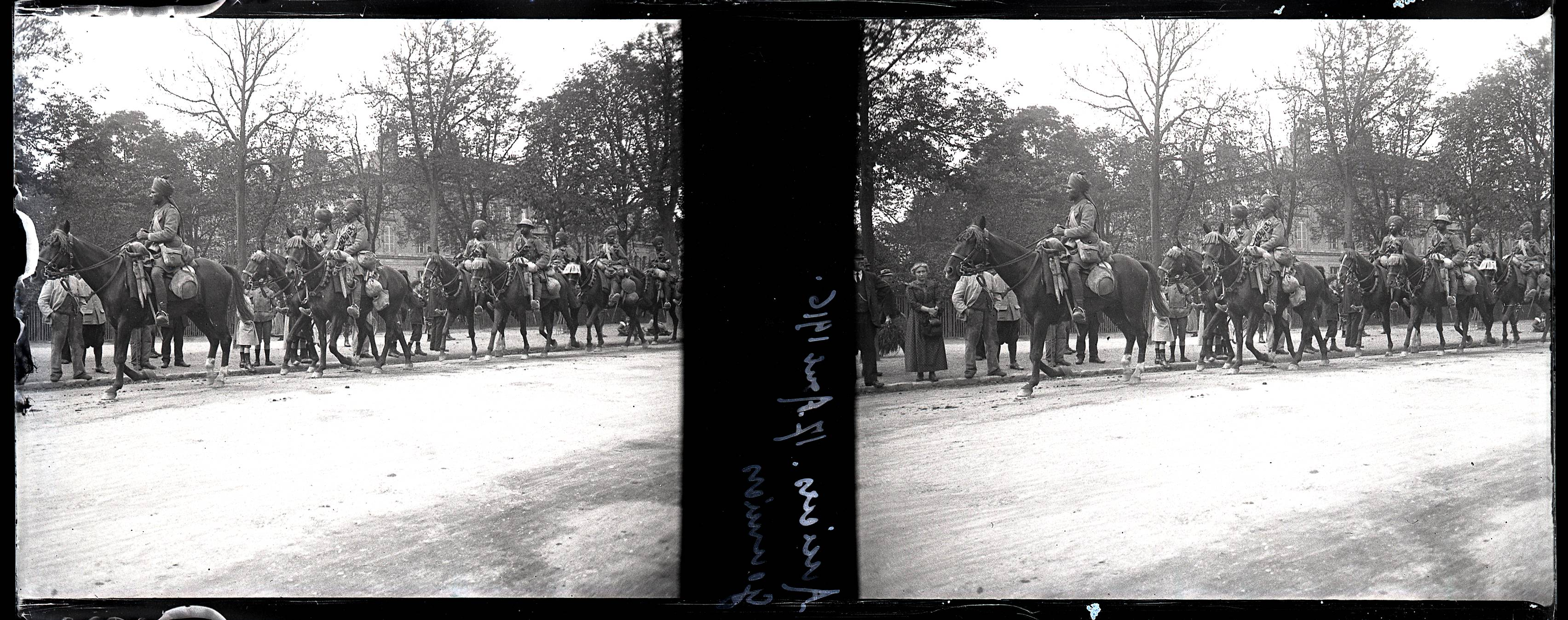
Sikh cavalry passing through the streets of Amiens in 1916.

Stephen has a chance encounter with Jeanne, Isabelle's sister, while on leave in Amiens. During this encounter, Stephen persuades her to allow him to meet with Isabelle. He meets her but finds her face disfigured by a shell with scarring from the injury. Stephen discovers that Isabelle is now in a relationship with Max, a German soldier.

Stephen returns to England briefly, and finds relief at being able to enjoy the Norfolk countryside away from the trenches. When he meets Jeanne again on the way back, he tells her how he dreads returning to the front line after leave. Weir, Stephen's closest friend, is eventually killed by a sniper's bullet while in a trench out on the front line.

=== England 1978–1979 ===
Elizabeth continues researching the war and talks to war veterans Gray and Brennan (who knew Stephen) about their experiences. During this period, she also becomes pregnant with Robert's child.

=== France 1918 ===
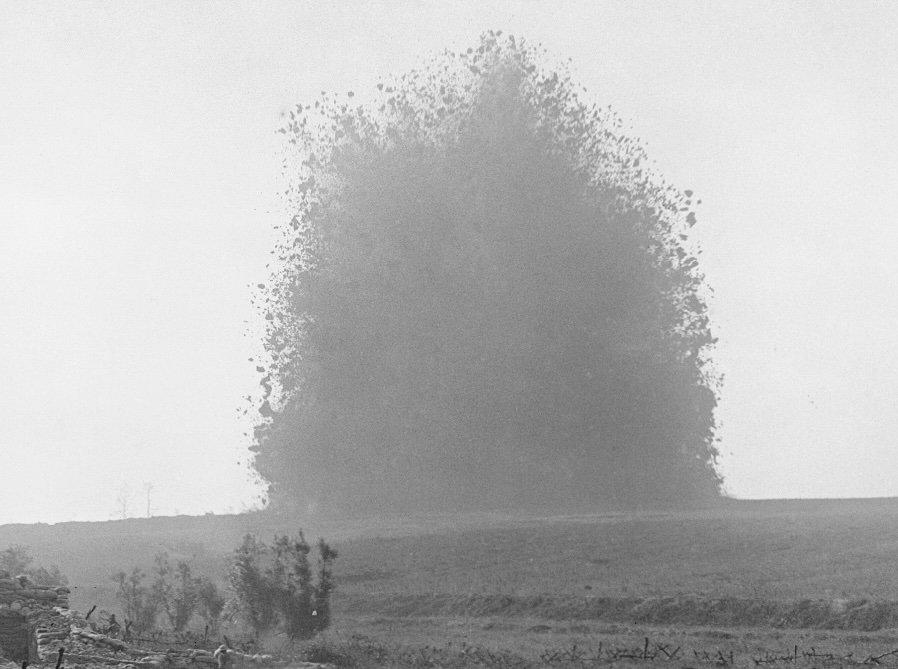
A mine exploding at Hawthorn Ridge Redoubt. A similar explosion traps Stephen and Firebrace below ground, before being rescued by German miners.

The WWI plot ends with Stephen and Firebrace trapped underground after a German mine explosion; with their way out blocked, they talk and share their experiences, with Firebrace grieving for his dead son John and Stephen telling him of his former love for Isabelle. Stephen finds some explosives and Firebrace, himself close to death, tells him how to lay them in order to blast their way out of the tunnel. Before Stephen completes the task, Firebrace dies. The explosion successfully clears a way out for Stephen, and he is rescued by Levi, a Jewish German soldier, as the war ends.

=== England 1979 ===
Elizabeth finally decides to reveal her pregnancy to her mother Françoise, who, to Elizabeth's surprise, is supportive. Over dinner, she learns her mother was raised by Stephen and Jeanne, who married and settled in Norfolk after Elizabeth's grandmother Isabelle's premature death due to the postwar influenza epidemic. Elizabeth and the still-married Robert go on holiday to Dorset, where she goes into labour and has a son, naming him John (after Jack Firebrace's late son). The book ends with Robert walking down the garden of the holiday cottage and having an immense sense of joy.

== Characters ==
=== France: 1910 ===
- René Azaire – Factory owner in Amiens. He states that Stephen will go to Hell for his affair with his wife Isabelle. Embarrassed by his inability to have a child with his wife he beats Isabelle.
- Isabelle Azaire (Madame Azaire) née Fourmentier – René's wife. Isabelle has an affair with Stephen Wraysford while stuck in her unhappy marriage to René. However, Isabelle abandons their relationship, agreeing to return to René (after René is convinced by Isabelle's father) and she is forgiven by the family. She is the mother of Françoise, fathered by Stephen, and initially raised by Isabelle and her partner, Max, a German soldier.
- Lisette – Sixteen-year-old daughter of Azaire, and step-daughter of Isabelle. Lisette is attracted to Stephen, to whom she is nearer in age than Isabelle. She makes suggestive remarks to Stephen throughout his time at the house in Amiens, but goes on to marry a man named Lucien Lebrun.

=== France 1916, 1917 and 1918 ===
- Jack Firebrace – A tunneller or "sewer rat". He survived until 1918 when he became trapped while tunnelling and died.
- Captain Weir – An officer close to Stephen Wraysford killed by a German sniper.
- Jeanne Fourmentier – Isabelle's sister who forms a relationship with Stephen Wraysford.

=== England: 1978 and 1979 ===
- Elizabeth Benson – Granddaughter of Stephen Wraysford. Elizabeth has a job in company which manufactures garments. She wants to find out more about World War I and her grandfather's actions. She does this by phoning elderly servicemen, visiting war memorials and translating Stephen's diary.
- Françoise – Elizabeth's mother, the biological daughter of Stephen and Isabelle who was raised by her father and aunt Jeanne.
- Irene – A colleague of Elizabeth.
- Bob – Irene's husband. He offers to translate the code used in Stephen Wraysford's war diaries for Elizabeth.

== Themes ==
=== Recovering history ===
The novel deals explicitly with the contemporary act of recovering the memory of WWI, and compiling contemporary understanding of those narratives—a function common to works of historiographic metafiction, like Pat Barker's Regeneration Trilogy, A.S. Byatt's Possession, and Ian McEwan's Atonement. The literary scholar Jerome de Groot calls Birdsong one of the first novels of its kind, creating a trend in the 1990s of literary fiction rethinking and reflecting on the World Wars and their historical legacy.

Michael Gorra, a professor of English literature, argues that Faulks seeks to demonstrate that "the past can be recovered, its code can be broken; it can be used to add meaning to contemporary life. Its limitations can be overcome and its promises fulfilled because we know it can heal." The deliberate hiding of Stephen's stories, remaining silent to his family after the war's end and encoding his journals, mirrors the actual loss of record and stories from veterans in post-war Britain. Elizabeth's search for that history is a process of recovering that memory in order to gain a greater emotional relationships with her grandfather, to whom she had never felt connected. Writing in the British Medical Journal, the medical doctor Paul Slade described reading about this investigation of another person's history to illuminate how "superficial" his own patient histories practice had been.

Gorra described the novel's split into parallel narratives as the critical fault in the reading experience of the novel. For de Groot, however, the split structure provides one of the most sophisticated elements of the novel. De Groot writes that Benson's investigation of personal history allows Faulks to examine the difference between the two perspectives on the memory, highlighting the "unknowability of the horror of war" and of history more generally.

=== Trauma ===
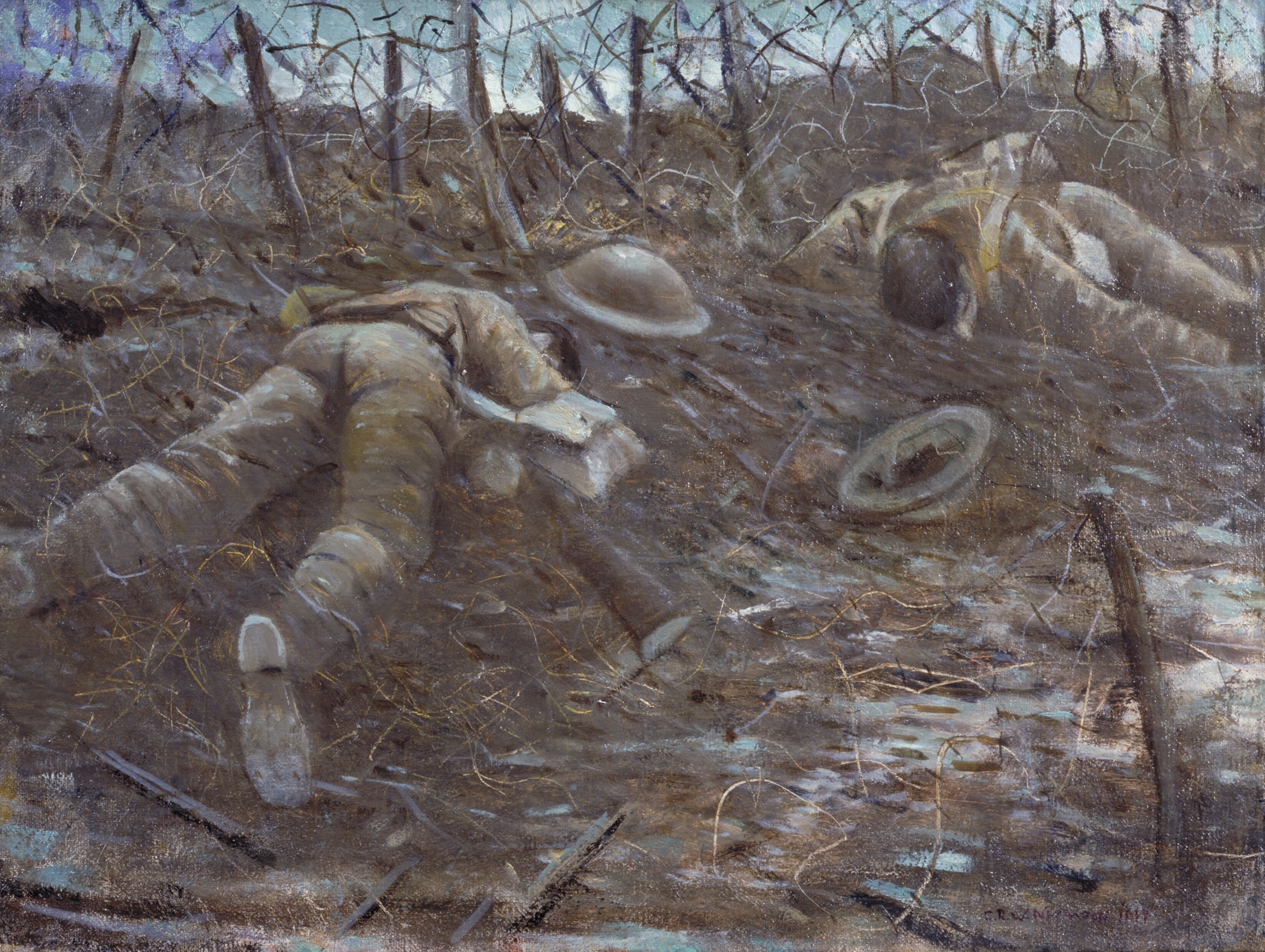
Death surrounded British soldiers on the front line, often to the point of breaking their psychological endurance. Faulks explores this historical trauma, throughout the novel. Painting by C. R. W. Nevinson, 1917.

Like other novels documenting WWI, the shock and trauma of death is embedded throughout the book's depiction of the war. John Mullen, reviewing the book for The Guardian, described the depictions of the Battle of the Somme particularly brutal. According to scholar Marzena Sokołowska-Paryż, Faulks treats the war as a way to "test human endurance" and explore the effect of carnage on the psyche. A reviewer for Kirkus Reviews also highlighted this theme, writing that "the war, here, is Faulks's real subject, his stories of destroyed lives, however wrenching, only throwing its horror into greater relief and making it the more unbearable".

The contemporary historian Simon Wessley describes the novel, alongside Barker's Regeneration, as an exemplar of contemporary fiction which uses the experience of the World War I trenches to examine more contemporary understandings of PTSD. De Groot argues that this reinvestigation of a traumatic history mirrors a growing interest among both literary authors and historians in trauma as a thematic subject.

The historian Ross J. Wilson noted that this reinvestigation of the traumas of the World Wars revisits and revives the experience of trauma within contemporary culture. Faulks uses both different narrators and different narrative perspectives (first, third and omniscient) on the death in the trenches to explore the trauma of death in numerous and challenging ways. For Mullen, this gives the effect of "[t]he novelist painfully manipulat[ing] the reader's emotions."

== Style ==
The novel frequently changes narrative perspectives, using a significant amount of interior monologue, direct speech and dramatic irony. Though employing an omniscient narrator who occasionally describes the events from a broad perspective, the novel tends to shadow a handful of characters closely, principally Stephen Wraysford, Isabelle Azair, Michael Weir, Jack Firebrace and Elizabeth Benson.

Pat Wheeler, a scholar of literature, describes the narrative style as "both naturalistic and realistic and very much in the manner of the nineteenth century writers [Faulks] cites as literary influences"—Wheeler notes Émile Zola, Charles Dickens and George Gissing among these. Wheeler emphasizes that the naturalistic tendencies of the narrative allow treatment of the war setting without an idealization of the "human" parts of the narrative. Consistently, reviews emphasize the novel's imagery of the battle experience in and amongst the trenches. For Slade, the novel "produces a vivid and traumatizing description of the sights and sounds of life and death in (and under the trenches)"; the principal cause of this, he says, is "the pure fury and intensity of the imagery created page after page".

== Reception ==
Birdsong is one of Faulks's best-received works of fiction, both by the public and amongst reviewers. The British press offered considerable praise, with positive reviews from Today, The Guardian, The Observer, The Daily Mail, The Mail on Sunday, The Sunday Express, The Sunday Telegraph, The Times Literary Supplement, The Spectator and The Scotsman. American and other international press reviews were similarly positive.

The novel's popular reception was similarly positive. Birdsong came 13th in a 2003 BBC survey called the Big Read, which aimed to find Britain's favourite book. It received an "Also Mentioned" credit in The Observer's 2005 poll of critics and writers to find the "Best British book of the last 25 years" (1980–2005). Birdsong was listed in The Telegraph as one of the most consistently high selling books of 1998–2008, continuously in the top 5,000 sales figures.

Reviews of the novel often focus on the fluid reading experience as well as the novel's effective treatment of "'real' people" within the trauma of war. Gorra describes the novel as mostly a strong WWI novel, characterising it as "superb" with prose that is "spare and precise". The review published in Kirkus Reviews was glowing: "Once more, Faulks shows his unparalleled strengths as a writer of plain human life and high, high compassion. A wonderful book, ringing with truth."

Consistently one of the greatest criticisms of the novel concerns its 1970s plot-line. For example, Gorra found that the addition of a parallel narrative "[ran] into problems"—especially concerning Elizabeth Benson, whom he "stopped believing in [as a] character". Unlike other reviewers, the critic Sarah Belo did not question the historical investigation plot, but the depiction of Elizabeth's experience as a 1970s woman in England. On the other hand, almost all of the reviewers describe the novel's war sections as excellently written; for example, the review in the Los Angeles Times called the sections "so powerful as to be almost unbearable".

The novel has been favourably compared to other World War I and II novels, including All Quiet on the Western Front, The Young Lions and War and Remembrance. Gorra described the novel as even more original than Barker's The Ghost Road and the rest of her Regeneration Trilogy. Kate Saunders, reviewing Birdsong for The Sunday Times, praised the novel and described it as "without the political cynicism that colours more modern treatments of this catastrophe". Reviewers have also compared the novel to other literary works; for example, for one critic, the lead up to the Somme was as persuasive as the "scene in Henry V before the Battle of Agincourt", while the novelist Suzanne Ruta writes that Faulks creates characters with a similar depth to those in Thomas Hardy novels.

== Adaptations ==
Birdsong was adapted as a radio drama of the same title in 1997, and as a stage play in 2010. The play adaptation was first directed by Trevor Nunn at the Comedy Theatre in London.

In 2012 it was adapted as a two-part television drama for the BBC. The production starred Eddie Redmayne as Stephen Wraysford and Clémence Poésy as Isabelle Azaire, and was directed by Philip Martin, based on a screenplay by Abi Morgan. The historian Edward Madigan favourably compared the television adaptation to Steven Spielberg's War Horse as a successful evocation of the experience of the World War I trenches.

In both 2013 and 2014, Faulks indicated that a feature film adaptation was in development. The screenplay is by Rupert Wyatt, and the film is expected to star Nicholas Hoult.

In 2020, Original Theatre produced an online film version of the novel, that featured Faulks as the narrator.
