= Sebastian Faulks =

British novelist, journalist and broadcaster

Sebastian Faulks CBE FRSL
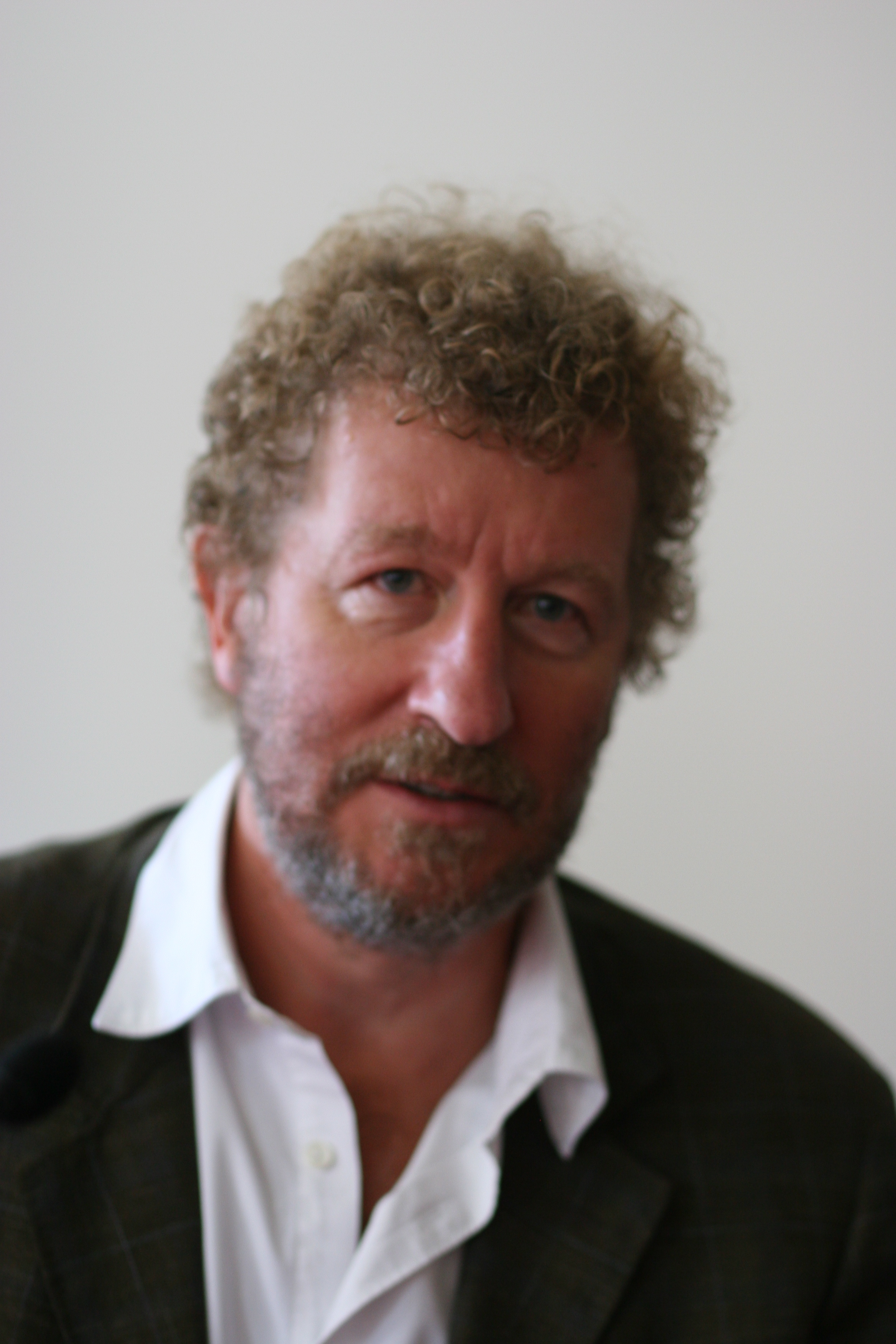
- Faulks in 2008
- Born: 20 April 1953 (age 73); Donnington, Berkshire, England
- Education: Emmanuel College, Cambridge
- Occupation: Novelist
- Known for: The French Trilogy
- Spouse: Veronica Youlten (m. 1989)
- Children: 3
- Relatives: Edward Faulks, Baron Faulks (brother); Sir Neville Faulks (uncle)
- Website: https://www.sebastianfaulks.com

Sebastian Charles Faulks (born 20 April 1953) is a British novelist, journalist and broadcaster. He is most notable for his historical novels set in France – The Girl at the Lion d'Or, Birdsong and Charlotte Gray.

He has also published novels with a contemporary setting, most recently A Week in December (2009) and Paris Echo (2018), and a James Bond continuation novel, Devil May Care (2008), as well as a continuation of P. G. Wodehouse's Jeeves series, Jeeves and the Wedding Bells (2013). He was a team captain on BBC Radio 4 literary quiz The Write Stuff.

== Biography ==
=== Early life ===
Faulks was born on 20 April 1953 in Donnington, Berkshire, to Peter Faulks and Pamela (née Lawless). His father was a decorated soldier (he won the Military Cross), who later became a solicitor and circuit judge. His brother Edward Faulks, Baron Faulks KC, a barrister, became a Conservative Government Minister in January 2014 in the Ministry of Justice. His uncle was Sir Neville Faulks, a High Court judge.

He was educated at Elstree School, Reading, and went on to Wellington College, Berkshire. He read English at Emmanuel College, Cambridge, of which he was made an honorary fellow in 2008. Whilst at Cambridge he participated in University Challenge, in which Emmanuel College lost in the opening round. Faulks commented that his team was most probably hampered by a trip to the pub before the show, as recommended by the show's producer.

=== Career ===
After graduating, Faulks worked as a teacher at a private school in Camden Town, and then as a journalist for the Daily and Sunday Telegraph. Faulks's first novel, A Trick of the Light, was published in 1984. He continued to work as a journalist, becoming the first literary editor of The Independent in 1986. He became deputy editor of the Independent on Sunday in 1989; in the same year he published The Girl at the Lion d'Or, the first of his historical novels set in France. In 1991 he left The Independent. He wrote for various newspapers as a freelancer for the next ten years.

Following the success of Birdsong (1993), Faulks quit journalism to write full-time. He has since published eight novels, the most recent being Where My Heart Used to Beat (2015), Paris Echo (2018) and Snow Country (2021). Faulks was elected a Fellow of the Royal Society of Literature in 1993 and appointed CBE for services to literature in 2002.

Faulks appears regularly on British TV and radio. He was a regular team captain on BBC Radio 4's literary quiz The Write Stuff (1998–2014). The quiz involves the panellists each week writing a pastiche of the work of a selected author; Faulks has published a collection of his efforts as a book, Pistache (2006), which was described in The Scotsman as "a little treasure of a book. Faulks can catch, and caricature, another writers' fingerprints and foibles with a delicious precision that only a deep love of writing can teach."

In 2011 Faulks presented a four-part BBC Two series called Faulks on Fiction, looking at the British novel and its characters. He also wrote a series tie-in book of the same name.

=== Personal life ===
Faulks married Veronica (née Youlten) in 1989. They have two sons, William and Arthur, born 1990 and 1996 respectively, and one daughter, Holly, born 1992. Faulks is a fan of West Ham United football club. Debrett's lists his recreations as tennis and wine.

A longtime cricket fan and player, Faulks is a member of the Authors XI cricket team.

In August 2014, Faulks was one of 200 public figures who were signatories to a letter to The Guardian opposing Scottish independence in the run-up to September's referendum on that issue.

From 2013 to 2018, he sat on the Government Advisory Group for the Commemoration of the First World War.

== Novels ==
Faulks is most notable for his three novels set in early twentieth-century France. The first, The Girl at the Lion d'Or, was published in 1989. This was followed by Birdsong (1993), and Charlotte Gray (1998). The latter two were best-sellers, and Charlotte Gray was shortlisted for the James Tait Black Memorial Prize. In April 2003 Birdsong came 13th in the BBC's Big Read initiative which aimed to identify Britain's best loved novels.

In 2007, Faulks published Engleby. Set in Cambridge in the 1970s, it is narrated by Cambridge University fresher Mike Engleby. Engleby is a loner, and the reader is led to suspect that he may be unreliable, particularly when a fellow student disappears. Faulks says of the novel's genesis, "I woke up one morning with this guy's voice in my head. And he was just talking, dictating, almost. And when I got to work, I wrote it down. I didn't know what the hell was going on; this wasn't an idea for a book." It was remarked upon as a change of direction for Faulks, both in terms of the near-contemporary setting and in the decision to use a first-person narrator. The Daily Telegraph said the book was "distinguished by a remarkable intellectual energy: a narrative verve, technical mastery of the possibilities of the novel form and vivid sense of the tragic contingency of human life."

To mark the 2008 centenary of Ian Fleming's birth, the author's estate in 2006 commissioned Faulks to write a new James Bond novel. Faulks has said of the commission: "I'd just finished Human Traces and it seemed ridiculous. You've just spent five years in a Victorian lunatic asylum and then you go on to James Bond. But I think their hope is they'll get two markets. The more I think about it, the more I think it was clever of them, because the mismatch is intriguing." The result, Devil May Care, became an immediate best-seller in the UK, selling 44,093 hardback copies within four days of release. The Observer's review of the novel stated: "Faulks has done in some ways an absolutely sterling job. He has resisted pastiche", and blamed the book's weaknesses on the character of Bond as created by Fleming. Mark Lawson, writing in The Guardian, praised it as "a smart and enjoyable act of literary resurrection. Among the now 33 post-Fleming Bonds, this must surely compete with Kingsley Amis's for the title of the best".

Faulks's 2009 novel, A Week in December, takes place in the seven days leading up to Christmas in December 2007. It concerns the lives of a varied cast of characters living in London; Faulks himself has described the novel as "Dickensian" and cites Bleak House and Our Mutual Friend as influences, as well as New York novelists such as Tom Wolfe and Jay McInerney. The book was partly a response to the banking crisis. He chose to set it specifically in 2007 because "the whole world had changed: the banks were collapsing, we were facing Armageddon, and I understood then that I couldn't make this book right up to the moment[...] I chose that time because then the writing's on the wall, and it should be clear to anyone half-sensible that the game is up, but they're still going on." Other plot threads in the novel concern reality television, and Islamic militancy. While publicising the book, Faulks received some criticism for negative remarks he made about the Koran; he was quick to offer "a simple but unqualified apology to my Muslim friends and readers for anything that has come out sounding crude or intolerant. Happily, there is more to the book than that". Reviews for the novel were mixed. Tibor Fischer, in the Daily Telegraph, praised the novel's "comic élan", but felt it was "uneven" and criticised the character of John Veals as "lifeless". Mark Lawson wrote in The Guardian, "an honest critic must surely conclude that Faulks has correctly identified the novel that needs to be written about these times, but may also have proved that British society is now so various that no single writer can capture all its aspects. However, in honourably failing to depict the entire state of the nation, Faulks has memorably skewered the British literary world."

The Seventh Son was published in September 2023. Despite some reservations, Melissa Katsoulis praised the book in The Times and stated that there are "some high ideas at work here and, as with the best dystopian fictions, all the crazy future science stuff feels scary precisely because it’s close to happening already."

=== Reception ===
The Literary Review has said that "Faulks has the rare gift of being popular and literary at the same time"; The Sunday Telegraph called him "One of the most impressive novelists of his generation ... who is growing in authority with every book". Faulks's 2005 novel, Human Traces, was described by Trevor Nunn as "A masterpiece, one of the great novels of this or any other century."

== Adaptations of novels ==
In 2001 Charlotte Gray was made into a film starring Cate Blanchett and directed by Gillian Armstrong. In 2010 a stage version of Birdsong, adapted by Rachel Wagstaff (who had previously adapted The Girl at the Lion d'Or for radio) and directed by Trevor Nunn, opened at the Comedy Theatre in London; the production ran for only 4 months. It was subsequently rewritten by Wagstaff and made four successful nationwide tours. In 2012, Birdsong was made into a two-part BBC TV serial, written by Abi Morgan, directed by Philip Martin and starring Eddie Redmayne. This followed several attempts to film the novel.

== Honours and awards ==
- 1994 British Book Awards Author of the Year.
- 1994 Franco British Society Award (winner) for Birdsong.
- 1997 Premio Bancarella Italy (shortlist) for Birdsong.
- 1998 James Tait Black Memorial Prize for fiction (shortlist) for Charlotte Gray.
- 2002 Appointed a Commander of the Order of the British Empire (CBE), "For services to Literature".
- 2006 Honorary doctorate, Tavistock Clinic, University of East London.
- 2009 British Book Awards Popular Fiction Award (winner) for Devil May Care.
- 2010 Honorary doctorate, University of Hertfordshire.
- 2010 City of Zaragoza Award for Fiction (winner) for Birdsong.
- 2014 Bollinger Everyman Award (shortlist) for Jeeves and the Wedding Bells
- 2016 Tolstoy Prize, Moscow (shortlist) for Birdsong.
- 2018 Specsavers National Book Awards UK Author (shortlist) for Paris Echo.

== Bibliography ==
=== The French (Charles Hartmann) Trilogy ===
1. The Girl at the Lion d'Or (1989)
2. Birdsong (1993)
3. Charlotte Gray (1999)

=== Other novels ===
- A Trick of the Light (1984)
- A Fool's Alphabet (1992)
- On Green Dolphin Street (2001)
- Human Traces (2005)
- Engleby (2007)
- Devil May Care (2008)
- A Week in December (2009)
- A Possible Life (2012)
- Jeeves and the Wedding Bells (2013)
- Where My Heart Used to Beat (2015)
- Paris Echo (2018)
- Snow Country (2021)
- The Seventh Son (2023)

Farewell to Eden. (2026)

=== Non-fiction ===
- The Fatal Englishman (1996)
- Pistache (2006)
- Faulks on Fiction: Great British Characters and the Secret Life of the Novel (2011)
- Pistache Returns (2016)
- Fires which Burn Brightly (2025)

=== Anthology ===
- with Hope Wolf (eds). A Broken World: Letters, Diaries and Memories of the Great War Hutchinson, London 2014, ISBN 978-0-09-195422-2
