= Charlotte Gray (novel) =

1999 novel by Sebastian Faulks

- First edition cover
- Author: Sebastian Faulks
- Language: English
- Genre: War novel
- Publisher: Random House Trade
- Publication date: February 1999
- Publication place: United Kingdom
- Media type: Print (Hardback)
- Pages: 399 pp (first edition, hardback)
- ISBN: 0-375-50169-X (first edition, hardback)
- OCLC: 39391219
- Preceded by: Birdsong

Charlotte Gray is a 1998 novel by Sebastian Faulks. Faulks completes his loose trilogy of books about France with this story of the adventures of a young Scotswoman, Charlotte Gray, who becomes an agent of Britain's Special Operations Executive (SOE) assigned to work with the French Resistance in Vichy France, during World War II. Although denied by the author, the story and title character have been compared to the exploits of SOE agents Nancy Wake and Pearl Witherington.

== Film adaptation ==
A film based on the book was produced in 2001. It stars Cate Blanchett and was directed by Gillian Armstrong.

== Plot summary ==
In 1942, a young Scot, Charlotte Gray, travels to London to take a job as a medical receptionist for a Harley Street doctor. On the train she talks to two men sharing her compartment, and one of them - who works for the secret service - gives her his card. Despite the war, social life in London is in full swing and the attractive, intelligent girl soon meets up with an airman, Peter Gregory. The temporary nature of life at the time is epitomised when she quickly loses her virginity and then falls in love with him. The romance is heightened when Gregory is sent on a mission over France and news comes back to Charlotte that he is missing in action. Charlotte spent much of her childhood in France and speaks the language fluently - a talent that the secret service wishes to exploit in its effort to support the French Resistance. Charlotte decides to throw in her job - which she has no talent for anyway, as the doctor informs her - and joins a Special Operations Executive (SOE)* training course. Once the SOE has grilled her on methods of interrogation, dyed her hair a mousy brown, and replaced her fillings, Charlotte is parachuted into France to complete a specified mission. But instead of doing her job and heading home, she sets out to find Gregory's whereabouts.

== Historical reference ==
The SOE in France included a number of women. Most of these women were made members of the First Aid Nursing Yeomanry. F Section alone sent 39 female agents into the field, of whom 13 did not return.

It has been claimed that the character of Charlotte Gray was based on a New Zealand-born Australian woman called Nancy Wake, who worked with the French Resistance near a village called Verneix in the Auvergne region. However, this claim has been rejected by the author.

== Notice ==
The author received the Bad Sex in Fiction Award 1998 for this book.
