= The Patrick Leigh Fermor Archive =

Collection of items relating to Patrick Leigh Fermor

- Housed at: The National Library of Scotland
- Funded by: John R. Murray Charitable Trust and others
- Size (no. of items): 10,000 +

The Patrick Leigh Fermor Archive is a collection of over 10,000 items of correspondence, literary manuscripts, articles and research papers, diaries, passports, sketches and photographs relating to Sir Patrick 'Paddy' Leigh Fermor (11 February 1915 – 10 June 2011), a British author, scholar, veteran, and adventurer. The bulk of the collection, the Papers of Patrick Leigh Fermor, was purchased by the National Library of Scotland (NLS) in 2012 from Fermor's estate, using funds donated by the John R. Murray Charitable Trust, and is housed at the Library's main building on George IV Bridge in Edinburgh, Scotland. It was made available to the general public in November 2014.

== History ==
Leigh Fermor had many careers and interests over the course of his life, and left behind a vast collection of papers, many of which are now held within the Archive. He played a prominent role behind the lines in the Cretan resistance during World War II and it was widely regarded as Britain's greatest living travel writer during his lifetime, based on books such as The Broken Road (2013) and A Time of Gifts (1977).

== Composition of the Papers of Patrick Leigh Fermor ==
The Patrick Leigh Fermor Archive contains materials dating back to 1934, the year Fermor purchased his first passport, to 2011 when he died. It consists of various papers relating to his life and travels, including letters between him and poet John Betjeman. Correspondence between Fermor and his publisher John Murray VI is also included within the archive, as is the only surviving notebook from his trek across Europe in 1933. Cataloguing the collection took over a year and it has been arranged into nine categories by its curators.

=== Correspondence ===
This series is mostly made up of correspondence between Patrick Fermor and his wife, Joan Leigh Fermor (5 February 1912 – 4 June 2003), though there are also several personal letters to and from Fermor. The 500 letters written between him and Mairi Bostanzi from 1988 to 2010 can also be found in this section. Bostanzi helped to provide Fermor with new ideas for his writing in a similar way his friend and writing advisor Rudolf 'Rudi' Fischer (17 September 1923 – 18 February 2016) did. There are around 400 letters between Fischer and Fermor in the Archive, some of these include postcards and other miscellaneous materials. Financial and literary correspondence make up a small section of this series and includes items like bank statement and letters to his publishers. Fermor wrote letters to many politicians, military officials and state figures, such as Prince Charles and Virginia Tsouderou, these too are included in this series.

=== Literary manuscripts and typescripts ===
The literary manuscripts and typescripts in the Archive include both major published works and minor published and unpublished works, many of which have been annotated and corrected by Fermor himself, significant as it is demonstrative of his writing process. Bound manuscripts of Fermor's now published books are included here too, The Traveller's Tree (1950) being one of them. The minor works sub-series of this part of the Archive are further divided into Articles, Speeches and contributions to books, Book reviews, Forewords and introductions, Translations of works by others, Obituaries, memoirs and eulogies, Poems and jeux d'esprit, Translations of Patrick Leigh Fermor's works, and Other works by Patrick Leigh Fermor. There are various press cuttings and other printed materials to be found in this series as well.

=== Works by others concerning Patrick Leigh Fermor ===
This series contains mainly of articles and reviews in various languages about Fermor and his works. Also included here are fragments of an interview he had with Ben Downing along with some letters exchanged between the two (2000–2008) and a copy of Downing's Philhellene's Progress: Patrick Leigh Fermor written in 2001. Fermor's Curriculum Vitae can be found here as well.

=== Research files ===
The research files have been divided into three subseries entitled Other authors' works, Patrick and Joan Leigh Fermor family and personal history research files, and Friends and personal interests research files. Contained within each of these are manuscript and typescript drafts and printed items, though of particular note are the 'India letters' – correspondence written from the family to Amy Ambler, Fermor's maternal grandmother. Obituaries and memoirs by other writers can also be found in this series, as well as a wide range of miscellaneous printed items, press cuttings and photocopies.

=== World War II ===
This series contains many manuscripts and typescript drafts, as well as printed items, by Fermor and those who knew him. Much of the material found within this section is in Greek. There are many items here which concern the abduction of General Kreipe, including annotated manuscripts and typescripts of Fermor's Abducting a General. Abducting a General was an article commissioned in 1966 by Barrie Pitt and was initially only meant to be 5000 words in length. It ended up growing to over 32,000 words and was published posthumously in 2014 as Abducting a General: The Kreipe Operation and SOE in Crete. Also included in the World War II series is a notable amount of materials relating to Ill Met by Moonlight which include the film itself, related press cuttings, a video cassette tape of its original broadcast, plus interviews with Fermor and other people who worked on the film. This section also contains war reports and articles and speeches by Fermor to do with the war in Crete.

=== Personal papers of Patrick Leigh Fermor ===
Personal effects such as passports and diaries can be found in this series of the Archive. Ten of Fermor's passports are included here dated from 1934 (his first passport) until 2013, two years after he died. There are over twenty diaries in this section two, spanning nearly fifty years. His journals, address books and notebooks are located here as well, as are other miscellaneous items such as award certificates and a map of Romania and North Bulgaria (1913), used by Fermor on his trek from the Hook of Holland to Constantinople (1934) with annotations made later.

=== Papers of and concerning Joan Leigh Fermor ===
Similar to the above section on Patrick Leigh Fermor's personal papers, this series consists of pocket diaries, address books and miscellaneous material of and concerning his wife Joan Leigh Fermor, as well as personal correspondence between the couple.

=== Photographs and visual material ===
This series consists of photographs and other visual material relating to Fermor such as individual sketches, sketchbooks, and promotional posters. Significant items included here are photographs taken by William Stanley Moss in Crete during the occupation, photographs taken at Kardamyli, and photographs concerning particular works like those used to illustrate Fermor's books and stills from movies.

=== Published books ===
This series is mainly made up of books written by Fermor that have been published, such as A Time to Keep Silence (1953), A Time of Gifts (1977), and Between the Woods and the Water (1986). Those books included here not written by Fermor have either corrections and annotations made by him or inscriptions dedicated to him and his wife.

== Subsequent additions to the Archive ==
=== Annotated photocopied typescript of Patrick Leigh Fermor's corrected volume III ===
This item was presented to the National Library of Scotland by Caroline Westmore of John Murray publishing in 2015. It is an annotated photocopied typescript of Fermor's corrected volume III, the final part of his book trilogy. This final book was published as The Broken Road in 2013. A Time of Gifts (1977) and Between the Woods and the Water (1986) are the other two volumes included in the trilogy.

=== Further literary papers of Patrick Leigh Fermor ===
This series consists of papers and drafts related to a proposed publication of Fermor's minor writings. These include: Peru in 1971; Spain in 1975; Pyrenees in 1978; Hellespont in 1984; and Albania in 2007. It was presented to the National Library of Scotland in March 2015 by Artemis Cooper.

=== Letters of Patrick and of Joan Leigh Fermor to Bent Juel-Jensen ===
These materials were acquired by the National Library of Scotland in 2018 from Bernard Quaritch, a rare book shop in London, UK. In this addition is one letter and two postcards of Patrick Leigh Fermor and two letters from Joan Leigh Fermor, all addressed to Bent Juel-Jensen, an Oxford-based physician, scholar, and book collector.

=== Letters of Patrick Leigh Fermor to Eva Békássy v. Gescher ===
There are 30 letters and postcards of Fermor to Eva Békássy v. Gescher spanning almost 20 years from 1979 to 1997, and one letter of Gescher to Fermor, dated 1988. Also kept with these is a single photocopied letter of Anne Olivier Bell to Fermor, sent in 1980. The National Library of Scotland received this collection from Farkas Zsófia, Gescher's niece, in 2015.

=== Letters of Patrick Leigh Fermor to Michael and Joey Casey ===
These letters were presented to the National Library of Scotland by Joey Casey in 2015. There are four letters in total from Fermor addressed to Michael and Joey Casey, dated 2004–2005. Michael Casey was Joan Leigh Fermor's nephew and Joey Casey was his wife.

=== Photocopy of a letter, 1983, of Patrick Leigh Fermor, to Robin McDouall, Secretary of the Travellers Club ===
This is a photocopy of a 1983 letter with its original envelope from Fermor to Robin McDouall, Secretary of the Travellers Club in London, UK. The original was sent as a Christmas letter, and contains an English translation of the German poem The Heart of Douglas by Moritz von Strachwitz. The translation was intended for an Oxford University Press book of German verse. This letter was acquired in 2018 from David Croser.

=== Postcards and letters of Joan and Patrick Leigh Fermor to Lyndall Passerini Hopkinson ===
These materials were purchased from Lyndall Passerini Hopkinson, the recipient of the letters, in 2015. There are 20 letters and postcards sent from Fermor himself to Hopkinson, dated from 1985 up until 2003. Also included here are two letters of Joan Leigh Fermor to Hopkinson, dated 1976 and 1988.
