= Mani: Travels in the Southern Peloponnese =

1958 book by Patrick Leigh Fermor

Mani
- First edition (UK)
- Author: Patrick Leigh Fermor
- Language: English
- Genre: Travel
- Publisher: John Murray
- Publication date: 1958
- Publication place: United Kingdom
- Media type: Print (hardback & paperback)
- Pages: 320

Mani: Travels in the Southern Peloponnese is a travel book by English author Patrick Leigh Fermor, published in 1958. It covers his journey with his wife Joan and friend Xan Fielding around the Mani peninsula in southern Greece.

== Travel ==
The book chronicles Leigh Fermor's travels around the Mani peninsula in southern mainland Greece. The region is typically viewed as inhospitable and isolated from much of the remainder of Greece due its harsh geography. The Taygetus mountains run down the middle of the peninsula, limiting most settlements to small villages on or near the coast. The journey begins near Kalamata, and proceeds south along the Mani coastline (mostly by boat or caique), ending in the town of Gytheon.

Leigh Fermor's book almost never mentions his travelling companions, and only rarely delves into first-person experiences. Much of the book concentrates on the history of the Maniots and of their larger place in Greek and European history; the middle portion contains lengthy digressions on art history, icons, religion, and myth in Maniot society.

His future wife Joan accompanied him on the trip and took a number of photographs for the original version of the book.

The cover of the book was designed by John Craxton.

== Reception ==
Mani is sometimes listed as a companion volume to Leigh Fermor's Roumeli: Travels in Northern Greece.

== Translation ==
The book was translated into Greek by future prime minister Tzannis Tzannetakis while he was internal exile imposed by the Greek military junta. The translation was revised after his release with Leigh Fermor, who added a further chapter on the olive harvest: this appeared in English for the first time in 2021.

== Later life ==
Patrick and Joan Leigh Fermor later settled in the Mani peninsula, living in a house near Kardamyli that the two designed and built.
