= Evrotas Valley =

Elongated valley in Greece

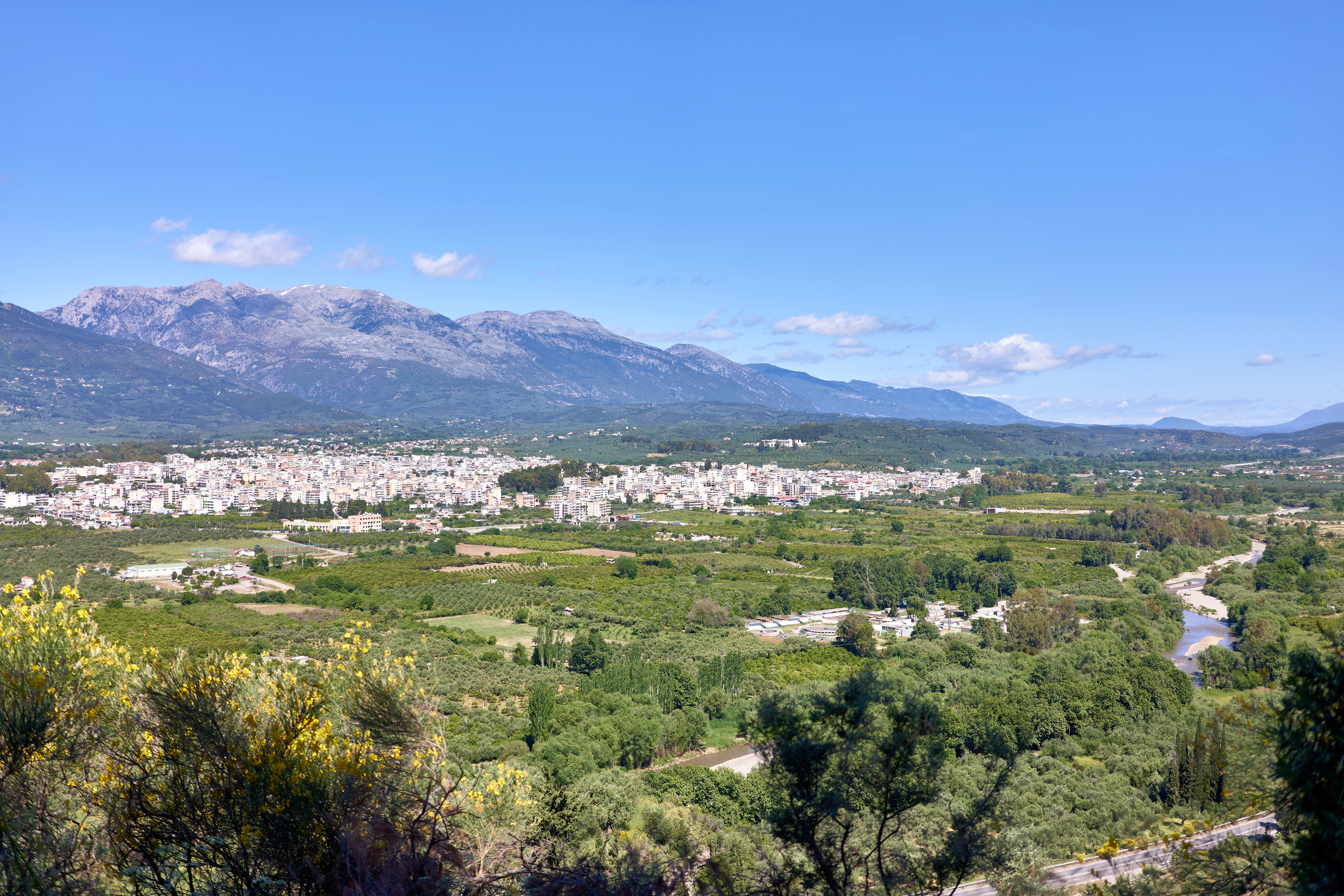
- Landscape view of the Evrotas Valley from the Menelaion.
- Floor elevation: 0–250 m (0–820 ft)
- Length: 82 km (51 mi)
- Width: 17 km (11 mi)

Geography
- Location: Laconia, Greece
- Population centers: Sparta, Mystras, Gytheio
- Coordinates: 36°48′15″N 22°41′45″E
- Rivers: Evrotas River
- Interactive map of Evrotas Valley

The Evrotas Valley is an 82 km elongated valley between Taygetus and Parnon which traverses Laconia, Greece. Homer called the valley Kili Lakedemon, while Sparta, Mystras and Gytheio are the main cities within the valley. It is one of the largest valleys in Greece. The valley is predominantly an agricultural region that contains many citrus groves, olive groves, and pasture lands. It is the location of the largest orange production in the Peloponnese and probably in all of Greece. Lakonia, a brand of orange juice, is based in Amykles. The Evrotas Valley records the highest summer mean maximum temperatures in Greece.

== Geography ==
The Evrotas River is the main river traversing the valley. The valley runs until the delta of the river in the Laconian Gulf. Modern day Sparta, the capital of the prefecture of Laconia, lies on the eastern foothills of Mount Taygetos. The city has been built upon the site of ancient Sparta, whose Acropolis lies north of the modern city.

The Taygetus Massif is about 100 km (62 mi) long, extending from the center of the Peloponnese to Cape Matapan, its southernmost extremity. It contains the tallest mountain in the Peloponnese, the Profitis Ilias summit, reaching 2,405 m (7,890 ft); this is probably the classical Mount Taléton mentioned by Pausanias. The summit is an ultra-prominent peak. It is prominent above the Isthmus of Corinth, which separating the Peloponnese from mainland Greece, rises only to approximately 60 m (200 ft). Numerous creeks wash down from the mountains and the Evrotas has some of its headwaters in the northern part of the range. The western side of the massif houses the headwaters of the Vyros Gorge, which carries winter snowmelt down the mountain, emptying into the Messenian Gulf in the town of Kardamyli. The Parnon Massif is divided into three parts. The northernmost, which is the highest, runs 30 kilometres (19 miles) from just north of Ano Doliana in North Kynouria, eastern Arcadia, southeast to Platanaki Pass. Platanaki, ancient Glyppia, is on the ancient route from Therapnes to South Kynouria between the peaks of Parnon, 1,935 metres (6,348 feet), and Psaris, 1,836 m (6,024 ft). Altitudes on the north rise from 1,100 m (3,600 ft) to 1,300 m (4,300 ft) increasing toward the peak to 1,600 m (5,200 ft) to 1,800 m (5,900 ft) with a tree line at 1,750 m (5,740 ft). Below it are forests of Black Pine and fir; above it, grasslands. Between the pass and Kounoupia to the south is 22 km (14 mi) of central Parnon, lower in altitude than the northern. The remaining 38 km (24 mi), even lower in altitude but still mountainous, runs from Kounouria to the sea at Epidaurus Limera, which is in Monemvasia. Parnon proper does not extend into the Malea Peninsula. In addition to the range of Parnon, two forelands can also be defined, east and west. Kynouria is located in the east foreland. In the west two lengths can be distinguished: from the northern flank of Parnon to Gkoritsa in Therapnes (on the road to Platanaki Pass), which is 6 km (3.7 mi) to 15 km (9.3 mi), and southward into the Malea Peninsula, 3 km (1.9 mi) to 9 km (5.6 mi) wide.

== History ==
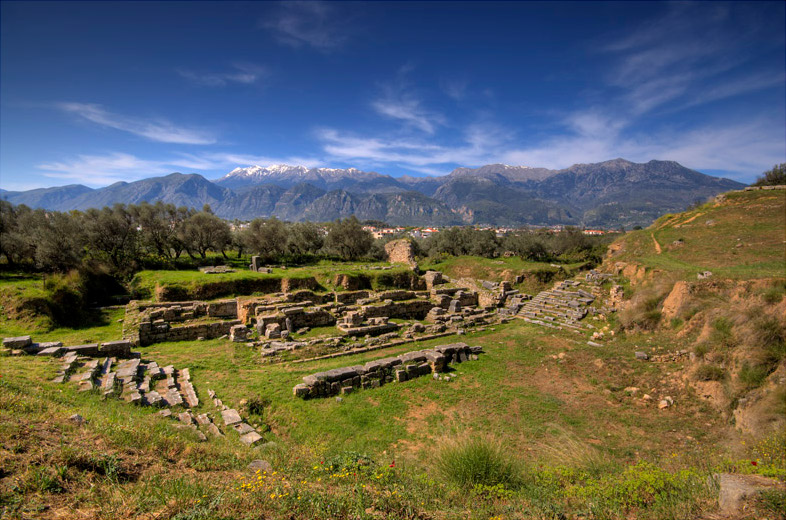
View of Ancient Sparta ruins within the valley

The history of the valley is closely linked with ancient Sparta which was built in the west bank of the Evrotas River. Beginning in the 13th century, the political and cultural center of the valley shifted to Mystras, some 4 km to the west. The settlement at ancient Sparta, named Lacedaemonia, continued to exist, although greatly depopulated, until modern times as a town of a few thousand people who lived among the ruins, in the shadow of Mystras. The Palaiologos family (the last Byzantine Greek imperial dynasty) also lived in Mystras. The Despotate of the Morea was captured by the Ottomans under Mehmed II in 1460. In 1834, after the Greek War of Independence, King Otto of Greece decreed the town should be expanded into a city.

Modern Sparta's origins date back to October 20, 1834, when King Otto issued a decree on the construction of the new city. Bavarian city planners, headed by Fr. Stauffert, designed a city of 100,000 inhabitants based on the neo-classical architectural model. Today Sparta maintains its good design, boasting large squares and wide streets lined with trees, while many of the older buildings remain in excellent condition. The city of Sparta is the economic, administrative and cultural center of Lakonia. A key factor in the advancement of the city's development is the operation of two departments of the University of Peloponnese and a department of the Technological Educational Institute.The centrally located main square is dominated by the most imposing neo-classical building in Sparta, the City Hall. Built in 1909, City Hall bears the signature of the Greek architect G. Katsaros. During the monarchy (which was abolished by referendum in 1973), the title of Duke of Sparta was used for the Greek crown prince, the διάδοχος (diádokhos).

== Climate ==
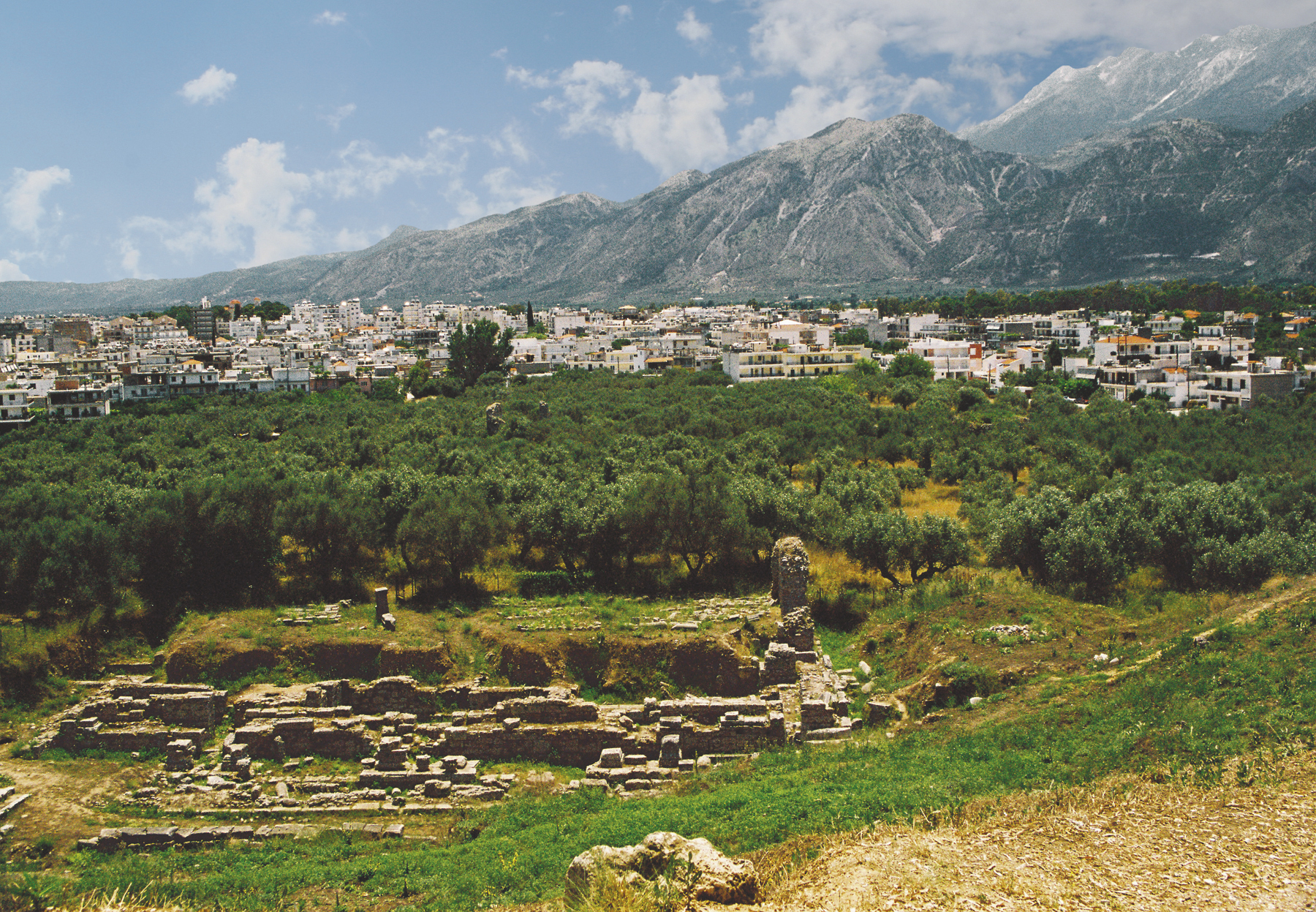
The interior of the Evrotas Valley

The Evrotas Valley enjoys a sunny and warm Mediterranean climate (Köppen: Csa). The interior of the valley records the highest summer mean maximum temperatures in Greece and is comparable to inland areas of western Andalusia in terms of summer average highs. This is due to the interior's geographical location between Taygetus and Parnon mountains, completely cut out from the sea on all directions, some 30 km away from the shores. As the meltemi winds sweep Greece during the summer, both mountains provide a constant hot foehn winds effect which strongly affects the interior of the valley.

During July 2023 the non WMO station of the National Observatory of Athens in Evrotas registered a record mean max temperature of 42.3°C. On August 3, 2021 the Evrotas station recorded 47.4°C. On average this station records 43 days annually with temperatures over 40.0°C. On July 30, 2021 the Kelefina non WMO station of the National Observatory of Athens recorded 47.1°C.

In July 2023 the World Meteorological Organization station in Gytheio registered 46.4°C which is the highest temperature ever recorded in the National Observatory of Athens fan aspirated stations network. In June 2024, Sparta recorded an astonishing mean max temperature of 37.6 °C (99.7 °F).

Climate data for Sparta 180 m a.s.l
Month	Jan	Feb	Mar	Apr	May	Jun	Jul	Aug	Sep	Oct	Nov	Dec	Year
Record high °C (°F)	23.5 (74.3)	26.4 (79.5)	27.2 (81.0)	34.1 (93.4)	40.7 (105.3)	44.4 (111.9)	44.2 (111.6)	45.7 (114.3)	40.3 (104.5)	36.4 (97.5)	30.8 (87.4)	23.5 (74.3)	45.7 (114.3)
Mean daily maximum °C (°F)	14.6 (58.3)	15.9 (60.6)	18.6 (65.5)	22.9 (73.2)	27.8 (82.0)	32.9 (91.2)	36.3 (97.3)	36.0 (96.8)	31.3 (88.3)	25.5 (77.9)	20.2 (68.4)	16.0 (60.8)	24.8 (76.7)
Daily mean °C (°F)	8.9 (48.0)	9.9 (49.8)	12.1 (53.8)	15.5 (59.9)	20.0 (68.0)	24.9 (76.8)	28.0 (82.4)	27.8 (82.0)	23.9 (75.0)	18.6 (65.5)	14.0 (57.2)	10.2 (50.4)	17.8 (64.1)
Mean daily minimum °C (°F)	3.1 (37.6)	3.9 (39.0)	5.6 (42.1)	8.1 (46.6)	12.2 (54.0)	16.9 (62.4)	19.7 (67.5)	19.7 (67.5)	16.4 (61.5)	11.7 (53.1)	7.8 (46.0)	4.4 (39.9)	10.8 (51.4)
Record low °C (°F)	−5.3 (22.5)	−4.2 (24.4)	−4.6 (23.7)	−0.7 (30.7)	6.2 (43.2)	9.4 (48.9)	14.2 (57.6)	13.1 (55.6)	9.1 (48.4)	1.5 (34.7)	−1.7 (28.9)	−5.2 (22.6)	−5.3 (22.5)
Average rainfall mm (inches)	124.6 (4.91)	80.5 (3.17)	59.9 (2.36)	32.2 (1.27)	25.1 (0.99)	32.0 (1.26)	10.4 (0.41)	19.9 (0.78)	51.2 (2.02)	59.4 (2.34)	91.9 (3.62)	97.4 (3.83)	684.5 (26.96)
Source: National Observatory of Athens (Feb 2009 - Aug 2025), Sparta N.O.A station, World Meteorological Organization

Climate data for Evrotas (National Observatory of Athens) 224 m a.s.l, (2020–2024)
Month	Jan	Feb	Mar	Apr	May	Jun	Jul	Aug	Sep	Oct	Nov	Dec	Year
Record high °C (°F)	25.4 (77.7)	28.7 (83.7)	32.5 (90.5)	36.5 (97.7)	42.8 (109.0)	46.6 (115.9)	47.0 (116.6)	47.4 (117.3)	42.1 (107.8)	39.6 (103.3)	34.5 (94.1)	27.6 (81.7)	47.4 (117.3)
Mean daily maximum °C (°F)	17.4 (63.3)	19.2 (66.6)	20.5 (68.9)	26.3 (79.3)	31.8 (89.2)	37.1 (98.8)	40.7 (105.3)	39.8 (103.6)	35.4 (95.7)	30.2 (86.4)	24.0 (75.2)	19.1 (66.4)	28.5 (83.2)
Daily mean °C (°F)	10.1 (50.2)	11.1 (52.0)	12.3 (54.1)	16.8 (62.2)	21.4 (70.5)	26.3 (79.3)	29.5 (85.1)	29.0 (84.2)	25.3 (77.5)	20.6 (69.1)	15.9 (60.6)	12.1 (53.8)	19.2 (66.6)
Mean daily minimum °C (°F)	2.8 (37.0)	2.9 (37.2)	4.1 (39.4)	7.3 (45.1)	11.0 (51.8)	15.6 (60.1)	18.3 (64.9)	18.1 (64.6)	15.1 (59.2)	11.1 (52.0)	7.7 (45.9)	5.1 (41.2)	9.9 (49.9)
Record low °C (°F)	−6.5 (20.3)	−5.1 (22.8)	−2.5 (27.5)	−1.0 (30.2)	5.8 (42.4)	9.3 (48.7)	12.7 (54.9)	15.0 (59.0)	8.0 (46.4)	5.8 (42.4)	−0.5 (31.1)	−2.6 (27.3)	−6.5 (20.3)
Average rainfall mm (inches)	101.2 (3.98)	38.2 (1.50)	56.4 (2.22)	27.8 (1.09)	21.6 (0.85)	34.9 (1.37)	10.2 (0.40)	25.1 (0.99)	39.3 (1.55)	64.6 (2.54)	98.9 (3.89)	96.3 (3.79)	614.5 (24.17)
Source 1: Hydro Meteorological station of Evrotas, National Observatory of Athens (Mar 2020 - Jul 2024)
Source 2: Precipitation from Sparta N.O.A station

=== Highest temperatures recorded ===
Below a list of the highest temperatures ever recorded in the Evrotas Valley. The Evrotas and Kelefina stations are non WMO stations.

Temperature	Location	Date Recorded
47.4 °C (117.3 °F)	Evrotas	August 3, 2021
47.1 °C (116.8 °F)	Kelefina	July 30, 2021
47.0 °C (116.6 °F)	Evrotas	July 22, 2023
46.6 °C (115.9 °F)	Evrotas	June 12, 2024
46.4 °C (115.5 °F)	Gytheio	July 23, 2023
46.3 °C (115.3 °F)	Evrotas	August 2, 2021
46.3 °C (115.3 °F)	Evrotas	August 4, 2021
46.2 °C (115.2 °F)	Evrotas	July 23, 2023
46.0 °C (114.8 °F)	Sparta	August 24, 1924
45.9 °C (114.6 °F)	Evrotas	July 26, 2023

== Ecosystem ==
The past few years the river has been littered with garbage while problems with animal overeating is affecting the valley. In January 2011 thousands of fish were found dead at the banks of the Evrotas River.
