= Ben Downing =

Ben Downing may refer to:

- Ben Downing (writer) (born 1967), American author
- Benjamin Downing (born 1981), known as Ben, American politician
