= Mary Berry bibliography =

Mary Berry is a British food writer, best known for her work with AGA cooking and for baking. The Hamlyn All Colour Cookbook was her first published cook book, in which she collaborated with Ann Body and Audrey Ellis. She has since gone on to write over seventy cook books, which have sold over five million copies.

== Books ==
| Name | Publisher | Publication date | Notes | Ref(s) |
|---|---|---|---|---|
| Mary Berry's Cook Book | Cassell | 1 Feb 1970 | | |
| The Hamlyn All Colour Cook Book | Hamlyn | 31 Jul 1970 | Co-written with Ann Body and Audrey Ellis | |
| Popular Freezer Cookery | Treasury Press | 1 Jan 1972 | | |
| Popular French Cookery | Octopus Books | 29 Sep 1972 | | |
| Good Afternoon Cookbook | Sphere Books | 22 Jul 1976 | | |
| Cider For All Seasons | H.P. Bulmer Ltd | 1 Nov 1977 | | |
| Colour Book of Freezer Cookery | | 22 Jul 1977 | | |
| One Pot Cooking | Hamlyn | 1 Apr 1978 | | |
| Mary Berry's Family Recipes | Macdonald Educational | 26 Apr 1979 | Co-authored with Linda Sonntag | |
| Television Cook Book | Macdonald Educational | 1 Oct 1979 | Book tie-in with her television show on Thames Television | |
| Glorious Puds | Dent | 7 Feb 1980 | | |
| Mary Berry's Home Cooking | Macdonald Educational | 1 Sep 1980 | | |
| Cooking with Cheese | Batsford | 25 Sep 1980 | | |
| Fast Cakes | Piatkus Books | 1981 | Republished Sphere Books; New Ed edition (1983), still on sale with new cover. Also hardback | |
| Day by Day Cooking | Hamlyn | 1977 | | |
| Mary Berry's Main Course | Batsford | 1 Jun 1981 | | |
| New Book of Meat Cookery | Queen Anne Press | 1 Oct 1981 | | |
| Recipes from Home and Abroad | Black Cat | 1 Oct 1981 | | |
| Fruit Fare | Piatkus Books | 1 Mar 1982 | | |
| Mary Berry's Country Cooking | Thames Macdonald | 23 Sep 1982 | | |
| The Perfect Sunday Lunch | Century | 11 Nov 1982 | | |
| Crockery Cookery | WH Smith Publishing | 1 Jan 1983 | | |
| Cooking at Home | Thames Macdonald | 18 Aug 1983 | | |
| Food as Presents | Little, Brown Book Group | 1 Sep 1983 | | |
| Mary Berry's Complete Television Cook Book | Macdonald & Co | 1 Sep 1983 | | |
| Fast Deserts | Piatkus Books | 1 Oct 1983 | | |
| Family Cooking | Thames Macdonald | 1 Mar 1984 | | |
| Iceland Guide to Cooking from Your Freezer | Martin Books | 8 Feb 1985 | | |
| Mary Berry's Kitchen Wisdom | Piatkus Books | 1 Apr 1985 | | |
| Feed Your Family the Healthier Way | Piatkus Books | 1 Jul 1985 | | |
| New Freezer Cook Book | Sphere Books | 18 Jul 1985 | | |
| Cooking for Celebrations | Macdonald & Co | 5 Jun 1986 | | |
| More Fast Cakes | Time Warner Paperbacks | 1988 | New Ed edition publication date given | |
| Mary Berry's Desserts and Confections | Dorling Kindersley | 1991 | Reissued in 2011, titled Desserts | |
| Mary Berry's Ultimate Cake Book | BBC Books | 13 Oct 1994 | | |
| Mary Berry's Complete Cook Book | Dorling Kindersley | 1995 | | |
| Mary Berry: At Home | BBC Books | 17 Oct 1996 | | |
| The New Cook | Dorling Kindersley | 1997 | Co-written with Marlena Spieler; ISBN 0-7894-1996-3 | |
| Cook Now Eat Later | | 1 Sep 2002 | | |
| Mary Berry's Christmas Collection | Headline | 1 Oct 2006 | | |
| Real Food Fast | | 1 Oct 2007 | | |
| Mary Berry's Kitchen Favourites | Dorling Kindersley | 7 Jun 2007 | | |
| Mary Berry's Stress-free Kitchen | | 18 Sep 2008 | | |
| Mary Berry's Supper for Friends | | 2 Mar 2009 | | |
| Mary Berry's Baking Bible | BBC Books | 3 Sep 2009 | | |
| My Kitchen Table: 100 Cakes & Bakes | BBC Books | 6 Jan 2011 | | |
| Mary Berry's How To Cook: Easy Recipes and Foolproof Techniques | Dorling Kindersley | 1 Jul 2011 | | |
| Mary Berry's Family Sunday Lunches | | 1 Sep 2011 | | |
| My Kitchen Table: 100 Sweet Treats and Puds | BBC Books | 15 Sep 2011 | | |
| Complete Cookbook (2012 edition revised and updated) | Dorling Kindersley | 1 Feb 2012 | | |
| One Step Ahead | | 2 Aug 2012 | | |
| Mary Berry: At Home | BBC Books | 1 Feb 2013 | Co-written with Lucy Young | |
| Mary Berry's Cookery Course | Dorling Kindersley | 30 May 2013 | | |
| Mary Berry: The Autobiography: Recipe for Life | | 12 Sep 2013 | | |
| Mary Berry: A Recipe For Life - Autobiography | | 2013 | | |
| Cook Up A Feast | Dorling Kindersley | 3 Feb 2014 | Co-written with Lucy Young | |
| Mary Berry's Simple Cakes | BBC Books | 17 Jul 2014 | | |
| Mary Berry: Mary Berry Cooks | BBC Books | 27 Feb 2014 | | |
| Mary Berry: Cooks the Perfect | | 1 Sep 2014 | | |
| Mary Berry's Absolute Favourites | BBC Books | 2015 | | |
| Baking with Mary Berry | Dorling Kindersley | 17 Nov 2015 | | |
| The Complete Aga Cookbook | Headline | 24 Sep 2015 | | |
| Mary Berry: Foolproof Cooking | BBC Books | 28 Jan 2016 | Co-written with Lucy Young, Book tie-in with her television show on BBC2 | |
| Mary Berry: Everyday | BBC Books | 26 Jan 2017 | Book tie-in with her television show on BBC2 | |
| Mary Berry's Complete Cookbook (2017 Edition or reprint of 2012 later reprinted with new DK logo) | Dorling Kindersley | 4 Sep 2017 | | |
| Mary Berry’s Quick Cooking | BBC Books | 21 Feb 2019 | Book tie-in with her television show on BBC2 | |
| Mary Berry Cooks Up a Feast | Dorling Kindersley | 3 Oct 2019 | Co-written with Lucy Young | |
| Mary Berry's Simple Comforts | BBC Books | 17 Sep 2020 | Book tie-in with her television show on BBC2 | |
| Mary Berry Cooks to Perfection | Dorling Kindersley | 3 Mar 2021 | | |
| Love to Cook | BBC Books | 28 Oct 2021 | Book tie-in with her television show on BBC2 | |
| Cook and Share | Ebury Publishing | 1 Sep 2022 | Book tie-in with her television show on BBC2 | |
| Mary Berry's Baking Bible (2023 Edition, Revised and updated) | Ebury Publishing | 2 Mar 2023 | | |
| Mary Makes it Easy | Ebury Publishing | 12 Oct 2023 | Book tie-in with her television show on BBC2 | |
| Mary Berry's Christmas Collection | Headline | 9 Nov 2023 | | |
| Mary Berry's Complete Cookbook (2024 Edition) | Dorling Kindersley | 22 Feb 2024 | | |
| Mary’s Foolproof Dinners | BBC Books | 10 Oct 2024 | Book tie-in with her television show on BBC2 | |
| Mary Berry's Complete Cookbook (2025 Edition) | Dorling Kindersley | | | |
| Mary 90: My Very Best Recipes | BBC Books | 9 Oct 2025 | Book tie-in with her television show on BBC2 | |
| My Gardening Life | Dorling Kindersley | 26 Feb 2026 | Gardening book | |
| Mary All in One | Ebury Publishing | 8 October 2026 | Cookbook | |
