= Viros =

Viros or Vyros may refer to:

- Vyros Gorge, a gorge in the Peloponnese, Greece
- Viros, Greece, a village in the municipal unit Achilleio, Corfu, Greece

VIROS may refer to:

- VIRtual memory Operating System, the TOPS-20 first in-house code name
