= Evrotas =

Evrotas may refer to:

- Evrotas (river), a river in the Peloponnese, Greece
- Evrotas (municipality), a municipality in Laconia, Greece
- Evrotas Valley, a valley in the Peloponnese, Greece
