= Taygetus =

Mountain range in Southern Greece

Mount Taygetus
- Ταΰγετος; Profitis Ilias (HP)
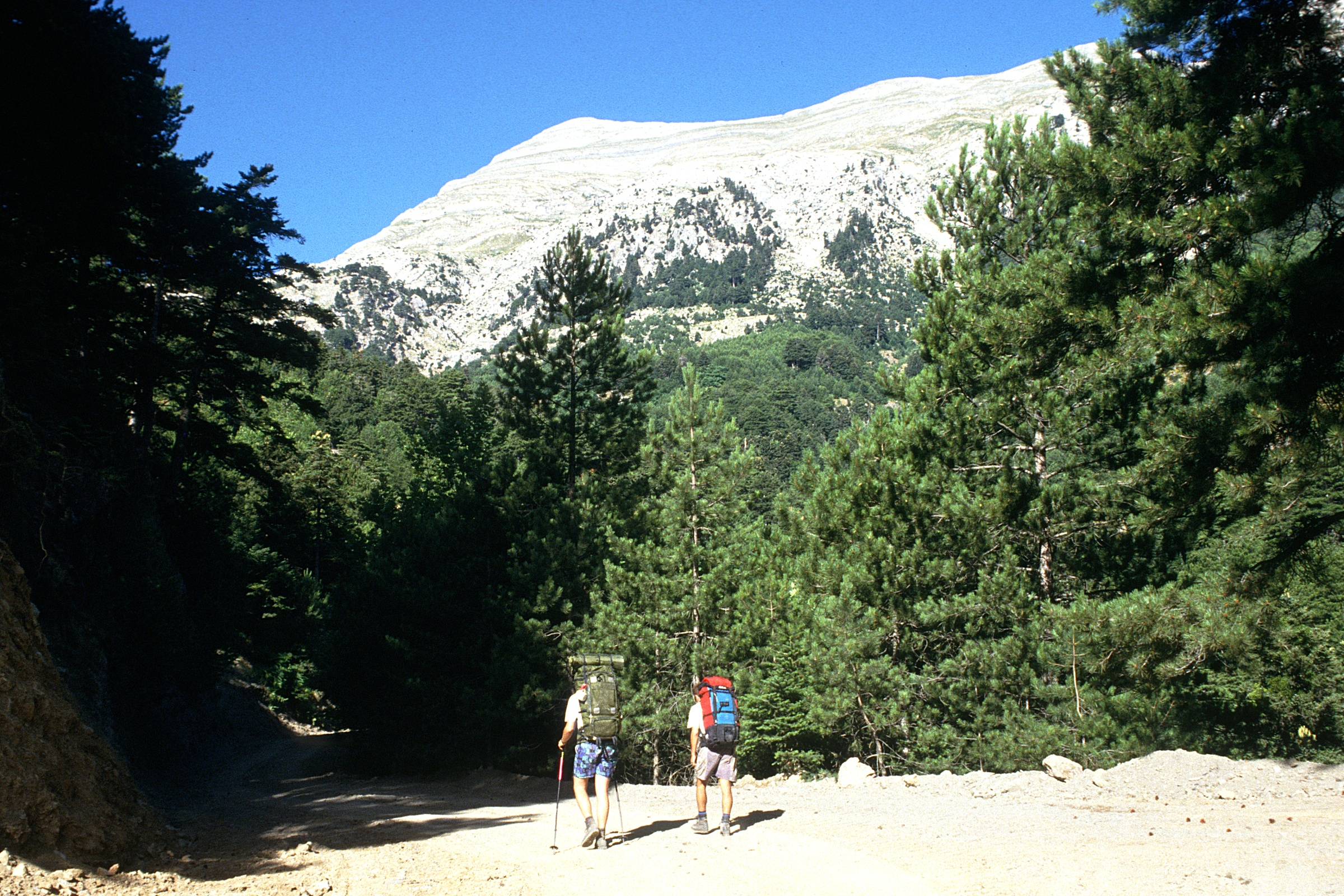

Highest point
- Elevation: 2,405 m (7,890 ft)
- Prominence: 2,344 m (7,690 ft)
- Listing: Ultra
- Coordinates: 36°57′14″N 22°21′08″E

Geography
- Location within Greece
- Location: Peloponnese, Greece

Climbing
- Easiest route: Hike, some rock scrambling

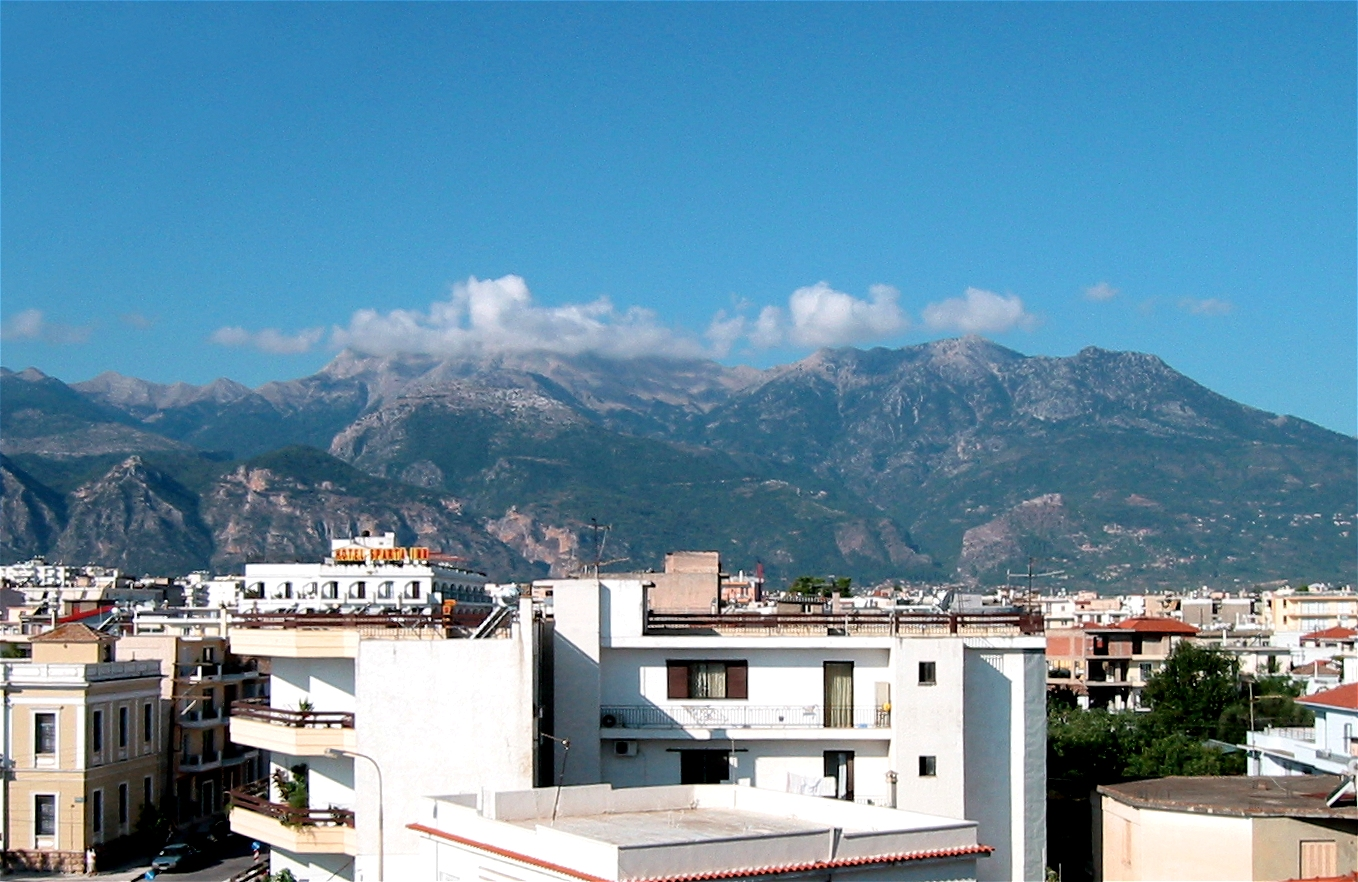
Mount Taygetus seen from Sparta, located on the east side of the Eurotas rift valley. The fault scarps marking the strike of the Sparta Fault are visible on the eastern face of the mountain.

The Taygetus, Taugetus, Taygetos or Taÿgetus (Greek: Ταΰγετος, romanized: Taygetos) is a mountain range on the Peloponnese peninsula in Southern Greece. The highest mountain of the range is Mount Taygetus, also known as "Profitis Ilias", or "Prophet Elias" (Elijah).

The name is one of the oldest recorded in Europe, appearing in the Odyssey. In classical mythology, it was associated to the nymph Taygete and it was named after her. During Byzantine times and up until the 19th century, the mountain was also known as Pentadaktylos (Πενταδάκτυλος; Greek for five-fingered, a common name during that period).

== Geography ==
=== Physical ===
The Taygetus Massif is about 100 km (62 mi) long, extending from the center of the Peloponnese to Cape Matapan, its southernmost extremity. It contains the tallest mountain in the Peloponnese, the Profitis Ilias summit, reaching 2,405 m (7,890 ft); this is probably the classical Mount Taléton mentioned by Pausanias. The summit is an ultra-prominent peak. It is prominent above the Isthmus of Corinth, which separating the Peloponnese from mainland Greece, rises only to approximately 60 m (200 ft). Numerous creeks wash down from the mountains and the Eurotas has some of its headwaters in the northern part of the range. The western side of the massif houses the headwaters of the Vyros Gorge, which carries winter snowmelt down the mountain, emptying into the Messenian Gulf in the town of Kardamyli.

=== Political ===
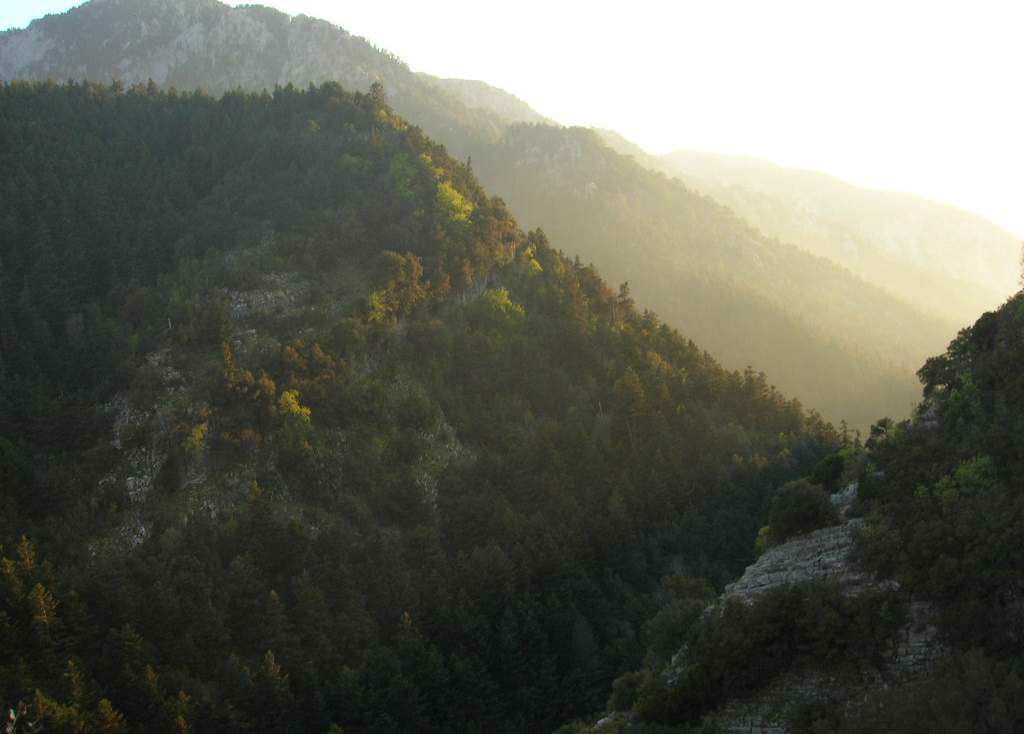
Part of Skoteini Plevra, showing the dark side

Taygetus overlooks the cities of Sparta and Kalamata, whose skyline it dominates. The mountain range lies within the prefectures of Arcadia, Laconia and Messenia. Taygetus is crossed by Greek National Road 82, which links Kalamata to Sparta and separates Northern Taygetus from the Central Range. The Rindomo Gorge separates the Central Range from Southern Taygetos. The section of Taygetus that forms the backbone of the Mani Peninsula is also known as Saggias, and is often not considered part of Taygetus. The central part of the mountain range is commonly called "Skoteini Plevra", which means "the dark side" because the villages located there do not receive as much sunshine in the early morning and the late afternoon hours.

== Geology ==
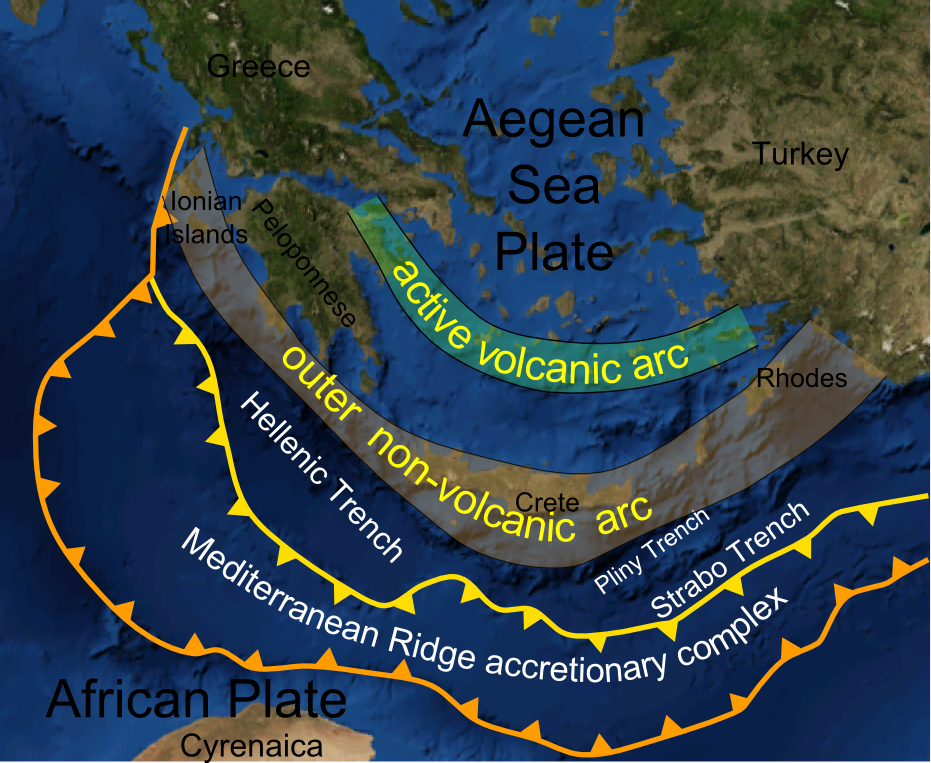
Hellenic arc, a subduction zone. The arrows give the direction of plate movement. The southernmost part of the arc is moving north east, to be subducted under the Hellenic plate. The plate itself is extending southwest into the subduction zone, generating a fault-block topography.

The mountains of southern Europe that fringe the Mediterranean Sea and run generally in an east-west direction are of the folded type generated by collision of the northward-moving African Plate with the Eurasian Plate. Where the northern edge of the African Plate is being subducted in an irregular line a second orogeny occurs that is not entirely understood. The mountains of Italy and Greece are a combination of folded mountains and fault-block mountains running in a northwest–southeast direction.

The Hellenic Subduction carries the leading edge of the African Plate under the Aegean Sea Plate at the Hellenic Trench. It follows an arc around the outer edge of the Peloponnese and Crete. The subduction on the west is to the northeast, on the east to the northwest, and north in the center. The average direction is N 21° E. In the islands and southern Greece a fault-block mountain orogeny prevails due to a double set of crustal movements. On the one hand the Aegean Sea Plate is being raised by the subduction. On the other hand, north–south extensional movements, yet unexplained, are pulling the plate apart, creating normal extensional faults and generating a parallel sequence of horsts and grabens, or rift valleys, running in a north–south direction.

Mount Taygetus is a limestone horst bordering the Eurotas Rift Valley. Below its eastern face is the Sparta fault, a normal fault striking perpendicular to the direction of extension. Footwall scarps are visible on the eastern side of Taygetus at the base of its spurs. They result from sudden slippages of the hanging wall in the direction of the dip, causing earthquakes. Single earthquakes result in 1–12 m of scarp. The Sparta fault is zig-zag in strike, varying between N 170° E and N 140° E. The maximum slippage has been 10–12 m in three increments. The earthquake of 464 BC, which levelled Sparta, resulted from a slippage of 3–4 m over a length of 20 km of the fault. The slip rate has been about 1 mm per year suggesting an average interval between earthquakes of 3000 years.

== Ecology ==
The slopes of Taygetus are heavily forested, primarily with Greek fir (Abies cephalonica) and black pine (Pinus nigra). Devastating fires in 2005 and 2007 consumed much of the forests on the central west slopes, and only about half remain.

== History ==
The slopes of Taygetus have been inhabited since at least Mycenean times. The site of Arkina, near the village of Arna, contains three beehive tombs and is still unexplored. Taygetus was important as one of Sparta's natural defenses. The Spartans threw criminals into a chasm of Taygetus known as Ceadas or Caeadas (Greek: Καιάδας and Κεάδας). Recent evidence, found by the University of Athens, discovered remains of adult individuals which appeared to confirm that Ceadas was mainly a place of punishment for criminals, traitors and captives.

According to an Open University online course, "The first century CE writer Plutarch explains that Sparta had a ritual by which newborn babies were judged by the elders and those thought unfit to be allowed to live were left at the foot of Mount Taygetos. However, no other source tells us this about Spartan practices, and no infant remains have been found at this site." While bones have been found at the site, a study determined they all belonged to adolescents and adults.

At the ancient period, on spring women tied around their necks a plant which was growing on the mountain and was called Charisia. This way they wanted to make themselves more passionately beloved by men.

During the era of barbarian invasions, Taygetus served as a shelter for the native population. Many of the villages in its slopes date from this period. In Medieval times, the citadel and monastery of Mystras was built on the steep slopes, and became a center of Byzantine civilization and served as the capital of the Despotate of the Morea. Mystras remains occupied by a tiny religious community. The buildings are remarkably well-preserved and a major tourist attraction in the region. It is a UNESCO World Heritage Site.

== Religion ==
The peak known as Taleton, above Bryseae, was 'dedicated' to Helios, the Sun, to whom horses were sacrificed. Taleton was also 'dedicated' to Zeus. Today, the mountain is closely associated with the holy Prophet Elias, and every year on the 20th of July (the Greek Orthodox feast day for the Prophet Elias), the small chapel at the peak holds a large festival, including a massive bonfire in commemoration of the Prophet Elias (a Greek-style transliteration of 'Eliyah' (אליה), the prophet Elijah), as he is believed to have ascended up into heaven in a chariot of fire. The bonfire can be seen from anywhere with clear view of the summit, and it is for this reason that the town of Kardamyli is a local gathering point for those who wish to view the fire without having to climb the mountain.

== Recreation ==
The highest point, Profitis Ilias, is a popular hiking destination and European walking route E4 runs along the lower slopes of the range. The view from the Profitis Ilias includes most of the Evrotas Valley and the Parnon range to the east, while the view towards the west includes Kalamata and the eastern half of Messenia. Most of the southwestern part of Arcadia can also be seen.

== See also ==
- List of mountains in Greece

== Bibliography ==
- Armijo, R.; Lyon-Caen, H.; Papanastassiou, D. (June 1992). "East-west extension and Holocene normal-fault scarps in the Hellenic arc" (PDF). Geology. 20 (6): 491–494. Bibcode:1992Geo....20..491A. doi:10.1130/0091-7613(1992)020<0491:eweahn>2.3.co;2.
