= Queen Anne Press =

Publisher of Ian Fleming's literary estate

- Founded: 1951
- Founder: Lord Kemsley
- Headquarters: United Kingdom
- Products: Books

The Queen Anne Press (logo stylized QAP) is a small publisher (originally a private press).

== History ==
It was created in 1951 by Lord Kemsley, proprietor of The Sunday Times, to publish the works of contemporary authors. In 1952, as a wedding present to his then Foreign Editor, Kemsley made Ian Fleming its managing director. The press began by concentrating on limited editions. Lycett states that under Fleming's management, the company was modelled on the Black Sun Press, run by the poet Harry Crosby, nephew of financier J. P. Morgan, although it owed more to Kemsley's other private press, the Dropmore Press, with which it shared printing equipment, and books from the two were very alike in the period between 1951 and 1955.

Director Ann Fleming, the socialite wife of Ian Fleming (and a long-time correspondent of Evelyn Waugh), requested support for the press from her literary friends, who included Noël Coward, Nancy Mitford and Stephen Spender. She asked Waugh in particular "please write me ten thousand words on some saint with interesting habits". Waugh proposed to collect a few robust reviews under the title Offensive Matter. This was shelved, however, in favour of an illustrated book The Holy Places, which had previously only been published in periodical form. The book, with wood-engravings by Reynolds Stone (a protégé of John Betjeman, according to Waugh, who did not like the book nor its illustrations), was ready in time for Christmas, 1952.

In the early years, the press also published works by other highly respected authors including travel writer Patrick Leigh Fermor and the essayist Cyril Connolly, whose book The Missing Diplomats, a scoop on the Cambridge Spy Ring, was a popular work, prompting Ann to write "business is flourishing" A possible purchase of the press by Ian and Ann Fleming was considered in 1954–5, but although a price was discussed it appears the sale never came to fruition. In 1955 or 1956 the printing equipment was sold, and the Queen Anne Press became a publishing imprint only. Fleming remained at the helm until his death in 1964, and the imprint was subsequently absorbed by the publishing interests of Robert Maxwell, becoming an imprint specialising in sporting books. In 2007 the Queen Anne Press was acquired by Ian Fleming's literary estate.

Queen Anne Press also published the journal The Book Collector (formerly Book Handbook), whose editorial board consisted of bibliophiles Michael Sadleir, John Hayward, John Carter, Percy Muir and Ian Fleming. The Queen Anne Press has also published the sporting annuals Wisden Cricketers' Almanack, Rothmans Football Yearbook and Rothmans Snooker Yearbook.

== Since 2008 ==
Inspired by the centenary of Ian Fleming in 2008, the Queen Anne Press published a limited edition of his complete works, including a new collection entitled Talk of the Devil; a posthumous volume of rarely seen material, some of it unpublished; the title was taken from a list that Fleming kept in his notebook. Further limited editions have been published under the Queen Anne Press imprint, including Ian Fleming: The Bibliography (2012) by Jon Gilbert, winner of the 16th ILAB Breslauer Prize for Bibliography.

== Selected publications ==
- Evelyn Waugh.The Holy Places With Wood Engravings by Reynolds Stone (1952). Limited to 950 copies (50 were specially bound in leather and signed by both author and illustrator). There was a revised second impression in 1953, limited to 1000 copies (again with 50 copies specially bound and signed by Waugh).
- T. S. Eliot. A Presidential Address to the Members of the London Library (1952).
- Cyril Connolly. The Missing Diplomats (1952). Introduced by Peter Quennell, the book concerns Guy Burgess, Donald MacLean and the infamous Cambridge Spy Ring.
- Patrick Leigh Fermor. A Time to Keep Silence (1953) Limited edition of 500 copies.
- John Carter. The A.E Housman Manuscripts (1956).
- Enoch Powell. Great Parliamentary Occasions (1960).
- Serge Lemoine & Grania Forbes. The Sporting Royal Family (1962).
- Dudley Noble. Milestones in a Motoring Life (1969).
- Dr. T. F. Gaskell. Using the Oceans (1970).
- Ken Rosewall. Play Tennis with Rosewall (1975).
- Denis Law. Denis Law; An Autobiography (1979).
- Alan Minter. Minter: An Autobiography (1980).
- George Best. Where Do I Go From Here; An Autobiography (1981).
- Tony Jacklin. The First Forty Years (1985).
- Mark Lawrenson. The Autobiography. With a foreword by Bob Paisley (1988).
- Sir Don Bradman.The Bradman Albums (1988).
- Jimmy White. Snooker Masterclass (1988).
- John Ireland. Racing Characters (1988).
- Ray French. 100 Greatest Rugby League Players (1989).
- Peter Alliss. 100 Greatest Golfers (1989).
- Henry Cooper. 100 Greatest Boxers (1990).
- David Campese. On A Wing and a Prayer (1991).
- Kevin Keegan. The Seventies Revisited, with Norman Giller (1994).
- Reg Gutteridge, with Norman Giller. Mike Tyson: The Release of Power (1996).
