= A Time to Keep Silence =

1953 book by Patrick Leigh Fermor

- First limited edition
- Author: Patrick Leigh Fermor
- Language: English
- Publication date: 1953

A Time to Keep Silence (1953) is a travel book by British author Patrick Leigh Fermor. It describes Fermor's sojourns in monasteries across Europe, and is praised by William Dalrymple as a "sublime masterpiece".

This was an early publication from the Queen Anne Press, a small private press, created in 1951 by Lord Kemsley, proprietor of the Sunday Times. In 1952 Kemsley made Leigh Fermor's friend Ian Fleming its managing director. The press concentrated on producing finely printed and bound editions, often with small limitations. A Time to Keep Silence was printed in a limited edition of 500 copies with illustrations by John Craxton.

After revision, an open edition was published by John Murray in 1957. This was republished by Penguin in 1988 with a new foreword written in 1982.

The monasteries discussed include the Abbey of Saint Wandrille, Solesmes Abbey and La Grande Trappe. He also describes a visit to the abandoned rock monasteries of Cappadocia near Urgub. At St Wandrille he initially experienced a strong sense of depression, restlessness, insomnia and loneliness but this 'miserable bridge-passage' cleared after a few days. He grew to admire the scholarship and learning of the Benedictine Order there and benefited from the rhythm of the daily cycle. In contrast, he found the life at the Trappist monastery incomprehensibly austere. He concludes the essay with a brief overview of English monasticism.

The title is from the Book of Ecclesiastes (Ecclesiastes 3:7).
