= Joan Leigh Fermor =

English photographer (1912–2003)

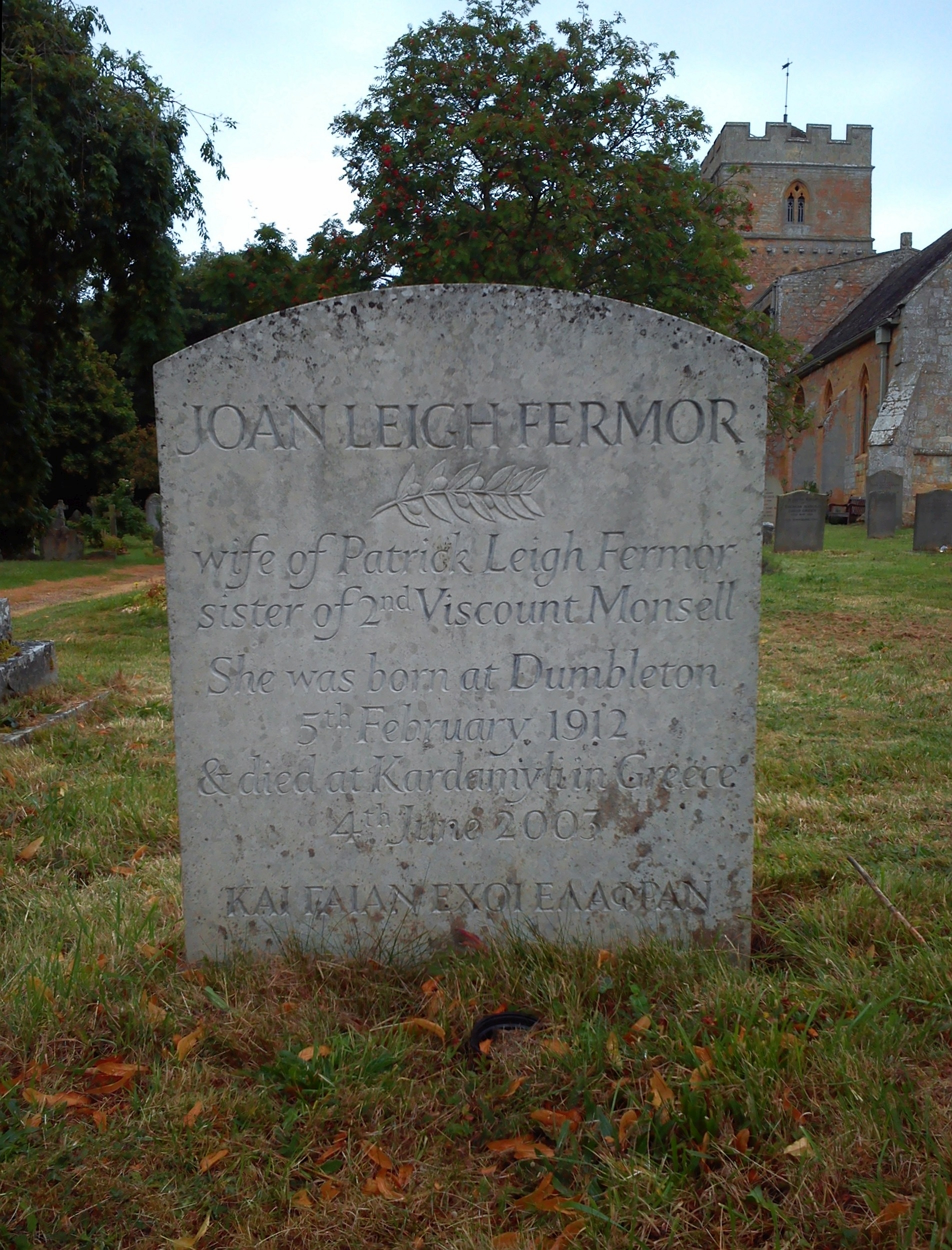
Grave of Joan Leigh Fermor, in the churchyard of St Peter's church, Dumbleton

Joan Elizabeth Eyres Monsell, formerly Rayner (5 February 1912 – 4 June 2003) was an English photographer and wife of author Sir Patrick Leigh Fermor.

== Early life ==
She was born Joan Elizabeth Eyres Monsell in Dumbleton, Gloucestershire, the second of three daughters of Bolton Eyres Monsell and his wife Sybil (née Eyres). Her father was Conservative Member of Parliament for Evesham from 1910 to 1935. He served as Conservative Chief Whip from 1923 to 1929, and First Lord of the Admiralty from 1931 to 1936. He became Viscount Monsell in 1935. Her brother Graham inherited the viscountcy on her father's death in 1969. Her family home was Dumbleton Hall in Gloucestershire, inherited by her mother. She was educated at St James's School in Malvern and before travelling in Europe, attended finishing schools in Paris and Florence

She dabbled with several possible careers. She was a talented photographer of landscapes and architecture, with pictures published in Architectural Review and Horizon. She married John Rayner, features editor of the Daily Express, in 1939.

== Second World War ==
During the Second World War, she was commissioned to photograph buildings that were likely to be bombed. She also worked as a nurse at the start of the war, but then trained in encryption, and worked in the British embassies in Madrid and Algiers before being posted to Cairo, where she first met her future husband Patrick Leigh Fermor in 1944. He was then an SOE officer famed for his part in the kidnapping of General Kreipe from Crete. Joan and he quickly fell in love, although she was still married to Rayner. Her marriage to Rayner was dissolved in 1947. She and Leigh Fermor remained close companions (although not exclusively) and were married in 1968, by which time he had published several books. Her private income allowed him to concentrate on his writing.

== With Patrick in Greece ==
Joan had joined Leigh Fermor in Athens in 1946, where he was deputy director of the British Council's Institute, and joined him on a lecture tour of Greece. She was also secretary to the cartoonist Osbert Lancaster. She travelled in France with Cyril Connolly in 1948, taking photographs to accompany a guidebook that was never finished; Connolly later said that he was distracted by her beauty. Connolly described her in 1949 as "very beautiful: tall, fair, slanting eyes, yellow skin".

She accompanied Patrick to the Caribbean after he was invited to write text for a travel book to accompany images by a Greek artist named Costas, published as The Traveller's Tree in 1950. She also accompanied Patrick on visits to remote parts of Greece that were published in his book in Mani (1958) about southern Greece and Roumeli (1966) about central Greece, accompanied in the original editions by her photographs.

Joan and Patrick lived together in a house designed and built by Patrick in an olive grove on a cliff top at Kardamyli, on the Mani Peninsula, the central peninsula of the three which extend southwards from the Peloponnese. Their circle of friends included Alberto Giacometti, Francis Bacon, Lawrence Durrell, Stephen Spender, Giorgos Seferis, Nikos Hadjikyriakos-Ghikas and many others.

She loved cats and enjoyed playing chess. After suffering a fall, she died in Mani at age 91, and was buried in Dumbleton, where Patrick joined her after his death in 2011. They had no children.

A biography by Simon Fenwick, Joan, was published in 2017.

Exhibitions: 2018 Benaki Museum, Athens Greece. https://www.benaki.gr/index.php?option=com_events&view=event&id=5601&lang=en
