= Ben Downing (writer) =

American writer, editor, and teacher

Ben Downing (born April 17, 1967) is an American writer, editor, and teacher. Specializing in nineteenth- and twentieth-century British social life and literature (with a particular emphasis on travel writing), he has written essays, articles, and reviews on figures such as Robert Louis Stevenson, Duff Cooper, Robert Byron, Anthony Powell, Peter Fleming, Wilfred Thesiger, and Patrick Leigh Fermor. His biography of Janet Ross, who for many years was the doyenne of Florence's Anglo-American colony, was published in 2013 by Farrar, Straus and Giroux.

Downing also writes poetry. His collection The Calligraphy Shop appeared in 2003, and he continues to publish poems in The Atlantic, The New Criterion, The Yale Review, and elsewhere.

Since 1993 Downing has worked at Parnassus: Poetry in Review, of which he is currently the co-editor. He has taught literary seminars and workshops at Columbia, Bryn Mawr, and the 92nd St. Y, and he currently teaches a small private class, known as The English Salon, for advanced non-native speakers of English. He lives in New York City and graduated from Harvard University.

== Works ==
=== Books ===
- Queen Bee of Tuscany: The Redoubtable Janet Ross (Farrar, Straus and Giroux, 2013), biography
- The Calligraphy Shop (Zoo Press, 2003), poetry

=== Poems ===
- "Umbrage" in The Atlantic
- "Calle Plácida Luz de la Luna" in The Atlantic
- "Inshallah" in The Atlantic
- "Domestic Cappadocia" in The New Criterion

=== Articles ===
- "A Visit with Patrick Leigh Fermor" in The Paris Review
- "Philhellene's Progress: Patrick Leigh Fermor" in The New Criterion
- "John Addington Symonds & Janet Ross: A Friendship" in The New Criterion
- "I.M. Shusha Guppy, 1935-2008" in The New Criterion
- "Peter Fleming at 100" in The New Criterion
- "In the Empty Quarter" in The New Criterion
- "Duff Cooper's Game Book" in The New Criterion
- "In Memoriam: Louis Auchincloss (1917–2010)" in The New Criterion
- "One Gentleman of Verona" in The Wall Street Journal
- "Mum's the Word" in The Wall Street Journal
- "A Troubadour on the Moors" in The Wall Street Journal
- "Love's Pestilence" in The New York Times Book Review
- "Modern Homer Unmasked as a Mythical Figure" in The Guardian
