= Vyros Gorge =

Canyon in southern Greece

Coordinates: 36.9255°N 22.2966°E

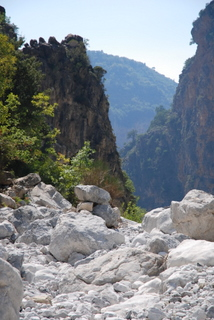

The Vyros Gorge (Greek: Φαράγγι του Βυρού) is a deep river gorge in the Taygetus Mountains on the Mani Peninsula in the Peloponnese in southern Greece. The gorge runs from the foot of Mount Taygetus (known locally as "Profitis Ilias") to the town of Kardamyli on the Messenian Gulf. In summer it remains dry but can flood spectacularly in the winter, turning into a river and transporting tree branches and rocks to its mouth in Kardamyli.

Vyros Gorge has several walking paths which lead to nearby monasteries.
