= Kardamyli =

Village in Messenia, Greece

Kardamyli Καρδαμύλη
- Community
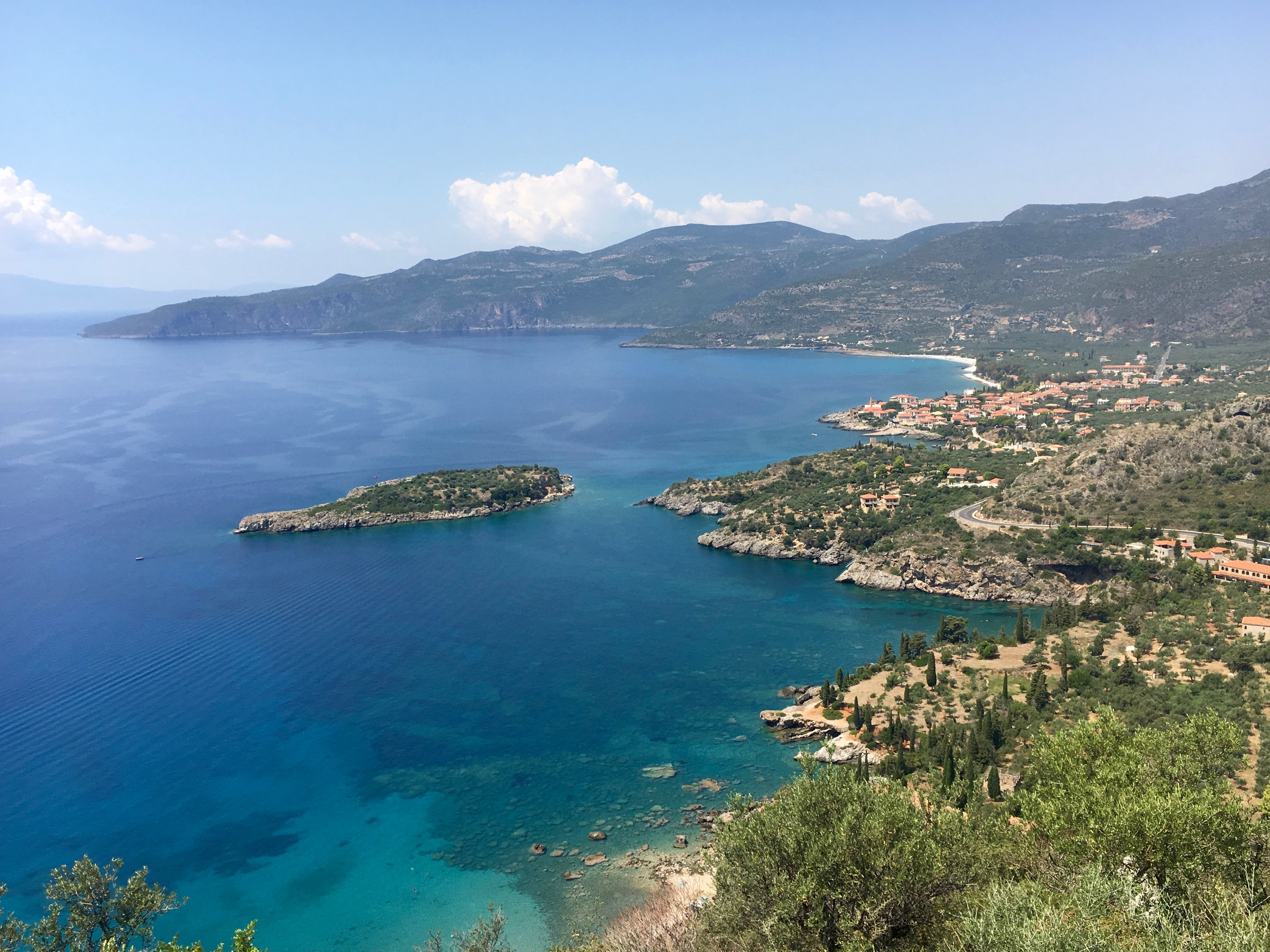
- View of Kardamyli and surrounding areas from atop a cliff to the South

- Location within Greece
- Coordinates: 36°53′N 22°14′E
- Country: Greece
- Administrative region: Peloponnese
- Regional unit: Messenia
- Municipality: West Mani
- Municipal unit: Lefktro
- Elevation: 21 m (69 ft)

Population (2021)
  - Community: 391
- Time zone: UTC+2 (EET)
  - Summer (DST): UTC+3 (EEST)
- Postal code: 24022
- Area code: 2721

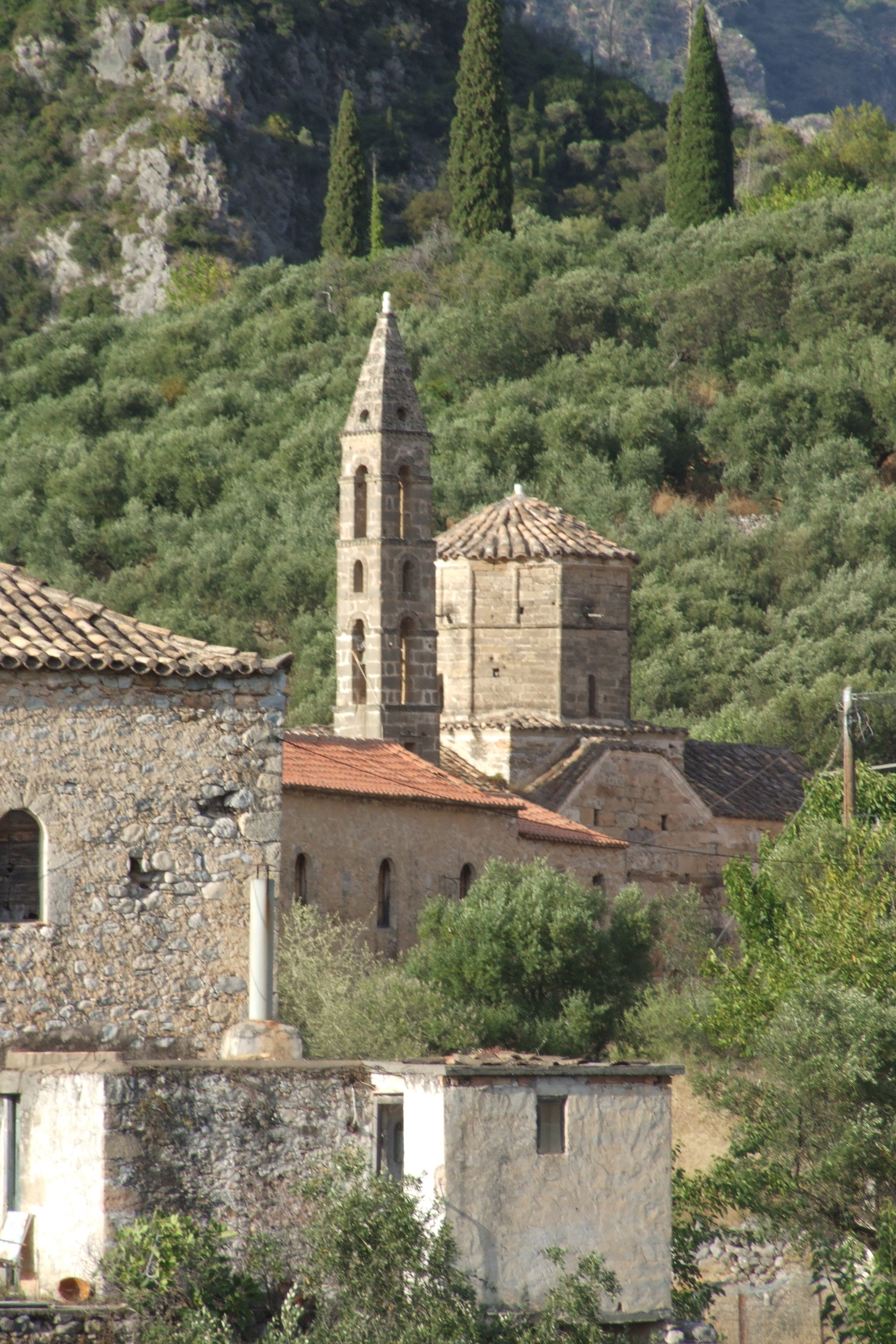
The Church of St. Spyridon in Old Kardamyli

Kardamyli (Greek: Καρδαμύλη, variously transliterated as Kardamyle, Cardamyle, Kardhamili, and Kardamili) is a village in Greece on the Mani Peninsula in the southern Peloponnese. It is the seat of the municipality of West Mani in the regional unit of Messenia. It was commonly labelled "Skardamoula" on older maps.

In the Iliad (Book 9), Homer cites Kardamyli as one of the seven cities offered by Agamemnon to Achilles as a condition to rejoin the fight during the Trojan War. The village preserves its ancient name.

The area has several beaches: Ritsa, Belogianni, Salio, Tikla, Megalo Amoni, Mikro Amoni, Masklimitsa. The older town includes a medieval castle and outworks. The imposing Church of Saint Spyridon in the fortified compound of the Mourtzinoi-Troupakis clan was constructed in the 18th century and re-uses some material of ancient and Byzantine origin. Many of the buildings of Old Kardamyli (Pano Kardamyli, or "Upper Kardamyli") were built by the Venetians and feature a mix of traditional Greek and Venetian design. Like that of many Maniot towns, Kardamyli's skyline is dominated by distinctive tower houses. Many were constructed by scions of the Nikliani clans, the mediaeval aristocracy of the Mani.

Kardamyli is a trailhead for many mountain paths, some of which lead to the peak of Mount Taygetus, known locally as Profitis Ilias, "Prophet Elias". Nearby is the Viros Gorge, with a total length of 20 kilometres (12 mi). The gorge is dry in summer but regularly floods in winter due to snowmelt and heavy rains. Kalamata, Oitylo, Areopoli and the Diros caves are nearby.

The village of Kalamitsi just outside Kardamyli was the principal home of English writer Patrick Leigh Fermor and his wife Joan in his later years. He was made an honorary citizen of the village for his participation in the Greek Resistance during World War II.

The ashes of the writer Bruce Chatwin were scattered near a Byzantine chapel above the village in 1989.

== Climate ==
Kardamyli, like much of Greece, experiences a very mild, subtropical Mediterranean climate, with hot, dry summers and cool, wet winters. Snow is almost unknown in the town itself, only falling a few times per century. Snow is, however, common in the mountains above Kardamyli, with the Profitis Ilias typically remaining snow capped until early June. Winter rainfall in the area is often heavy, with spectacular flooding in the Viros gorge occurring every few years. In summer, by contrast, rain is scarce. Summer thunderstorms are exceptionally rare, bringing short, heavy downpours. Summertime temperatures usually range around 32–35 °C (90–95 °F), but heat waves with temperatures above 38 °C (100 °F) are common. The cooling Meltemi wind which blows across much of Greece is largely blocked by the mountains of the area, resulting in unusually calm seas which are often lake-like in the morning, before the sea breeze kicks up. Spring and Fall are warm to cool with changeable weather. Heavy hailstorms are known to strike the area in early spring and mid fall, sometimes causing damage to the local olive crop, as the olives or flowers are knocked out of their trees by falling hailstones.

Global warming and climate change are especially felt in the area, with summers becoming more tropical – featuring higher humidity with occasional afternoon thunderstorms and warmer nights. Winters are becoming warmer and drier. Due to these climatic changes, tropical plants such as mango, avocado, lychee, and plumeria are becoming a more common sight in the area, giving the town an exotic and lush feel. At night, the town often smells of these new tropical flowers and jasmine, as well as eucalyptus, as light mountain breezes blow the smells through the town.

The following is climate data for nearby Kalamata. Winter low temperatures tend to be a bit higher than those of Kalamata, as the Taygetos block much of the northerly winds which bring cold air down from the rest of Europe.

Climate data for Kalamata
Month	Jan	Feb	Mar	Apr	May	Jun	Jul	Aug	Sep	Oct	Nov	Dec	Year
Record high °C (°F)	23.0 (73.4)	23.6 (74.5)	25.2 (77.4)	29.8 (85.6)	37.0 (98.6)	41.8 (107.2)	45.6 (114.1)	39.4 (102.9)	38.4 (101.1)	32.8 (91.0)	29.0 (84.2)	26.0 (78.8)	45.6 (114.1)
Mean daily maximum °C (°F)	15.5 (59.9)	15.7 (60.3)	18.0 (64.4)	21.0 (69.8)	25.1 (77.2)	29.0 (84.2)	32.5 (90.5)	31.8 (89.2)	28.9 (84.0)	24.9 (76.8)	20.7 (69.3)	16.9 (62.4)	23.3 (74.0)
Daily mean °C (°F)	10.2 (50.4)	10.6 (51.1)	12.9 (55.2)	15.2 (59.4)	19.7 (67.5)	24.1 (75.4)	26.4 (79.5)	26.3 (79.3)	23.2 (73.8)	19.9 (67.8)	15.0 (59.0)	11.7 (53.1)	17.9 (64.3)
Mean daily minimum °C (°F)	6.0 (42.8)	6.0 (42.8)	7.1 (44.8)	9.2 (48.6)	12.7 (54.9)	16.3 (61.3)	19.1 (66.4)	19.7 (67.5)	16.7 (62.1)	13.7 (56.7)	10.2 (50.4)	7.5 (45.5)	12.0 (53.7)
Record low °C (°F)	−4 (25)	−2.2 (28.0)	−2.6 (27.3)	3.4 (38.1)	6.4 (43.5)	10.0 (50.0)	13.0 (55.4)	13.4 (56.1)	10.6 (51.1)	5.2 (41.4)	0.6 (33.1)	−1 (30)	−4 (25)
Average precipitation mm (inches)	111.7 (4.40)	94.1 (3.70)	73.0 (2.87)	48.5 (1.91)	25.6 (1.01)	7.5 (0.30)	4.2 (0.17)	11.3 (0.44)	29.1 (1.15)	85.3 (3.36)	137.4 (5.41)	152.6 (6.01)	780.3 (30.72)
Average precipitation days	12.3	10.9	10.3	6.1	5.1	1.9	0.3	0.4	1.9	6.9	10.0	11.6	77.7
Average relative humidity (%)	72.6	71.7	71.2	70.4	66.3	58.6	58.0	61.1	65.2	69.3	74.8	75.0	70.1
Mean monthly sunshine hours	143.6	140.8	185.9	212.2	286.0	338.2	367.6	346.6	269.9	205.6	150.6	131.1	2,778.1
Mean daily sunshine hours	5	5	6	7	9	11	12	12	9	7	5	4	8
Percentage possible sunshine	37	32	31	31	45	72	95	92	73	56	44	36	54
Source 1: Greek National Weather Service
Source 2: NOAA

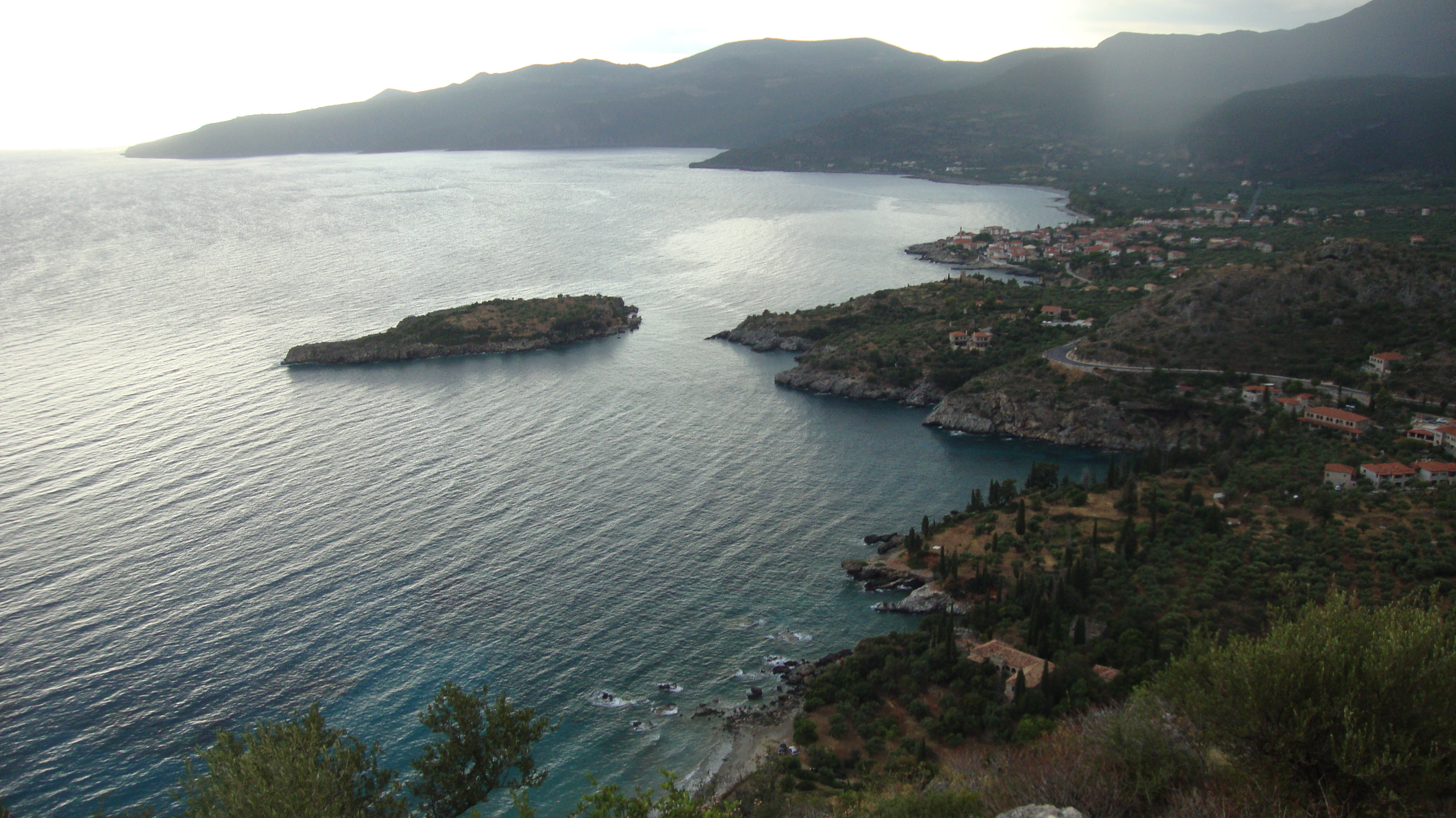
View of Kardamyli at dusk

== Geography ==
Kardamyli sits at the foot of the Taygetus mountains on the coast of the Messenian Gulf. Much of the town sits on the remnants of a prehistoric lava flow, still visible as igneous rock formations which extend to the beaches. The nearest settlements are Kampos to the north and Proastio to the southeast.

== History ==
Kardamyli is one of the oldest settlements in the Peloponnese, with its current name being mentioned in the Iliad, the epic poem by ancient Greek writer Homer. Many of the townspeople can trace their lineage back to either famed clans of the area (as in the Mourtzinos and Troupakis clans), or the Byzantine Emperor Constantine Palaiologos, one of whose descendants (Dimitri Palaiologos) settled in the region. The descendants of Dimitris Palaiologos typically have the last name "Dimitreas", meaning "son of Dimitri'.

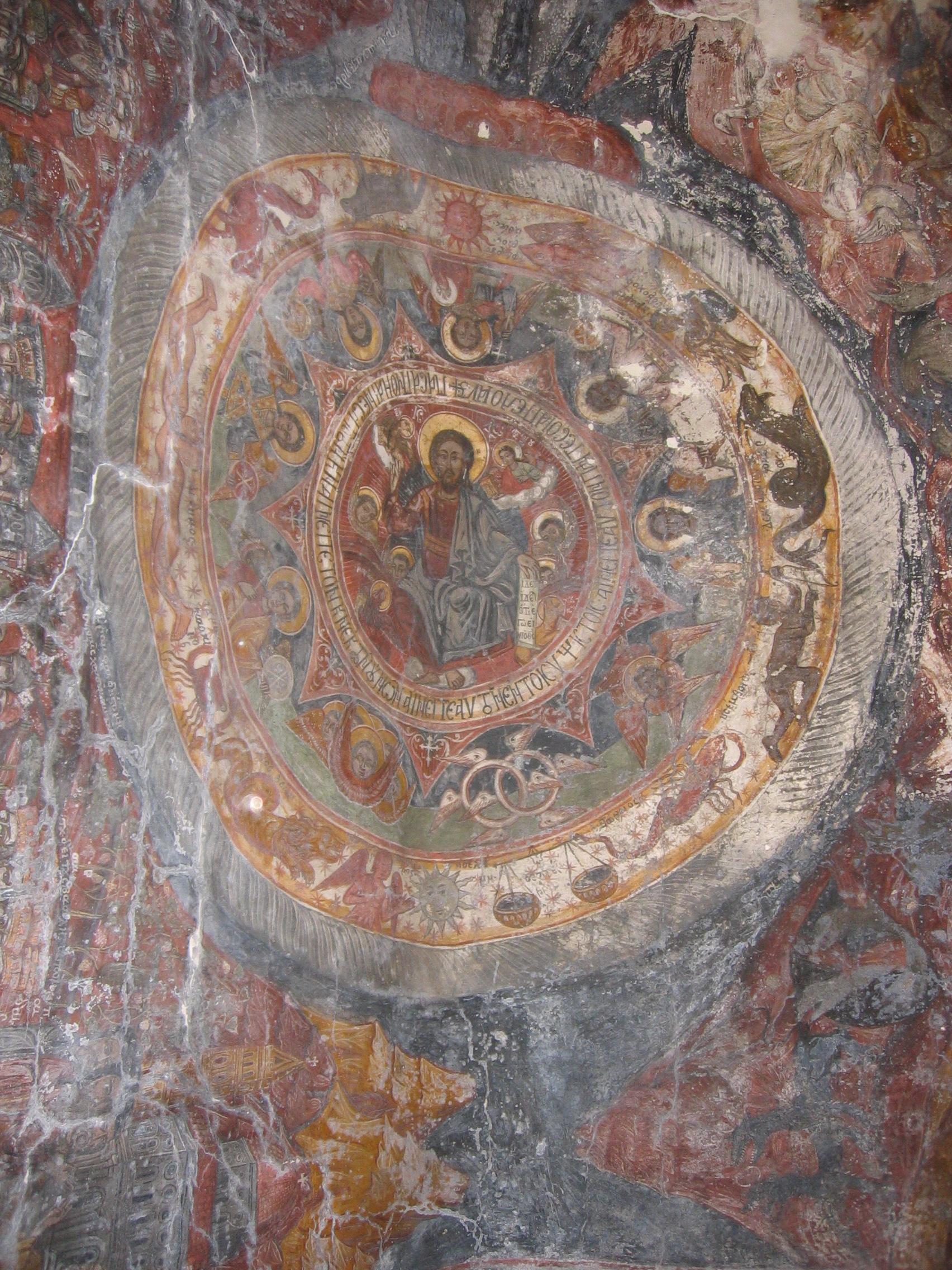
The dome of the Byzantine-Era Church of Eisodia

== Notable sites ==
- The buildings of Pano Kardamyli, dating back to Venetian times.
- The church of St. Spyridon.
- The tombs of the Dioskouri, Castor and Pollux (the Gemini twins) are believed to be near a hiking trail just above the old town.
- The ruins of the old soap factory, the smokestack of which still dominates the town's skyline.
- The old customs house, in St. John's harbor (now privately owned and converted into a house).

== Gallery ==
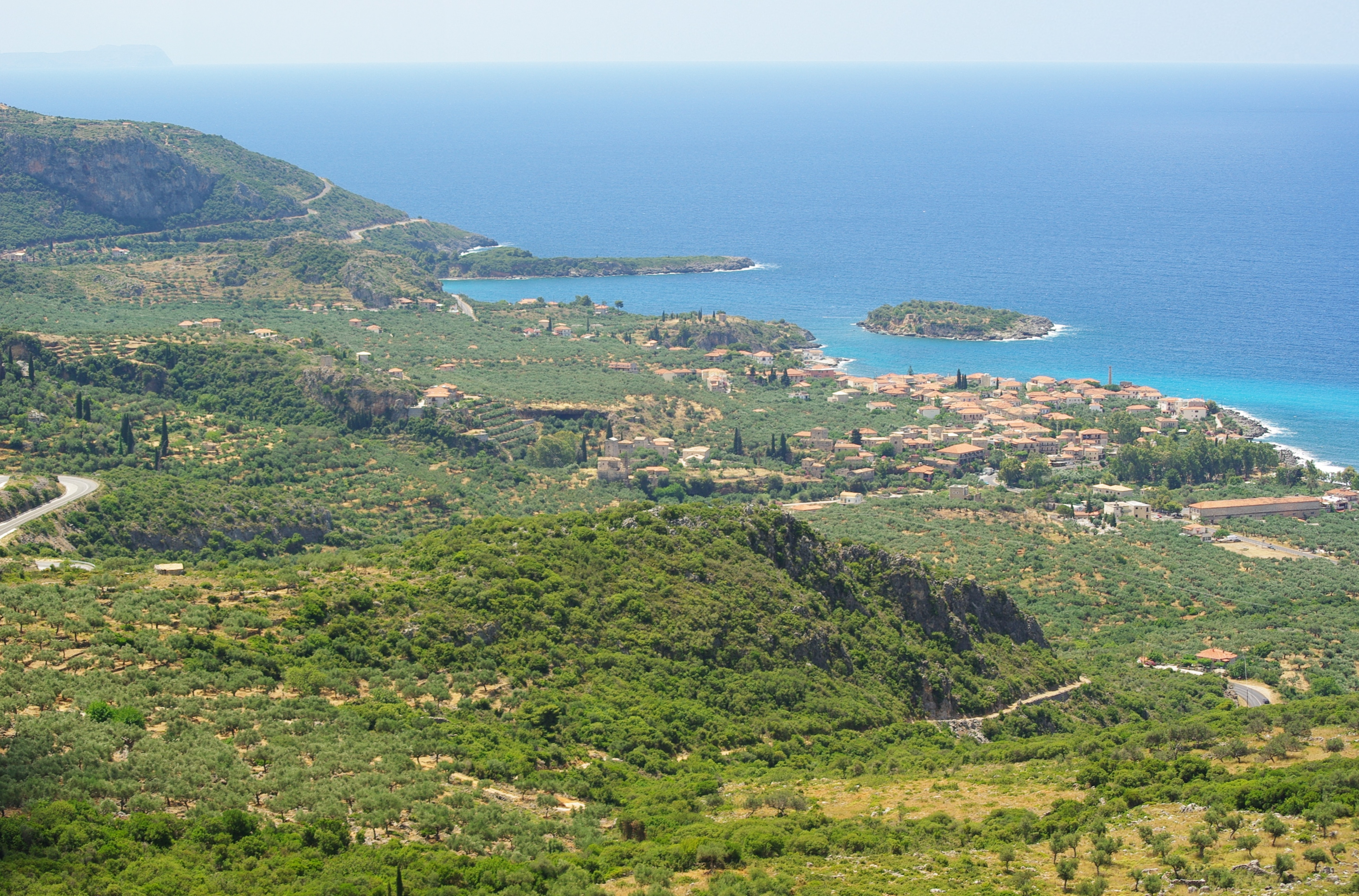
View of Kardamyli

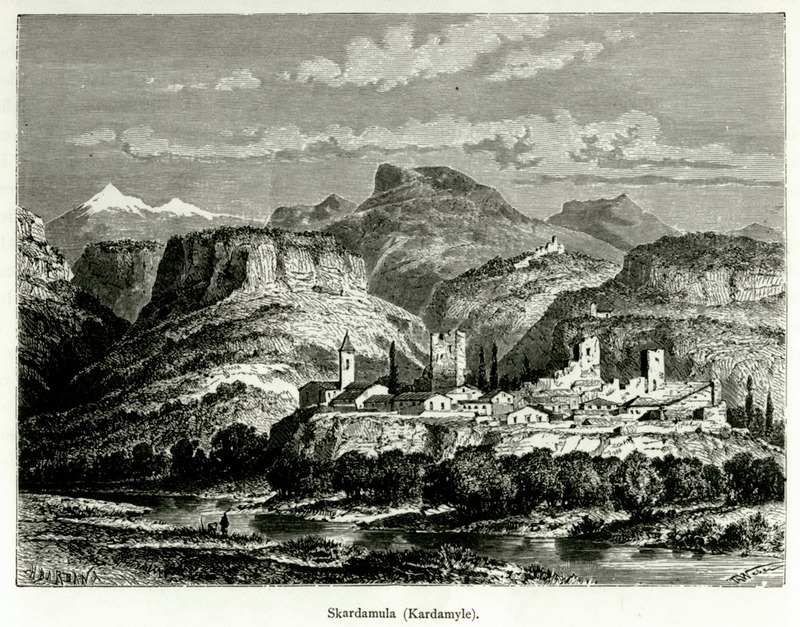
Kardamyli in the 1880s

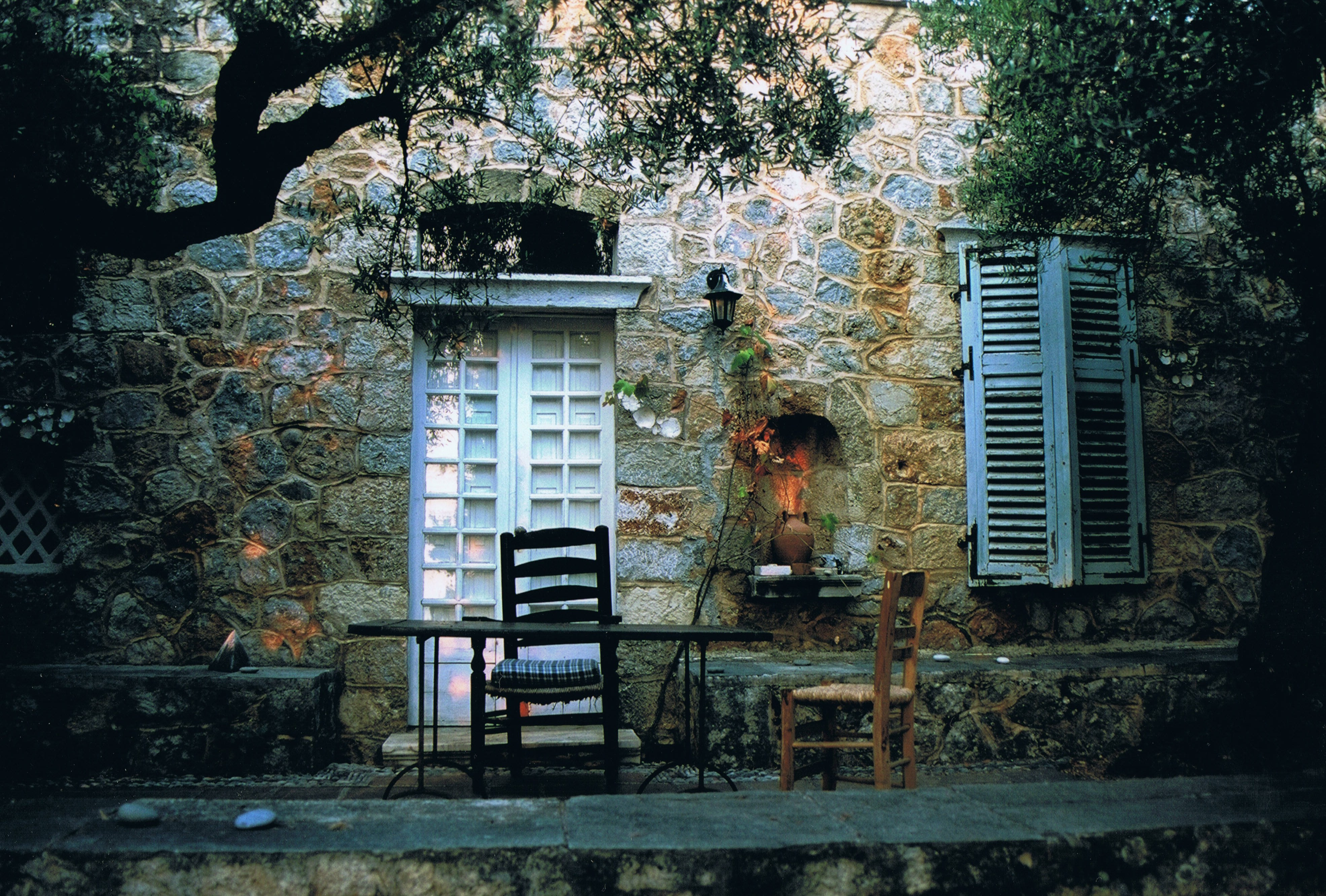
Desk in the P.M.L. Fermor garden near Kardamyli

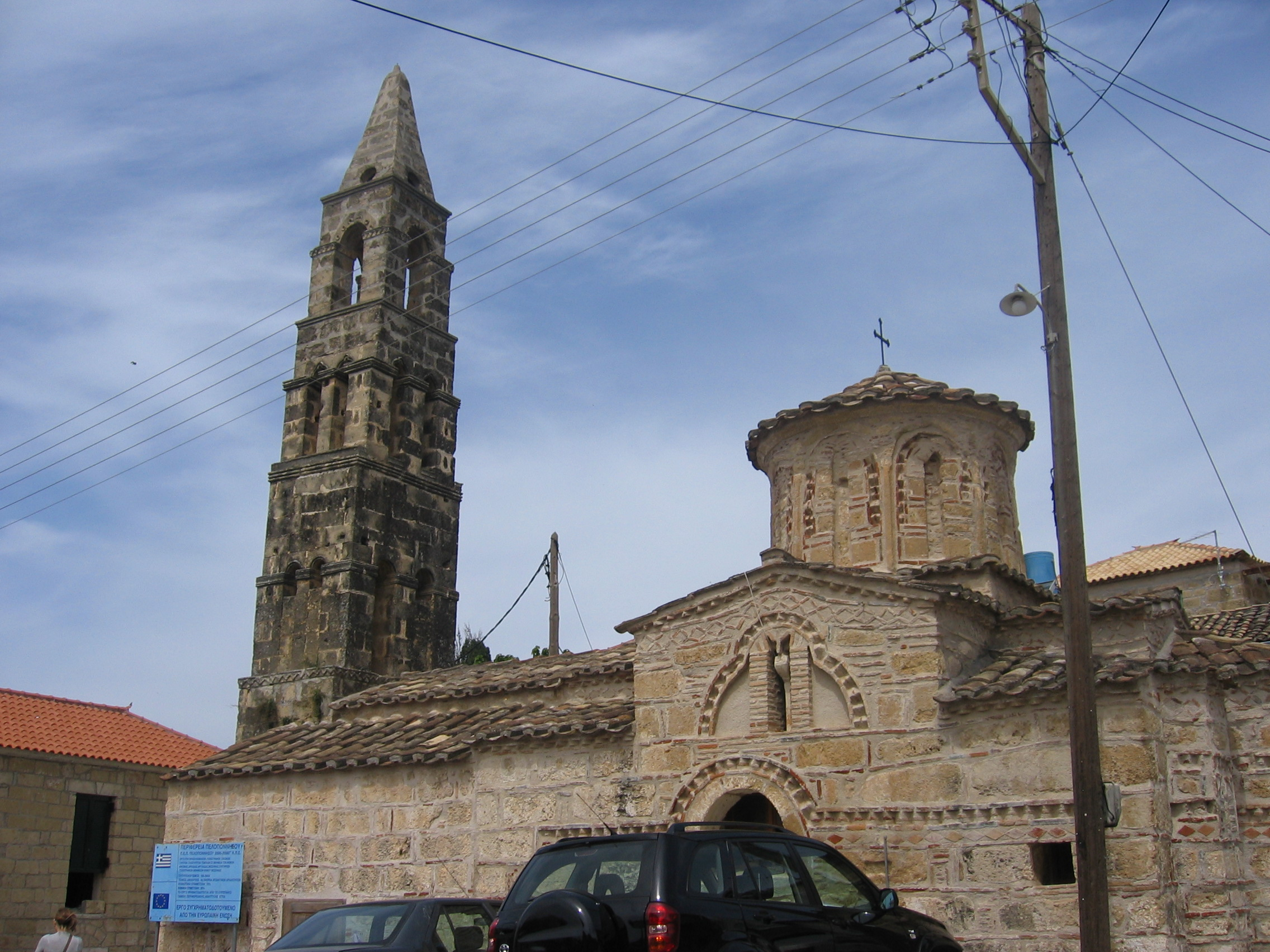
Eisodia church in Kardamyli
