= Ira =

Ira or IRA may refer to:

== Human names ==
- Ira (name), a Hebrew, Sanskrit, Russian or Finnish language personal name
- Ira (surname), a rare Estonian family name; occurs in some other languages
- Irina or Ira, a given name

== Law and finance ==
- Indian Reorganization Act of 1934, US, on status of Native Americans
- Individual retirement account (or individual retirement arrangement), in the US, giving tax benefits
- Inflation Reduction Act of 2022, a US budget reconciliation bill
- Internal Revenue Allotment, a local share of Philippines government revenue

== Music ==
- Ira (Polish band), a Polish heavy metal band
- Ira!, a Brazilian rock band
- I.R.A. (band), a Colombian punk band
- One part of an Andean wind instrument, the siku

== Organizations ==
=== Sport ===
- Intercollegiate Rowing Association, US
- International Racing Association, defunct US stock car racing league active in the 1980s
- Islamabad Rugby Association

=== Militant organizations ===
- Irish Republican Army, which has existed in various forms since 1919:
  - Irish Republican Army (1919–1922)
  - Irish Republican Army (1922–1969)
  - Official Irish Republican Army (1969–1972)
  - Provisional Irish Republican Army (1969–2005)
  - Continuity Irish Republican Army (1986/1994–present)
  - Real Irish Republican Army (1997–2012)
  - New IRA (2012–present)

=== In other fields ===
- Indian Rationalist Association
- Indian Rights Association, US, for Native Americans
- Initiative for the Resurgence of the Abolitionist Movement (IRA), a Mauritania anti-slavery group
- Instituto Riva-Agüero, in Peru
- Insurance Regulatory Authority (Kenya), the authority charged with regulation and supervision of Kenya's insurance industry
- Interim Regional Administration of Tigray (IRA), Tigray Region, Ethiopia
- International Reading Association, now the International Literacy Association
- Internet Research Agency or "The Trolls of Olgino", a Russian state-sponsored troll group
- Inverness Royal Academy, a secondary school in Inverness, Scotland
- Iran Air, an Iranian airline (ICAO designator IRA)
- Íslenskir Radíóamatörar, ÍRA, an amateur radio organization in Iceland

== Places ==
=== Greece ===
- Ire (Iliad) or Ira, a town mentioned in the Iliad
- Ira (Lesbos), a town of ancient Lesbos
- Eira (Messenia), or Ira, an ancient town of Messenia
- Eira, Messenia or Ira, a municipality in northern Messenia

=== United States ===
- Ira, Iowa
- Ira Township, Michigan
- Ira, Missouri
- Ira, New York
- Ira, Texas
- Ira, Vermont

=== Elsewhere ===
- Ira, Mazandaran, a village in Mazandaran Province, Iran
- Ira, Suwayda, a village in as-Suwayda Governorate, Syria
- Ira, Tehran, a village in Tehran Province, Iran
- Lielirbe or Īra, Latvia
- Ira, Republic of Bashkortostan, Russia
- Iran (UNDP code IRA)
- Islamic Republic of Afghanistan, an official name of Afghanistan in exile

== Other uses ==
- Ira, Latin for wrath, one of the seven deadly sins
- Ira (film), a 2018 Indian (Malayalam) film
- Ira (mythology), a goddess in Polynesian mythology
- Ira (moth), a genus
- Inherited runs allowed, a baseball statistic
- International Reference Alphabet, a character encoding
- Ileorectal anastomosis, surgery to join the ileum with the rectum
