= Doloi =

Doloi Δολοί
- Community
- Location within Greece
- Coordinates: 36°56′N 22°10′E
- Country: Greece
- Administrative region: Peloponnese
- Regional unit: Messenia
- Municipality: West Mani
- Municipal unit: Avia

Population (2021)
  - Community: 275
- Time zone: UTC+2 (EET)
  - Summer (DST): UTC+3 (EEST)
- Vehicle registration: KM

Doloi (Greek: Δολοί) is a community of the municipality West Mani, in Messenia, southern Greece. The community consists of the villages Kato Doloi, Ano Doloi, Kitries, Kalianaiika and Geranou. Doloi is located in the northwestern part of the Mani peninsula, on the east coast of the Messenian Gulf. It is 3 km west of Kampos, 4 km southeast of Avia and 12 km southeast of Kalamata. Kitries is on the coast, the other villages are in the hills.
