= Leuctra (Laconia) =

Town of ancient Laconia

Coordinates: 36°50′34″N 22°15′54″E

Leuctra or Leuktra (Ancient Greek: τὰ Λεῦκτρα), also Leuctrum or Leuktron (τὸ Λεῦκτρον), was a town of ancient Laconia, situated on the eastern side of the Messenian Gulf, 20 stadia north of Pephnus, and 60 stadia south of Cardamyle. Strabo speaks of Leuctrum as a colony of the Leuctra in Boeotia, near the minor Pamisus, but this river flows into the sea at Pephnus, about three miles (5 km) south of Leuctrum.

== History ==
Leuctrum was said to have been founded by Pelops, and was claimed by the Messenians as originally one of their towns. It was awarded to the latter people by Philip II of Macedon in 338 BCE, but in the time of the Roman Empire it was one of the Eleuthero-Laconian towns.

== Temples of Athena and Cassandra ==
Pausanias saw in Leuctra a temple and statue of Athena on the acropolis, a temple and statue of Cassandra (there called Alexandra), a marble statue of Asclepius, another of Ino, and wooden figures of Apollo Carneius.

Leuctra's site is located near the modern Stoupa.
