= Mikri Mantineia =

Mikri Mantineia Μικρή Μαντίνεια
- Community
- Location within Greece
- Coordinates: 36°59′N 22°9′E
- Country: Greece
- Administrative region: Peloponnese
- Regional unit: Messenia
- Municipality: Kalamata
- Municipal unit: Kalamata

Population (2021)
  - Community: 615
- Time zone: UTC+2 (EET)
  - Summer (DST): UTC+3 (EEST)
- Vehicle registration: KM

Mikri Mantineia (Greek: Μικρή Μαντίνεια) is a seaside village in the municipality of Kalamata, Messenia, Greece. It is situated at 20 m above sea level, on the northeastern shore of the Gulf of Messenia. Its main industry is tourism. Mikri Mantineia is 2 km northeast of Avia, 3 km north of Megali Mantineia and 6 km southeast of Kalamata.

== Population ==
Year	Population
1851	157
1879	183
1907	173
1981	303
1991	606
2001	688
2011	705
2021	615

== History ==
The village was probably founded in the second half of the 17th century in an inland location which is now known as Palio Chorio. It was first mentioned in 1700 as Chora Mikri ("small village"), as opposed to the older and larger Megali Mantineia. It had 35 families (165 people) in 1700 and 31 in 1703 which produced around 3,204 okades of oil (4,178 kg). It became a part of the municipality of Avia in 1835.

In the early 20th century, a small part of the population moved into the nearby beach areas of Mourti, Panitsa and Myloi. It had 157 inhabitants in 1851, 183 in 1879 and 173 in 1907. From 1914, it ran an independent community and had 177 inhabitants in 1928. A strong earthquake damages most houses of the village in 1944. The inhabitants moved into the coastal areas. The new seaside settlement was named Mikri Mantineia and the other Palio Chorio. After 1970, many new inhabitants moved into the village, and the new settlement Perivola was built.

Mikri Mantineia became a part of the city of Kalamata in 1988 while Megali Mantineia joined the municipality of Avia. Although the two Mantineies are part of different municipalities, they still form one entity from the geographic, population and economic side and they have a common Olive Production Committee.

== Points of interests ==
- The Kapetanakis Tower
- A few monasteries

== Sources ==
- Theodoros Belitsos Mantineies in 1700, Economic Demographic and Onomatologic Origins, 1999
- Stavros Kapetanakis I Mandinies tis Manis (Οι Μαντίνειες της Μάνης - Madinies of Mani)

== See also ==
- List of settlements in Messenia
- Megali Mantineia
