= Ira (surname) =

Estonian-language surname

The surname Ira may refer to:

- Leo Ira (born 1951), an Estonian football trainer and manager
- Longin Ira (1890s–1987), a Russian emigrant, White army officer, agent "Bureau Klatt" and Abwehr operative.

== See also ==
- Ira (disambiguation)
- Ira (mythology)
- Ira (name)
