= Mesola (Messenia) =

Town of ancient Messenia

Mesola (Ancient Greek: Μεσόλα) was a town of ancient Messenia. Strabo says that it was one of the five cities in which the mythical Cresphontes divided Messenia when he took over the power of the area. Its territory extended between Taygetus and Messenia, and reached the Gulf of Messenia. The geographer mentions that there were some who were of the opinion that he should identify with the city Homeric of Ire.

Its site is unlocated.
