= Ire =

Ire or IRE may refer to:

- Extreme anger; intense fury
- Irē, the Livonian name for Mazirbe, Latvia
- A town in Oye, Nigeria
- Ire (album), a 2015 album by the Australian metalcore band Parkway Drive
- Ire (Iliad), a town mentioned in the Iliad
- Ire, another name of Eira (Messenia), a fortress town of ancient Messenia
- An abbreviation of Ireland usually referring to the Island of Ireland or the bodies surrounding it
- A colloquial term for an Irish person
- Institute of Radio Engineers
- Institute of the Regions of Europe, a European research institute
- Investigative Reporters and Editors
- Ireland, UNDP country code
- Iron Realms Entertainment
- Iron response element, a regulatory RNA sequence
- Irreversible electroporation, a medical soft tissue ablation method
- IRE (unit), a unit used to measure amplitude of composite video signals
- Interregio-Express, a train category in Germany
- Institute for Regional Education, the organization responsible for producing the Qatsi trilogy
- Imperial Rescript on Education, a rescript signed by Emperor Meiji of Japan on 30 October 1890 to articulate government policy on the guiding principles of education on the Empire of Japan
