= Megali Mantineia =

Megali Mantineia Μεγάλη Μαντίνεια
- Settlement
- Location within Greece
- Coordinates: 36°57′24″N 22°09′49″E
- Country: Greece
- Administrative region: Peloponnese
- Regional unit: Messenia
- Municipality: West Mani
- Municipal unit: Avia
- Community: Avia

Population (2021)
  - Total: 211
- Time zone: UTC+2 (EET)
  - Summer (DST): UTC+3 (EEST)
- Vehicle registration: KM

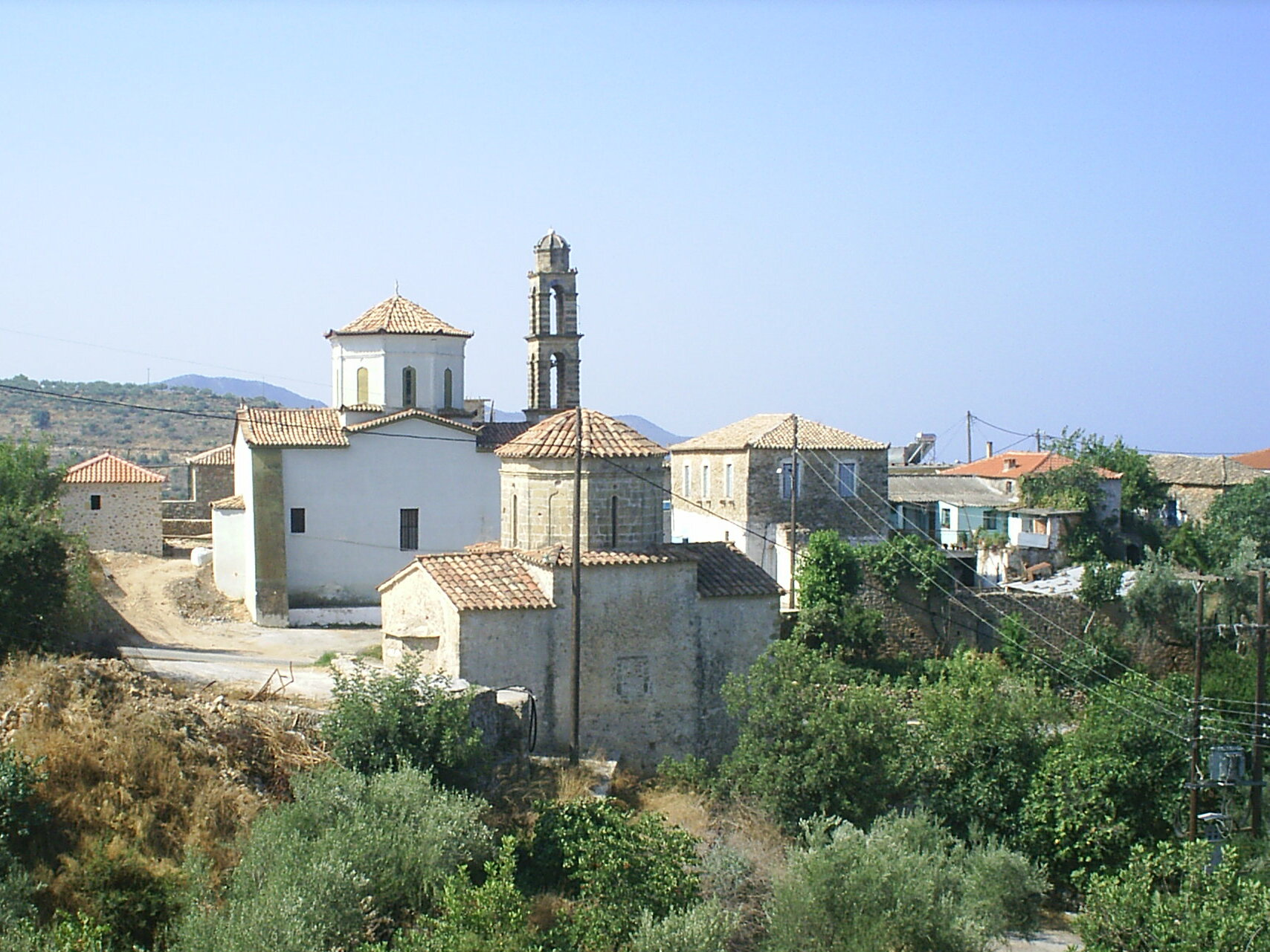
The temple of Megali Mantineia Abia

Megali Mantineia (Greek: Μεγάλη Μαντίνεια) is a mountain settlement in the municipal unit of Avia, Messenia, Greece. It sits at 200m above sea level, 2 km southeast of Avia, 3 km south of Mikri Mantineia and 10 km southeast of Kalamata. Many of its residents only stay there during the summer months.

== Population ==
Year	Population
1851	413
1879	469
1907	424
1991	164
2001	155
2011	191
2021	211

== History ==
Ano Mantineia ("Upper Mantineia") or Ano Chora was first mentioned in 1463, as opposed to the older Mantineia on the coast. In the mid 18th century, it was an important settlement in the area of Zarnata (Ζαρνάτα). It had 59 families (around 277 people) in 1704. In the late 18th century the smaller settlement Mikri Mantineia was founded, and the older Ano Mantineia was renamed to Megali Mantineia ("Great Mantineia").

The village joined the municipality of Avia in 1835. From the mid 19th century, a part of the population moved into the seaside areas including Palaiochora (now Avia), Archontiko and Akrogiali. Still Megali Mantineia kept a large population: 413 in 1851, 469 in 1879 and 424 in 1907. In 1914 Megali Mantineia became an independent community which included the new settlements. In 1924 the seat of the community moved to the seaside village Palaiochora. In 1926 both the settlement Palaiochora and the community were renamed to Avia.

== Points of interests ==
- Ridomo Gorge
- Koskaras/Santova cave
- Katafygi, an inaccessible cave
- The deserted settlement Koka
- Santova/Sadova beach
- Churches of Agios Andreas (1754) and the Dormition of the Virgin Mary
- The old school, built in 1743-53

== Sources ==
- Theodoros Belitsos Ta Altomira tis Exo Manis (Τα Αλτομιρά της Έξω Μάνης (Ιστορία-Οικογένειες-Τοπωνύμια) = Altomira in Outer Mani (History-Family-Toponyms), 1999

== See also ==
- List of settlements in Messenia
- Mikri Mantineia
