= Leuktron Castle =

Crusader castle in southern Greece

Coordinates: 36.8428°N 22.2650°E

The castle of Leuktron (Greek: Λεύκτρον) or Beaufort is a late medieval fortification in Greece in the southern Peloponnese, on the Mani Peninsula. It is on the eastern shore of the Messenian Gulf, close to the ancient settlement of Leuctra and the modern village of Stoupa.

The castle of Leuktron was built c. 1249, when the Mani Peninsula was part of the Principality of Achaea, a crusader state on the Peloponnese. Prince of Achaea William II Villehardouin had it constructed in order to subdue the Slavic tribes living on Mount Taygetos.

The castle sits on a large rock rising above the shore which forms a platform some 120 metres (390 ft) long, 50 metres (160 ft) wide and 80 metres (260 ft) high. The curtain wall is constructed of irregular-sized stones mixed with brick fragments. Remnants of a square keep and a cistern are still visible in the interior.

== Sources ==
- Andrews, Kevin A. (2006). Castles of the Morea. American School of Classical Studies at Athens. ISBN 978-0-87661-406-8.
- Bon, Antoine (1969). La Morée franque. Recherches historiques, topographiques et archéologiques sur la principauté d'Achaïe [The Frankish Morea. Historical, Topographic and Archaeological Studies on the Principality of Achaea] (in French). Paris: De Boccard. OCLC 869621129.
- Setton, Kenneth M. (1976). The Papacy and the Levant (1204–1571), Volume I: The Thirteenth and Fourteenth Centuries. Philadelphia: The American Philosophical Society. ISBN 0-87169-114-0.
