= Gerenia =

Town of ancient Messenia, Greece

Coordinates: 36°56′02″N 22°11′42″E

Gerenia (Ancient Greek: Γερηνία), or Gerena (τὰ Γέρηνα), or Gerenus or Gerenos (Γέρηνος), was a town of ancient Messenia, where, according to Greek mythology, Nestor was said to have been brought up, and whence he derived the surname Gerenian, which occurs so frequently in the Iliad of Homer. There is, however, no town of this name mentioned in Homer, and many of the ancient critics identified the later Gerenia with the Homeric Enope.

Under the Roman Empire Gerenia was the most northerly of the towns of the League of Free Laconians. It was situated on the eastern side of the Messenian Gulf upon a mountainous promontory. Pausanias wrote in the 2nd century CE that there had been a mountain called Calathium in Gerenia with a sanctuary of Claea, an Oread. Two ancient inscriptions discovered at Gerenia were translated by the 19th-century German classicist August Böckh.

The Gerenia site is located near Zarnata Castle аbove the modern village Kampos.
