= IRAS (disambiguation) =

IRAS may refer to:

- Indian Railway Accounts Service
- Infrared Astronomical Satellite
- Inland Revenue Authority of Singapore
- Iras, a character in Antony and Cleopatra; see List of Shakespearean characters

== See also ==
- IRA (disambiguation)
