= Ira (name) =

Ira (/ˈiːrə/ or /ˈaɪərə/ or /ˈaɪrə/) is a unisex given name.

As a Sanskrit male name, its meaning is that of the wind god, Vayu. As a female name its meaning is "the Earth". She is daughter of Daksha Prajapati and is wife of Kashyapa Maharishi and she is mother of plants, creepers and trees. In short she is the mother of all vegetation.

In Belarusian, Russian and Ukrainian, Ira (/ˈiːrə/) is a female given name, a diminutive of Iryna.

In Finland, Ira is a female given name, a version of the name of the Greek goddess Hera, Ήρα, queen of the gods and wife of Zeus.

In Hebrew, the name Ira (עִירָא, Modern Hebrew Ira, Tiberian Hebrew ʻÎrâ) has several meanings, among them "Watchful".

== Biblical ==
- Ira the Jairite, King David's priest or chief minister
- Ira ben Ikkesh of Tekoa, a fighter among King David's Mighty Warriors

== People ==
- Ira H. Abbott (1906–1988), American aerospace engineer
- Ira Aldridge (1807–1867), American actor
- Ira Allen (1751–1814), American politician
- Ira Alterman (1945–2015), American journalist and author
- Ira Angustain (born 1958), American actor
- Ira Aten (1862–1953), American sheriff
- Ira Babcock (1808–1888), American pioneer
- Ira Baldwin (1895–1999), American scientist
- Ira Coleman Batman (1862–1934), American jurist and politician
- Ira Steven Behr (born 1953), American television producer
- Ira Berkow (born 1940), American writer
- Ira Berlin (1941–2018), American historian
- Ira Brahm Born (1924–2023), American businessman and inventor
- Ira Bowman (born 1973), American basketball player
- Ira Brown (born 1982), Japanese basketball player
- Ira Byock (born 1951), American physician and author
- Ira Cohen (1935 – 2011), American poet, publisher, photographer, and filmmaker
- Ira Colitz (1916–1998), American businessman and politician
- Ira Condict (1764–1811), American college president
- Ira Clifton Copley (1864–1947), American politician and newspaper publisher
- Ira P. DeLoache (1879–1965), American real estate developer
- Ira Deutchman (born 1953), American film producer
- Ira Drukier (born 1945), American hotelier
- Ira Dubey (born 1984), Indian film actress
- Ira Einhorn (1940–2020), American convicted murderer
- Ira C. Eaker (1896–1987), American general
- Ira Allen Eastman (1809–1881), American politician
- Ira Elliot (born 1963), American drummer
- Ira Flatow (born 1949), American radio and television journalist
- Ira Fuchs (born 1948), American computer scientist
- Ira A. Fulton (born 1931), American businessman
- Ira Gershwin (1896–1983), American lyricist
- Ira Gitler (1928–2019), American jazz historian and journalist
- Ira Glass (born 1959), American radio presenter
- Ira Glasser (born 1938), former director of the American Civil Liberties Union
- Ira B. Harkey Jr. (1918–2006), American writer
- Ira Hamilton Hayes (1923–1955), United States Marine and Pima Native American, photographed raising the flag on Mount Suribachi, Iwo Jima
- Ira G. Hedrick (1868–1937), American civil engineer
- Ira Herskowitz (1946–2003), American geneticist
- Ira B. Hyde (1838–1926), American politician
- Ira Kaplan (born 1957), American musician
- Ira Katznelson (born 1944), American political scientist
- Ira Levin (1929–2007), American writer
- Ira A. Lipman (1940–2019), American businessman and philanthropist
- Ira M. Lish (1855–1937), American politician
- Ira Losco (born 1981), Maltese singer
- Ira Magaziner (born 1947), American consultant
- Ira Mellman, American cell biologist
- Ira Newborn (born 1949), American composer
- Ira C. Owens (born 1936), American general
- Ira Pastan (born 1931), American scientist
- Ira B. Pauly (born 1930), American psychiatrist
- Ira Pierce (1874–1906), American chemist and college sports coach
- Ira Remsen (1846–1927), American chemist
- Ira Sachs (born 1965), American filmmaker
- Ira Sankey (1840–1908), American singer
- Ira "Ike" Schab (1920–2025), American World War II Navy veteran
- Ira Sharkansky (born 1938), American political scientist
- Ira Shor (born 1945), American educator
- Ira Stoll (born 1972), American journalist
- Ira Valentine (1963–2022), American football player
- Ira Wolfert (1908–1997), American war correspondent

== Fictional characters ==
- Ira Buchman, character in the American television series Mad About You
- Ira Carlton, character in the British sketch show The League of Gentlemen
- Ira Gaines, character in the American television series 24
- Ira Gamagoori, character in the Japanese anime series Kill La Kill
- Ira S. Glicksberg or Sensei Ira, a recurring character played by Lance Krall in the U.S. comedy series, The Office
- Ira Goldstein, character in ASB Bank advertisements in New Zealand
- Ira Graves, character in an episode of the television series Star Trek: The Next Generation, Data's "grandfather"
- Ira Hath, character in the Wind on Fire Trilogy by William Nicholson
- Ira Hogeboom, character in the video game L.A. Noire
- Ira Levinson, character in the 2013 Nicholas Sparks novel The Longest Ride, portrayed by Alan Alda and Jack Huston in the 2015 film of the same name
- Ira Lowenstein, character portrayed by David Strathairn in the movie A League of Their Own
- Ira Poppus, a character in the 1992 TV comedy Revenge of the Nerds III
- Ira Ringold, the main protagonist of Philip Roth's novel I Married a Communist
- Ira Rosenbloom, character portrayed by Richard Kind in the TV series Young Sheldon
- Ira Shalowitz, a character in the 1991 American comedy film City Slickers
- Ira Wright, character portrayed by Seth Rogen in the comedy film, Funny People
- Ira, a sentient AI from the game Random Access Mayhem.
- Ira, a character representing anger and the gender experience in The Shadows: Nova's Love by E. Kathryn
- Ira Irawati, a character from the game DreadOut.

== See also ==
- Ira (disambiguation)
- Ira (mythology)
