= Pefnos =

Coordinates: 36°48′39″N 22°17′42″E

Pefnos or Pephnos or Pephnus (Ancient Greek: Πέφνος), or Pephnum or Pephnon (Πεφνόν), was a town of ancient Laconia, on the eastern coast of the Messenian Gulf, distant 20 stadia from Thalamae. Nowadays, the village Agios Dimitrios of the municipality of West Mani is near or on the spot that ancient Pefnos existed. In front of it, there is a small island of the same name (Pefnos island), which Pausanias describes as not larger than a great rock, in which stood, in the open air, brazen statues of the Dioscuri, a foot high. There was a tradition, that the Dioscuri were born in this island. The island is at the mouth of the river Miléa, which is the minor Pamisus of Strabo. The Messenians said that their territories originally extended as far as Pefnos.

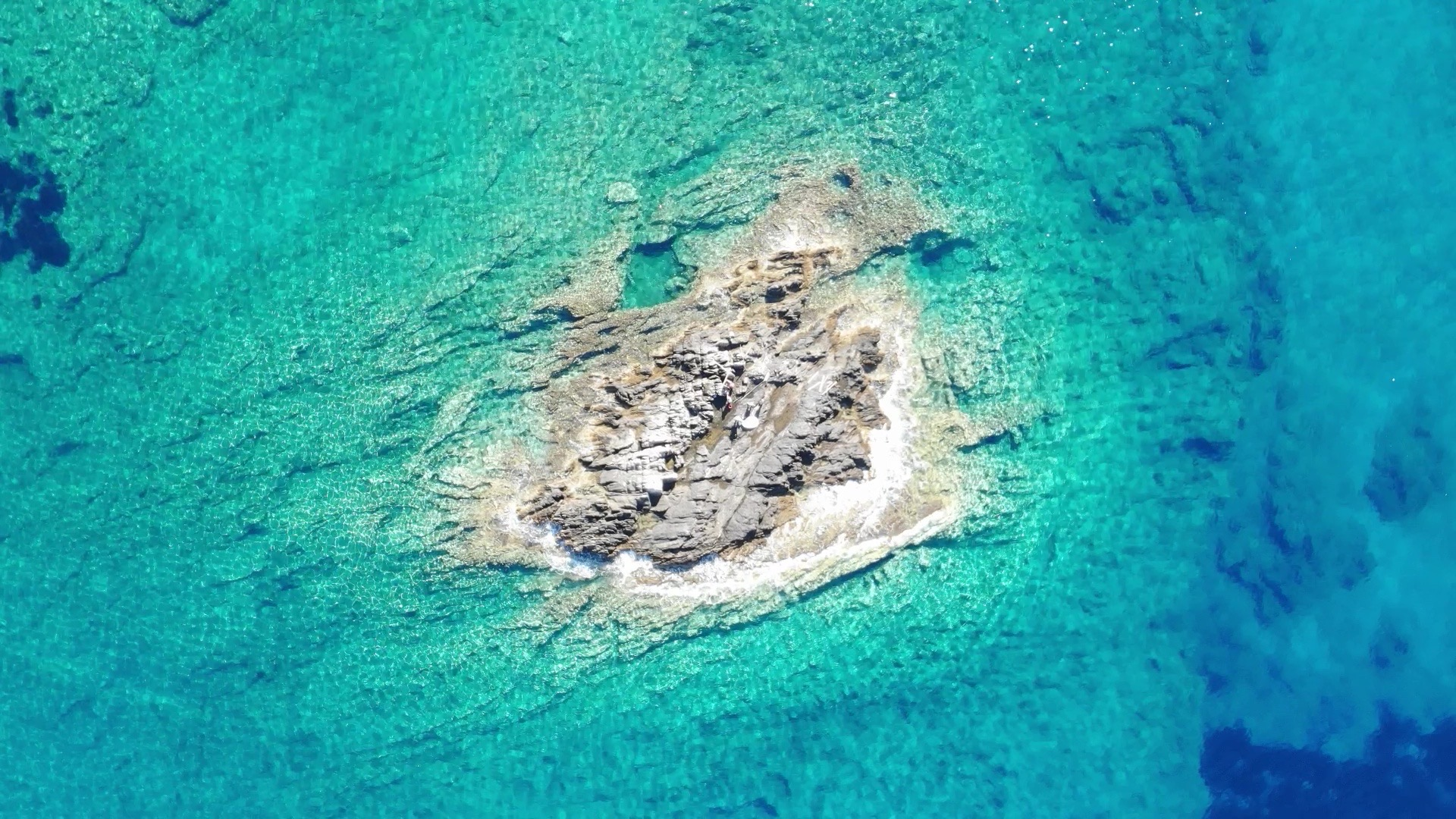
Pefnos island - drone photo

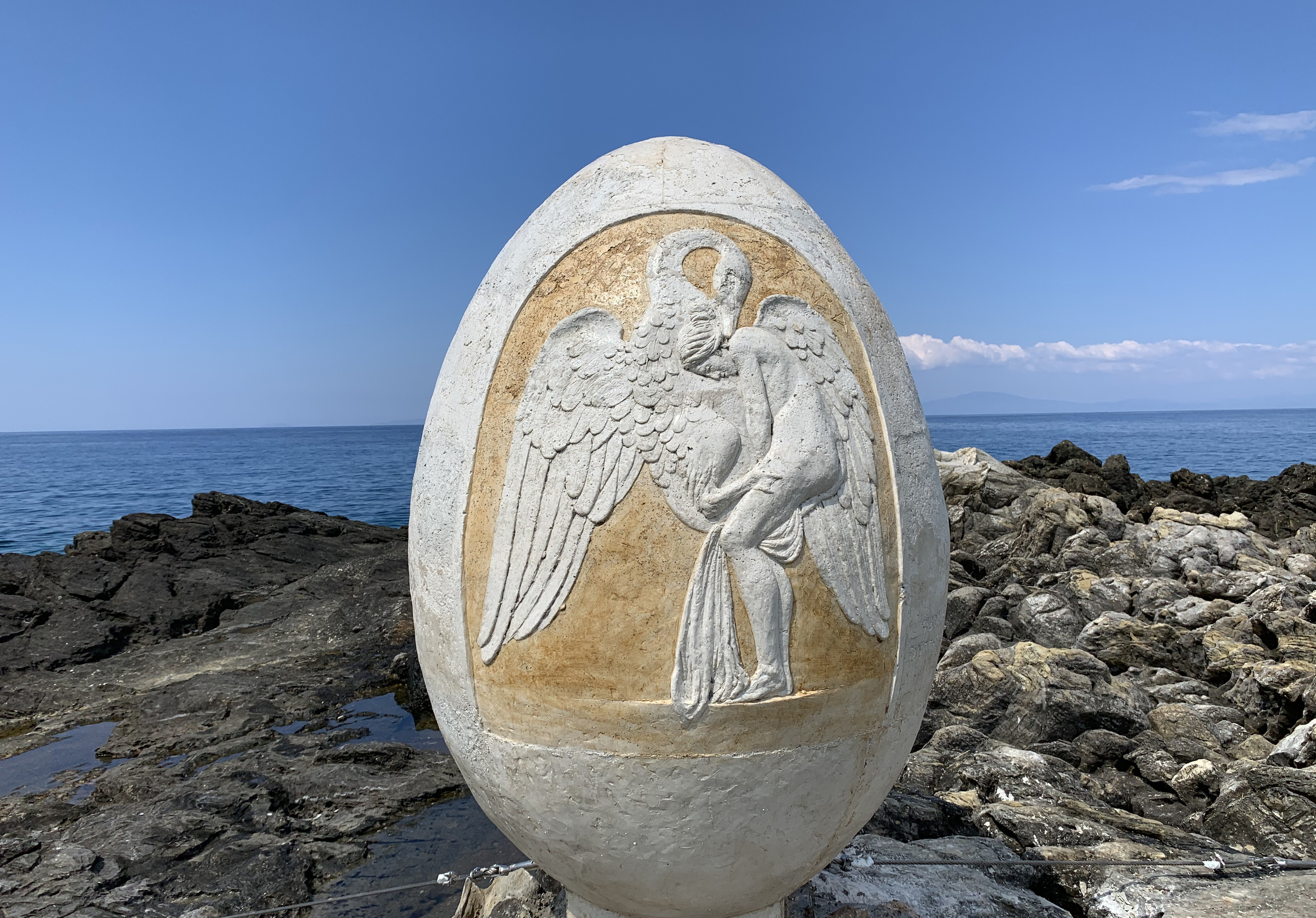
A statue of an egg placed on Pefnos island, depicting the union of Swan/Zeus with Leda, proposing that Helen of Troy was born on this island. The statue was inaugurated on August 22, 2020 from the Professor of Archaeology Petros Themelis and the Minister of Culture of Greece Lina Mendoni.

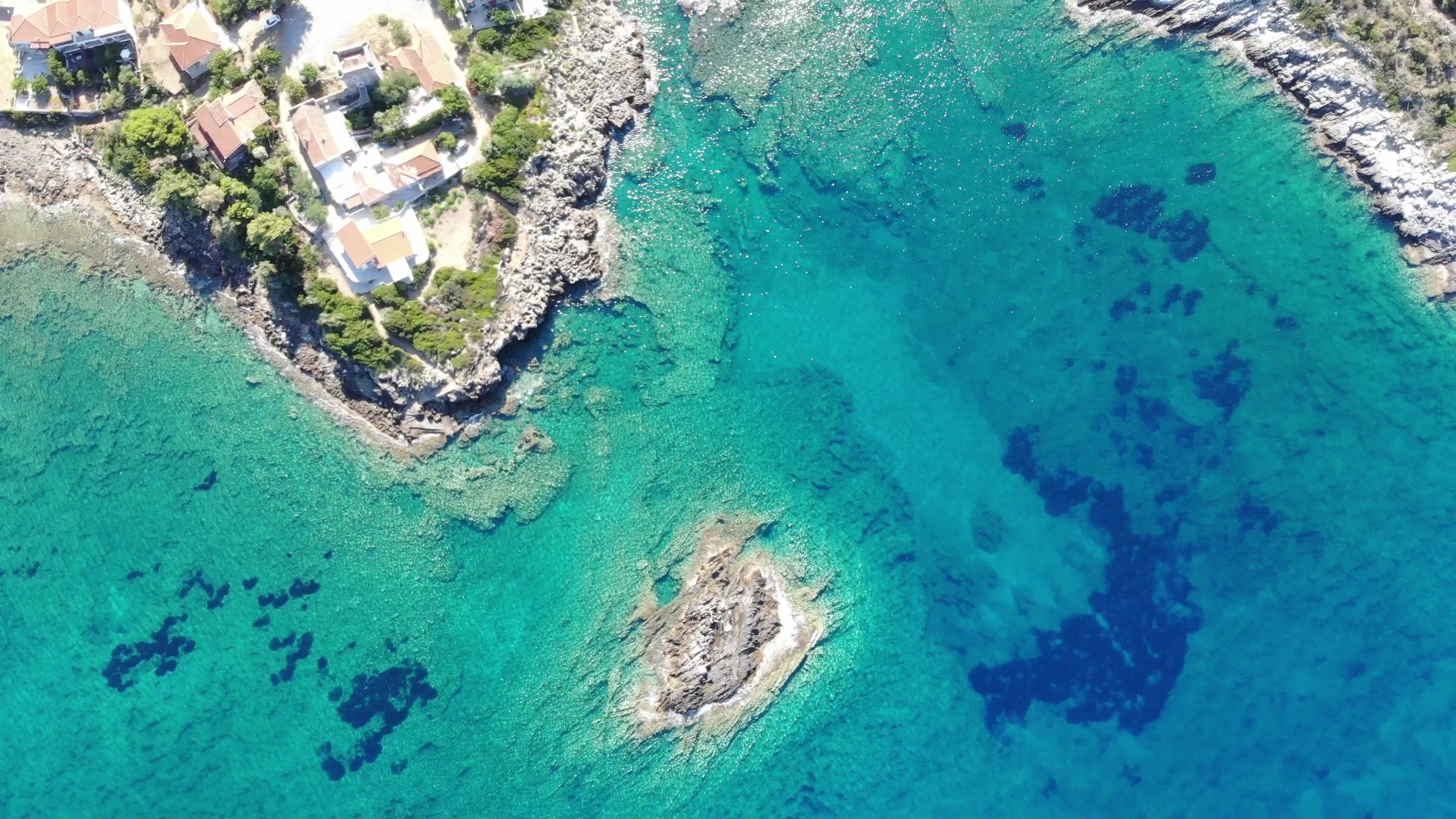
Pefnos island and Agios Dimitrios village

In July 2020 a statue of an egg was placed on the island, depicting the union of Zeus (transformed to a swan) with Leda and proposing that Helen of Troy was born on this island. The professor of classical archaeology Petros Themelis and the Minister of Culture and Sports of Greece Lina Mendoni stated that Helen of Troy was born on the island and inaugurated the statue at 22 August 2020.
