= Enopa =

Enopa may refer to:

- Carposina, a genus of moths
- Enopa (Greece), a town of ancient Messenia, Greece
