= Agios Nikolaos, Messenia =

Fishing village in Greece

Agios Nikolaos Άγιος Νικόλαος
- Community
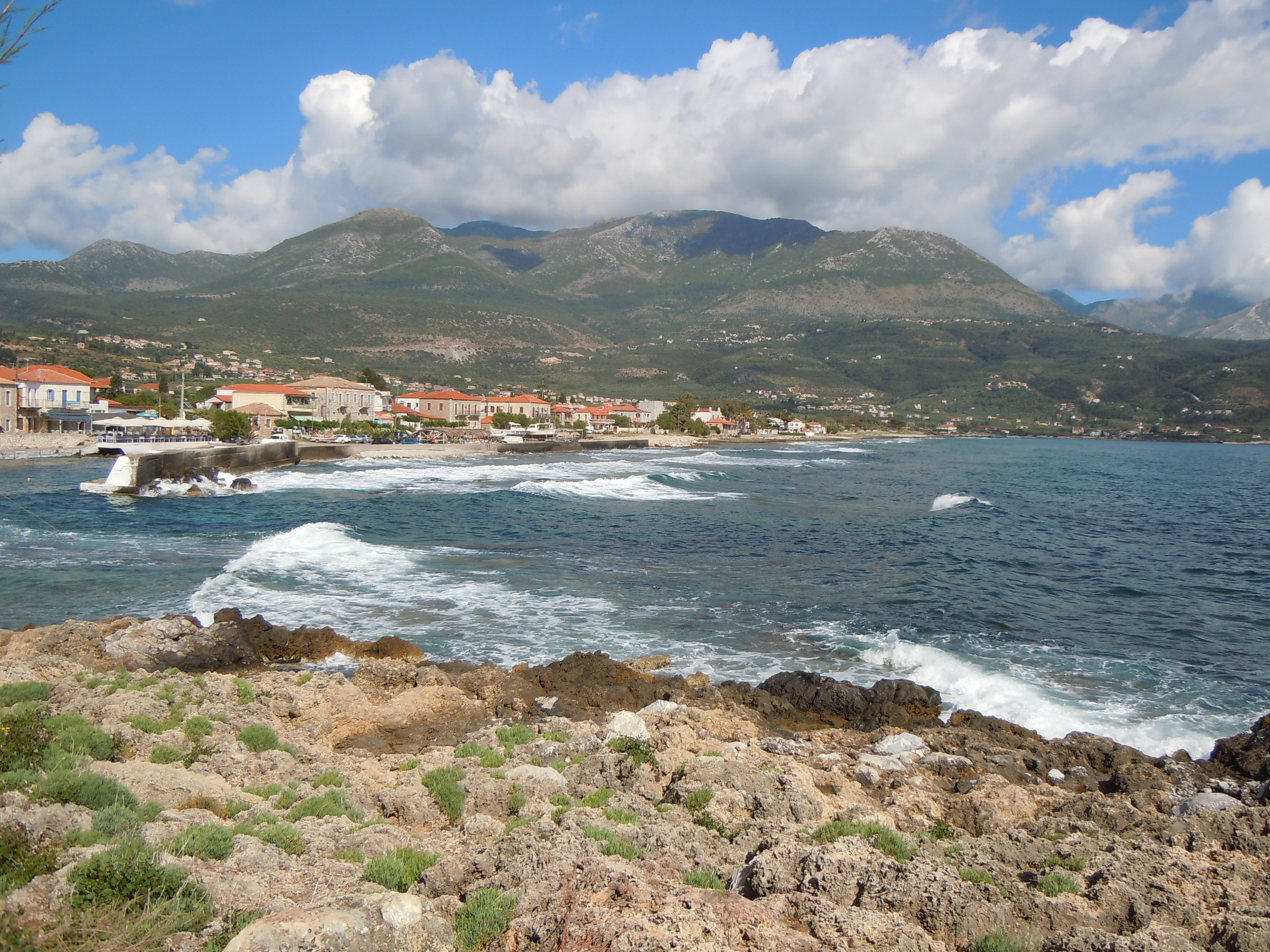
- Agios Nikolaos

- Location within Greece
- Coordinates: 36°49.45′N 22°16.85′E
- Country: Greece
- Administrative region: Peloponnese
- Regional unit: Messenia
- Municipality: West Mani
- Municipal unit: Lefktro
- Lowest elevation: 0 m (0 ft)

Population (2021)
  - Community: 425
- Time zone: UTC+2 (EET)
  - Summer (DST): UTC+3 (EEST)
- Postal code: 24024
- Area code: 27210
- Vehicle registration: KM
- Website: www.aghiosnikolaos-greece.com/en/

Aghios Nikolaos (Greek: Άγιος Νικόλαος Μεσσηνίας), Agios Nikolaos or Saint Nicholas, is a fishing village in the Mani Peninsula in southern Greece about 30 kilometres (19 mi) south-east of Kalamata, on the eastern shore of the Messenian Gulf, and about 4 kilometres (2.5 mi) south of Stoupa, a larger tourist village. It is part of the municipality of West Mani in Messenia.

There are Byzantine churches in the hills above the town.
