= Firesong =

2002 Book by William Nicholson

- Author: William Nicholson
- Cover artist: Mark Edwards
- Language: English
- Series: Wind on Fire Trilogy
- Genre: Children's Fantasy novel
- Publisher: Egmont
- Publication date: 28/05/2003
- Publication place: United Kingdom
- Media type: Print (Hardback & Paperback)
- Pages: 352 pp
- ISBN: 0-7868-0571-4
- OCLC: 50564871
- LC Class: PZ7.N5548 Fir 2002
- Preceded by: Slaves of the Mastery

Firesong is a 2002 fantasy novel by William Nicholson. It is the third and final book in the Wind On Fire trilogy.

== Plot summary ==
Firesong begins with the Manth people deliberating over what action to take, now that the Mastery is in ruins. After the defeat of the Master, alone and displaced, they seek a new homeland but have no real destination and very little food.

Ira Hath, descendant of Ira Manth, and a great prophetess who is also Kestrel and Bowman's mother, has a vision of the Manth people's true homeland. Throughout the book the Manth people travel with only Ira's guidance, and she becomes weaker as they go, knowing she will eventually die of prophecy.

Bowman eagerly awaits a summons from Sirene, and must prepare to sacrifice himself to save his people and the world. Before he is ready for this, however, he must be trained by the great Albard, the Master of the ruined Mastery. The journey is long, and his preparation is tough, especially in the hands of a strange teacher. Jumper, the man-woman Singer who can change forms and personalities to please people, has come for Bowman. Jumper agrees to let Kestrel, Bowman's sister, come along as well.

In the end it is revealed that Kestrel is the one who is destined to give her life, having picked up Albard's teachings along the way. Bowman is in fact the Meeting place- the point at which the great evil and the great kindness of the world will annihilate one another. This is because he was once one of the Zars, the army of the Morah (the "spirit" of all evil), and is one of the Singer people too, as he has been trained in their ways. Upon reaching the homeland, Ira's life ends, her destiny fulfilled. Kestrel, too, ends her life with all the other Singers, singing the firesong to destroy the Morah, give humanity a fresh start, and allow the Manth people to finally reach the homeland.

The epilogue, set some 8 years later, finds the Manth people established in their new home, with various people married and with young families. Amongst them are Bowman and Sisi (the princess of Gang, and Kestrel's best friend), who are now rulers of Gang due to Sisi's birthright. The ending sees Pinto and Mumpo betrothed, and the Manth people happy at last.

== Reception ==
Angus O'Brien of The Courier-Mail called the novel "well written and hard to put down", praising the plot and the characters. Deidre Baker of the Toronto Star wrote that Nicholson "has a vivid imagination and writes with fluidity, so that the episodes have their own momentum, intrigue and feeling." However, she also stated that the novel "suffers from a rather arbitrarily episodic plot." Tony Bradman of The Daily Telegraph found it to be a "disappointment" in spite of the "crisp professionalism" of the writing, opining that the novel's cities and landscapes "sometimes feel as if they have been called into being just to suit the plot" and that there is a "certain wooliness about the central conflict between good and evil."

== See also ==
- Aramanth
- The Wind Singer
- Slaves of the Mastery
- William Nicholson (writer)
