= Altomira =

Altomira Αλτομιρά
- Community
- Location within Greece
- Coordinates: 36°58′N 22°14′E
- Country: Greece
- Administrative region: Peloponnese
- Regional unit: Messenia
- Municipality: West Mani
- Municipal unit: Avia

Population (2021)
  - Community: 13
- Time zone: UTC+2 (EET)
  - Summer (DST): UTC+3 (EEST)
- Vehicle registration: KM

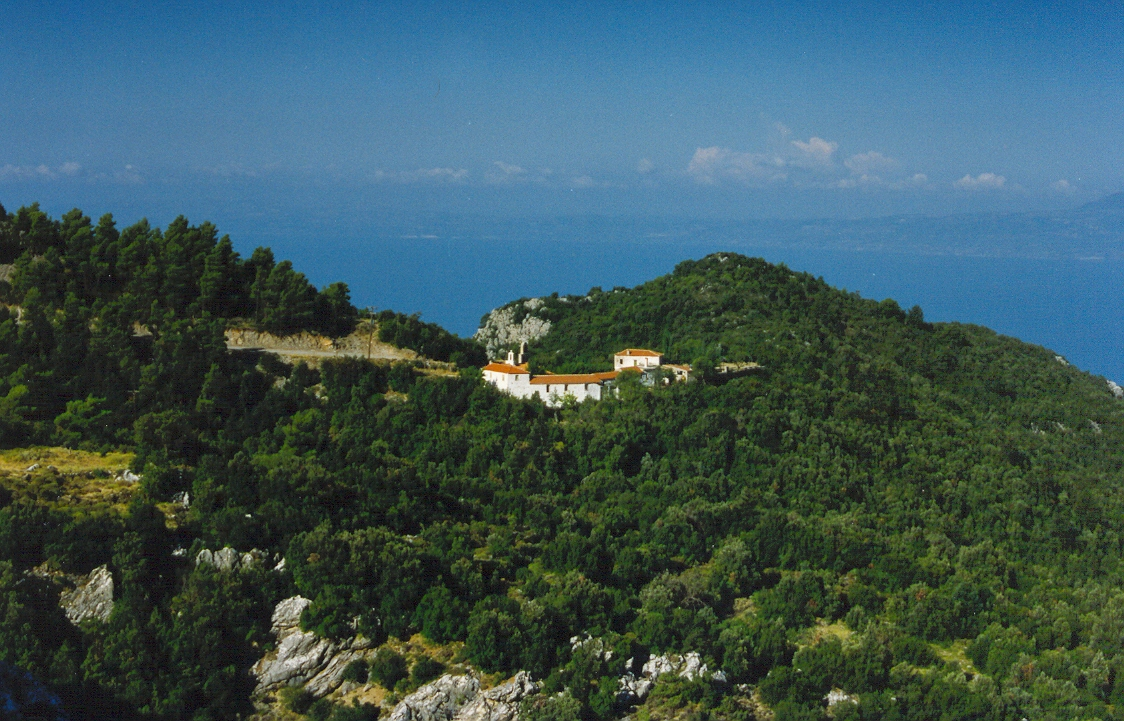

Altomira (Greek: Αλτομιρά) is a mountain village in the municipal unit of Avia, Messenia, Greece. It sits at 860 metres above sea level. Many of its residents only live here during the summer months. Altomira lies on the western slope of the Taygetus mountains, 7 km from the sea. It is 12 km southeast from Kalamata.

== Population ==
Year	Population
1879	364
1896	370
1920	211
1940	239
1951	19
1961	18
1981	107
2001	72
2011	47
2021	13

== History ==
Altomira was mentioned for the first time in 1618 with 20 families. After Greek independence, it was administratively part of the municipality of Gerinia and between 1841 and 1914 of the municipality Avia. Until 1998, when it became part of Avia again, it was an independent community.

== Sources ==
- Theodoros Belitsos Ta Altomira tis Exo Manis (Τα Αλτομιρά της Έξω Μάνης (Ιστορία-Οικογένειες-Τοπωνύμια) = Altomira in Outer Mani (History-Family-Toponyms), 1999

== See also ==
- List of settlements in Messenia
