= The Secret Intensity of Everyday Life =

2009 novel by William Nicholson

- First edition
- Author: William Nicholson
- Language: English
- Genre: Women's Fiction
- Publisher: Quercus Publishing
- Publication date: 2009
- Publication place: United Kingdom
- Media type: Print (Paperback & Hardback)
- Pages: 346
- ISBN: 978-1-84724-812-1 (Hardback) ISBN 978-1-84724-818-3 (Paperback)
- OCLC: 310157628

The Secret Intensity of Everyday Life is a novel by the British playwright, novelist and Oscar nominated screenwriter William Nicholson.

== Plot summary ==
Laura, the central character, lives happily enough with her husband and children, until a long forgotten lover comes back into her life. When her passion is re-awakened, she comes to realise how the excitement has faded from her life.

As the story unfolds we find that everyone in the Sussex village where the novel is set, lives with their own inner dramas. None of them seems to notice that she is going through a crisis. The hidden feelings of a large cast of characters are interwoven to form a plot that attempts to reveal the intensity with which ordinary lives are led.

The novel is multi-stranded, exploring the highs and lows of life. Sometimes serious and at others sublime, it attempts to answer the central question of how much happiness people should expect from life.
