= Lefktro =

Lefktro Λεύκτρο
- Municipal unit
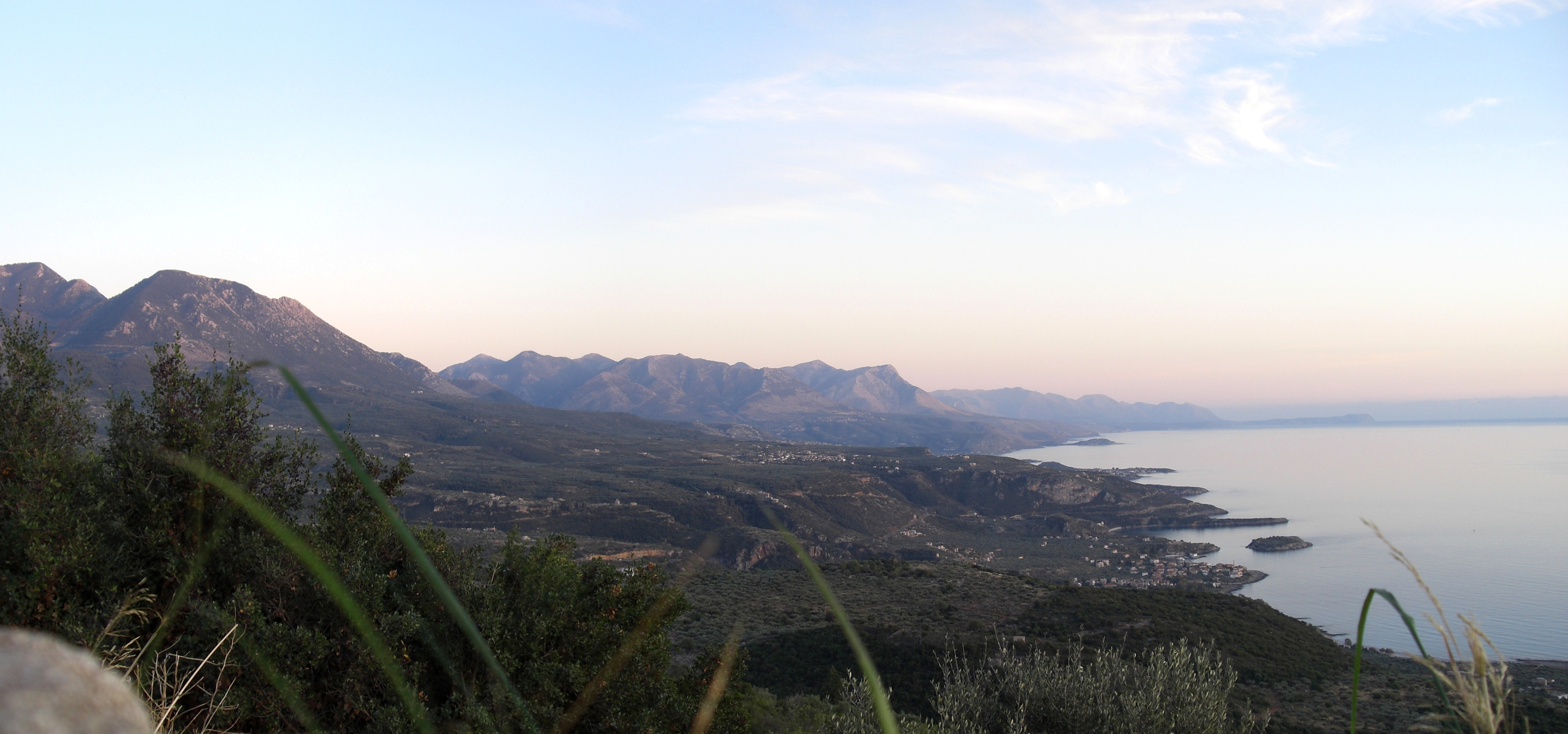
- View of Kardamyli

- Location within the regional unit

- Location within Greece
- Coordinates: 36°51′N 22°16′E
- Country: Greece
- Administrative region: Peloponnese
- Regional unit: Messenia
- Municipality: West Mani
- Districts: 19

Area
  - Municipal unit: 222.981 km^{2} (86.093 sq mi)
- Highest elevation: 1,300 m (4,300 ft)
- Lowest elevation: 0 m (0 ft)

Population (2021)
  - Municipal unit: 3,960
  - Municipal unit density: 17.8/km^{2} (46.0/sq mi)
- Time zone: UTC+2 (EET)
  - Summer (DST): UTC+3 (EEST)
- Postal code: 24022
- Area code: 2721
- Vehicle registration: KM
- Website: www.lefktro.gr/english/

Lefktro (Greek: Λεύκτρο) is a village and a former municipality in Messenia, Peloponnese, Greece. Since the 2011 local government reform it is part of the municipality West Mani, of which it is a municipal unit. The municipal unit has an area of 222.981 km^{2}. Its population is 4,699 (2011). The seat of the municipality was in Kardamyli. The village Lefktro is located above the larger village of Stoupa. Also known as Choriadaki (little town), it contains some restored Maniot tower houses and a few newer houses, virtually all built in the traditional style, of local stone. A ten-minute walk to the sea and Stoupa's beach, it is on the slopes leading up to the Taygetos mountains.

== Local communities ==
Community	English	Greek	Population (2021)
1	Agios Nikolaos	Άγιος Νικόλαος	425
2	Agios Nikon	Άγιος Νίκων	52
3	Exochori	Εξωχώρι	174
4	Thalames	Θαλάμες	110
5	Kardamyli	Καρδαμύλη	391
6	Karyovouni	Καρυοβούνι	32
7	Kastania	Καστανέα	78
8	Lagkada	Λαγκάδα	75
9	Milea	Μηλέα	134
10	Neochori	Νεοχώρι	1,311
11	Nomitsis	Νομιτσής	100
12	Platsa	Πλάτσα	221
13	Proastio	Προάστιο	256
14	Prosilio	Προσήλιο	170
15	Pyrgos	Πύργος	81
16	Rigklia	Ρίγκλια	186
17	Saidona	Σαϊδόνα	53
18	Trachila	Τραχήλα	18
19	Tseria	Τσέρια	93
Total			3,960
