= William Nicholson (writer) =

British screenwriter, playwright and novelist

William Nicholson OBE FRSL
- Born: William Benedict Nicholson; 12 January 1948 (age 78); Lewes, Sussex, England
- Education: Downside School; Christ's College
- Occupations: Screenwriter, playwright, and novelist
- Writing career
- Notable awards: Order of the British Empire; Nestlé Smarties Book Prize (2010)
- Website: www.williamnicholson.com

William Benedict Nicholson (born 12 January 1948) is a British screenwriter, playwright, and novelist who has been nominated twice for an Oscar.

== Early life ==
A native of Lewes, Sussex, William Nicholson was brought up in a Roman Catholic family (mother Hope Nicholson) on a farm in Hillesley, Gloucestershire. By the time he reached his tenth birthday he had decided to become a writer. As a teenager he founded, edited and contributed to The Hillesley Harvester, a local newsletter for his village. He was educated at Downside School, and Christ's College, Cambridge.

== Career ==
At the start of his career Nicholson worked for the BBC as a director of documentary films with numerous works to his credit between the mid-1970s and mid-1980s. He gained renown as a novelist and playwright when the first book of his popular Wind On Fire trilogy won the Blue Peter best book award and the Smarties Gold Award for Best Children's Book. He has written several novels and fantasy books.

He married author Virginia Nicholson (née Bell) in 1988.

== Other work ==
He has twice been nominated for Tony Awards for best play, for Shadowlands and The Retreat from Moscow. He also turned Shadowlands, based on the relationship between C. S. Lewis and Joy Gresham, into a BBC-TV play in 1985, and an acclaimed film in 1993. The latter starred Anthony Hopkins and Debra Winger and was directed by Richard Attenborough. Following screenplays included Nell (1994), First Knight (1995) and Grey Owl (1999). He later worked as a writer on the Academy Award winning epic Gladiator (2000), which had a very difficult production, and made his directorial debut with the 1997 film Firelight.

In 2007, Nicholson co-wrote Elizabeth: The Golden Age, from an earlier script by Michael Hirst. In 2012, Nicholson adapted the hit musical Les Misérables into a film directed by Tom Hooper. Following this, Nicholson would write several more historical dramas, such as Unbroken, Everest and Breathe. He directed another film, Hope Gap, in 2019.

=== Awards, nominations and honours ===
Nicholson's first nomination came in 1989 when BAFTA TV Awards included the 1987 teleplay Sweet as You Are, which he co-wrote with Ruth Caleb and Angela Pope, on its list of candidates for Best Single Drama. His next nominations were for 1994's Shadowlands, when he was a contender for both a BAFTA and an Oscar for Best Adapted Screenplay. 1997 was another successful year, with an Outstanding Writing for a Miniseries or a Special Emmy nomination for the 1996 TV drama Crime of the Century. He was also singled out at the San Sebastian International Film Festival for Firelight, with a nomination for the Golden Seashell Award and a win of the Special Prize of the Jury.

Nicholson was elected a Fellow of the Royal Society of Literature in 1999.

2000 turned out to be Nicholson's most impressive year to date, with acclaim for the Best Picture Oscar winner Gladiator. He had nominations for the Sierra Award from the Las Vegas Film Critics Society Awards and the Saturn Award from the Academy of Science Fiction, Fantasy and Horror Films, followed by Best Screenplay nominations from both BAFTA and Oscar.

He was appointed Officer of the Order of the British Empire (OBE) in the 2015 New Year Honours for services to drama and literature.

== Bibliography ==
=== Novels ===
==== Fantasy novels ====
- Wind On Fire trilogy
  - The Wind Singer
  - Slaves of the Mastery
  - Firesong
- Noble Warriors trilogy
  - Seeker (UK release 2005)
  - Jango (UK release 2006)
  - Noman (UK release 2007)

==== Other novels ====
- The Seventh Level, A Sexual Progress (1979)
- The Society of Others (UK release 2004)
- The Trial of True Love (UK release 2005)
- The Secret Intensity of Everyday Life (UK release 2009)
- Rich and Mad (UK release 2010)
- All The Hopeful Lovers (UK release 2010)
- Motherland (UK release 2013)
- Reckless (UK release 2014)
- The Lovers of Amherst (UK release 2015)
- Adventures in Modern Marriage (UK release 2022)

=== Stage plays ===
- Shadowlands (1989)
- The Retreat from Moscow (1989)

== Filmography ==
Year	Title	Director	Notes
1983	Martin Luther, Heretic	Norman Stone	Television film
1985	Shadowlands	Norman Stone	Television film
1990	The March	David Wheatley	Television film
1993	Shadowlands	Richard Attenborough	Nominated- Academy Award for Best Adapted Screenplay; Nominated- BAFTA Award for Best Adapted Screenplay
1994	Nell	Michael Apted	
1995	First Knight	Jerry Zucker	
1997	Firelight	Himself	Directorial debut
1999	Grey Owl	Richard Attenborough	
2000	Gladiator	Ridley Scott	Nominated- Academy Award for Best Original Screenplay; Nominated- BAFTA Award for Best Original Screenplay
2007	Elizabeth: The Golden Age	Shekhar Kapur	
2012	Les Misérables	Tom Hooper	
2013	Mandela: Long Walk to Freedom	Justin Chadwick	
2014	Unbroken	Angelina Jolie	
2015	Everest	Baltasar Kormákur	
2017	Breathe	Andy Serkis	
2019	Hope Gap	Himself	
2022	Thirteen Lives	Ron Howard	
