= Slaves of the Mastery =

2001 novel by William Nicholson

- Author: William Nicholson
- Cover artist: Mark Edwards
- Language: English
- Series: Wind on Fire trilogy
- Genre: Children's Fantasy novel
- Publisher: Egmont Press
- Publication date: 2001
- Publication place: United Kingdom
- Pages: 352 pp
- ISBN: 0-641-77780-9
- Preceded by: The Wind Singer
- Followed by: Firesong

Slaves of the Mastery is the second book in the Wind On Fire trilogy by William Nicholson. It picks up the story of twins Kestrel and Bowman five years on from the closing chapter of The Wind Singer. It was first published in 2001.

== Plot summary ==
Since events of The Wind Singer, the city of Aramanth is greatly changed. The walls have been torn down, and the poorer districts abandoned. It is no longer run by the strict system of exams; in fact, everyone is pleasant and docile. The change occurred because the city had been released from an evil force known as the Morah.

This new freedom, however, has also severely weakened the city. News of this reaches as far as a distant country known as the Mastery. The country sends an army of a thousand, commanded by young Marius Semeon Ortiz, to destroy the city and take its entire population as slaves. They do so, killing many of the city's residents and enslaving the others, except for Kestrel Hath. She vows revenge on the unknown Mastery, and on Ortiz himself, and begins to follow the trail of the returning army.

The Manth people are brought to the Mastery, a beautiful country built entirely by slave labor. They are branded and given jobs. Some of the people begin to enjoy work, discovering that every single person in the Mastery is a slave except for the Master himself. Hanno Hath, father of Kestrel, becomes a librarian, while his son Bowman becomes a night watchman in order to listen for his approaching sister.

Kestrel faints with exhaustion on her journey. She is rescued by the beautiful Sirharasi (Sisi), Johdila of Gang. As one of the few people who has seen Sisi unveiled, Kestrel becomes her servant and mutual friend. She discovers that Sisi is also travelling to the Mastery to marry Ortiz, the man who led the attack on Aramanth. Kestrel tries to use the considerable might of Gang's army, the Johjan Guards, to overthrow the Mastery, and she convinces Zohon, the Guards' conceited leader, that Sisi loves him, and that she will give him a sign to show this.

While on a night watch, Bowman is approached by an ancient, one-eyed hermit known as "Dogface", who tells Bowman that, as the son of the prophet (Bowman's mother, Ira Hath, is descended from the ancient prophet, Ira Manth), he has great powers that belong to the Singer people. Bowman tests these new powers by speaking with a cow, moving a stick without touching it, and later speaking to a cat, Mist, that Dogface leaves behind. Mist's ambition is to learn how to fly, but as Bowman's powers are initially limited and untested, he cannot teach Mist.

Meanwhile, Mumpo, another Manth slave, joins the Manaxa, a prestigious fight where two competitors attempt to stab each other with spiked armor until either one dies or is driven out of the arena. Mumpo shows considerable skill and, at the wedding, kills the reigning champion and heavy favourite.

At the wedding, Sisi and Ortiz both fall for people other than those intended, Sisi for Bowman and Ortiz for Kestrel, and chaos ensues. Zohon, believing he is rescuing Sisi from the Mastery, instigates a battle against Ortiz and his men; however, the entire population of the Mastery, bound by the Master's will, attacks and outnumbers Zohon's army. Mumpo begins searching for Kestrel to try to save her in the chaos, killing anyone he encounters whether they be Mastery citizens or Johjan guards. Bowman, using his psychic powers, engages in a mind duel with the Master. Kestrel and Ortiz enter. Bowman is temporarily distracted and the Master exploits this, commanding Ortiz to kill Kestrel. Despite his love for her, he is unable to resist the Master's will and obeys. With the sword centimeters from her heart, Bowman kills the Master and Ortiz is released from his will. Mumpo enters the room and sees Ortiz with his arms around Kestrel, and gets the wrong idea. Mumpo smashes Ortiz's head and breaks his neck. Released from his power, the Master's army dissipates and sets about destroying the city in a frenzy, and Zohon seizes control.

Finally free to leave, Ira Hath asserts that they must seek out the homeland, as "the wind is rising". Though many of the Manth people choose to stay and make a life for themselves, a small group resolve to trust in Ira's prophecy, and together along with Sisi and her servant Lunki, they set out in search of the homeland.

== Reception ==
James Delingpole of The Daily Telegraph called the novel "sophisticated, tightly drawn and gripping", writing that "some of its intellectual themes and political complexities are awfully grown up." The Guardian called it a "really good adventure" and a "thoughtful, imaginative and relentlessly readable novel touched by tenderness for the bravery and foolishness of human beings." Jennifer L. Branch of CM : Canadian Review of Materials called it a "gripping and suspenseful read" and praised the characterisation.
