= Enope (Greece) =

Enope or Enopa (Ancient Greek: Ἐνόπη) was a town of ancient Messenia. It was one of the seven Messenian cities that, according to Homer in the Iliad, were offered by Agamemnon to Achilles to assuage his anger and return to the siege of Troy.

Strabo mentions that there were diverse opinions on which was the place where the city of Enope was to be located: some located it in the city of Pellana; others, in a place near Cardamyle and others, in Gerenia. Pausanias, on the other hand, was among those who identified it with Gerenia, which is the location that current researchers consider most likely. However, there is no certainty to its precise location; the editors of the Barrington Atlas of the Greek and Roman World leave the town as unlocated.
