= Jango (novel) =

2006 book by William Nicholson

- First edition
- Author: William Nicholson
- Language: English
- Series: The Noble Warriors Trilogy
- Genre: Fantasy novel
- Publisher: Egmont Books
- Publication date: 4 September 2006
- Publication place: United Kingdom
- Media type: Print (hardback & paperback)
- Pages: 432 pp (first edition, hardback)
- ISBN: 978-1-4052-2422-2 (first edition, hardback)
- OCLC: 70264321
- Preceded by: Seeker
- Followed by: Noman

Jango (2006), is the second book in the Noble Warriors Trilogy, written by William Nicholson.

== The Noble Warriors ==
The Noble Warriors, or Nomana, are members of a religious community called the Nom. The Nom was formed by a great warlord, Noman, to protect their God, The All and Only. The All and Only has many other names: the Lost Child, the Loving Mother, the Wounded Warrior and the Wise Father. The God lives in the Garden, located on the island of Anacrea, until it is destroyed, when we find that there are multiple gardens.

The Noble Warriors do not use weapons or armour; they use only true strength, which is also called Lir. The vow of the noble warriors (which Noman wrote) says they cannot fight wars or conquer land or empires. They cannot love any person above all others, build a lasting home, or possess anything, but can only use their powers to bring freedom to the enslaved and justice to the oppressed.

== Plot summary ==
Jango begins with Seeker, Morning Star and Wildman who are all being taught in the Nom and are near the end of their training. Their teacher, Chance, mentions the secret skill of a Noble Warrior, and tells them a new teacher will be assigned to them to help them attain this secret skill. He then hands them over to Miriander, who puts them through training to learn how to control another's will by using lir. Once this training is over, it is discovered that Seeker has power without limits. Unlike the other Noble Warriors, he is able to suck the lir out of any living thing and doesn't get weary doing so. He fights and defeats Chance. Afterwards, he is told to stay in one place while the Elder and the council of the Nomana decide what to do with him, as they feel that they should not loose such power in the world, yet he might be the one the save the Nomana.

In the trees of the forest called the Glimmen lives Echo Kittle who is described as being pale, slender and beautiful. She is captured by the Orlan leader, Amroth Jahan, who intends to arrange a marriage between her and one of his sons. She refuses to do so until the Jahan threatens to burn down the Glimmen and kill everyone in it. She decides to go along with them and soon they arrive in Radiance, which is led by Soren Similin. After a series of events taking up more than half the book, Similin manages to form an alliance between the Jahan and Radiance so they can destroy Anacrea with the use of charged water, which has huge explosive power. Neither the Jahan or Radiance intends to share the victory with the other.

In his cell, Seeker is told by a Noma, Narrow Path, that the council of the Nom has decided to cleanse Seeker. Narrow Path believes this is the wrong decision and, knowing that he himself will be cleansed for this act, sets Seeker free, and tells him that he must go and fight the true threat; the Savanters, whom live in the land cloud. Seeker heads off to the land cloud, which is on the opposite side of the Glimmen, and on the way there he meets Jango sitting by a strange door in a broken down wall. At first, Jango seems to be a crazy old man, until he begins citing many of Seeker's personal thoughts. He gives Seeker much cryptic advice on how to defeat the Savanters and cites Noman's famous quote. (see Noman's experiment).

Seeker continues on his way through the Glimmen but is stopped by Echo Kittle who has escaped from the Orlans in Radiance. She pleads with Seeker to help her defend the Glimmen from the Orlans but Seeker, knowing that he has little time left, refuses and carries on his way into the land cloud. There he kills five out of seven savanters but he is told to go back by a black figure, pretending to be his shadow. Seeker feels that something bad is happening at the Nom so he runs back as fast as he can.

When Seeker arrives back at the Nom, the army of Orlans has already attacked and the charged water bomb ready to blow up the city, although Seeker doesn't know this. Seeker drives his power into the ground, causing an earthquake that stopped the battle in an instant, but the charged water bomb had already been launched at Anacrea and destroyed it, along with the Garden and the Lost Child. Seeker gets angry and takes revenge on the Jahan by breaking his pride, forcing him to kneel to Echo Kittle. The army of Orlans breaks up and Soren Similin dies from a charged water explosion. Seeker heads out in search of a purpose and runs across Jango, who is standing before a door. Jango says the door is open and he can enter if he wishes. Before he enters, he is told by Jango that there are many more Noms, and so he realises the All and Only is not dead. The book is ended when Seeker enters the strange door next to Jango and enters an exact replica of the Nom's Garden that he was used to. He kneels down and asks for forgiveness for disbelieving in him after the destruction of the Nom.

== See also ==
- Noble Warriors Trilogy
- Noman
- Seeker
- William Nicholson
