= Zarnata =

Ottoman-era castle in southern Greece

Coordinates: 36°56′04″N 22°11′42″E

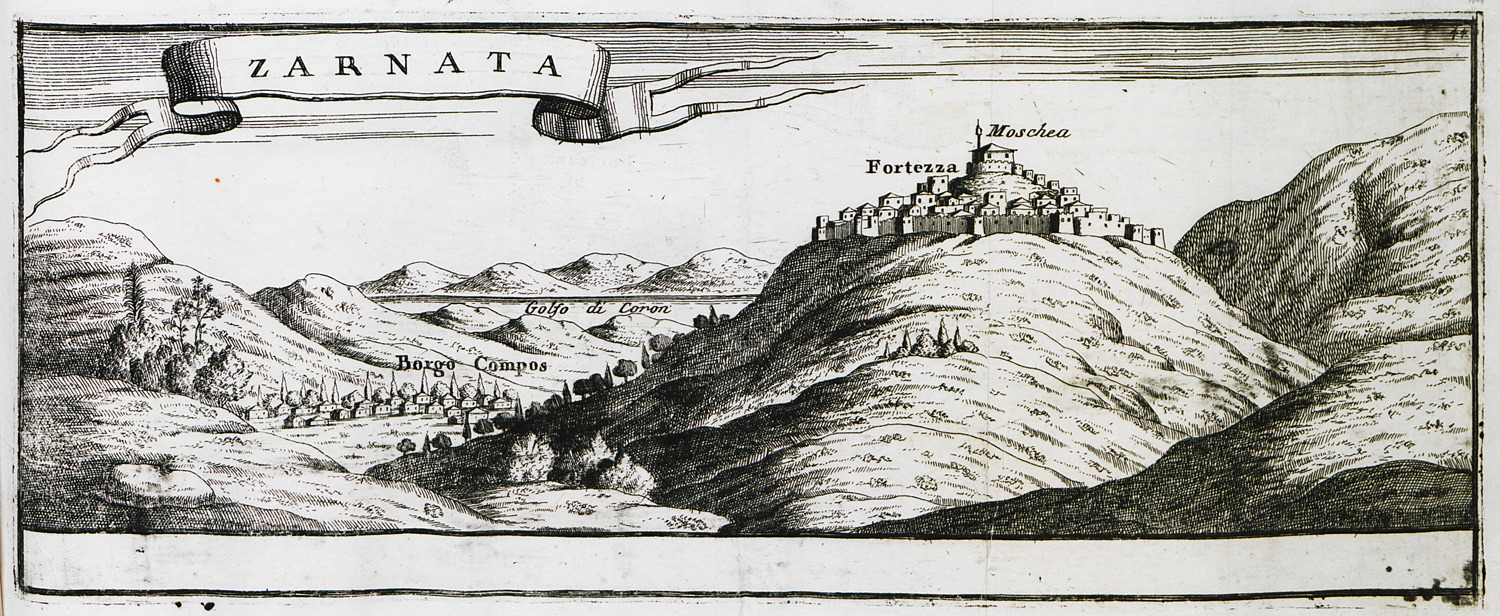
View of the castle of Zarnata and the village of Kampos in the 1680s, engraving by Vincenzo Coronelli

Zarnata Castle (Greek: Κάστρο Ζαρνάτας) is a ruined Ottoman-era castle in the Mani Peninsula in southern Greece.

== History ==
Zarnata is first mentioned in a Venetian document in 1278, and again in 1428, among the territories of Constantine Palaiologos. During the civil wars of the Despotate of the Morea that led to its conquest by the Ottoman Empire, Zarnata belonged to Demetrios Palaiologos, but was captured by his brother, Thomas. In later times, it was of some prominence as the seat of a metropolitan bishopric, and a site that played a part in the early stages of the Morean War (1684–1699). The castle itself, however, is dated by historians to the period from the 15th to late 17th centuries. Venetian sources from the period during and after the Morean War state that it—and neighbouring Kelefa—was built by the Turks to keep rebellious Maniots in check; possibly Zarnata was one of the three forts built for this purpose in 1670 by Grand Vizier Köprülüzade Fazıl Ahmed Pasha. Although Venetian commentators considered it small and of little significance, its Ottoman garrison resisted stoutly in 1685, and in 1701 it was counted among the more significant fortresses of the Venetian "Kingdom of the Morea". During the Ottoman reconquest of the Morea in 1715, however, the castle was abandoned without resistance.

== Description ==
The castle is located on a small isolated hill between the modern villages of Kampos and Stavropigio, in the northern part of Messenian Mani, at a strategic location that controlled the passages from the coast to the interior of Mani. It comprises a small circular fortified enclosure, apparently following the traces of a Hellenistic fortification, most likely to be identified with the acropolis of Gerenia. True to its function as a frontier outpost designed to keep watch over a subject population, it has neither a ditch nor platforms for artillery guns. Indeed, apart from the northeastern side, where the castle has a dominating position over the valley of Kampos, on the other sides, it is exposed to fire from nearby high ground. The circuit wall, built of irregular stone masonry mixed with brick, survives only up to a limited height, although in places still up to 30 feet (9.1 m); it follows the terrain closely and features circular and square towers. A large section of the wall, including the Hellenistic foundations, were torn away in the 1940s, during the civil wars in Greece, when the population of the neighbouring villages fled to the castle for safety and installed barbed wire enclosures instead.

At the top of the hill is a residential tower complex which likely dates to the late 18th century, serving as the seat of one of the four captaincies (καπετανάτα) into which Mani was divided. It comprises a three-story square tower of some 50 feet (15 m) in height, several auxiliary buildings, cisterns, a ruined windmill, as well as two churches, one dedicated to Saint Nicholas, and one to the Life-giving Spring (Zoodochos Pigi).

== Sources ==
- Andrews, Kevin (1978) [1953]. Castles of the Morea. Amsterdam: Adolf M. Hakkert. ISBN 90-256-0794-2.
- Bon, Antoine (1969). La Morée franque. Recherches historiques, topographiques et archéologiques sur la principauté d'Achaïe [The Frankish Morea. Historical, Topographic and Archaeological Studies on the Principality of Achaea] (in French). Paris: De Boccard. OCLC 869621129.
