= I.R.A. (band) =

Colombian hardcore punk band

I.R.A. is a Colombian hardcore punk band from Medellín, Antioquia Department, in Colombia. It was formed in 1985 by David Viola (at present, guitarist and vocalist of the band) and some of his friends who have already left the band. It is one of the oldest bands to still exist in Medellín, thanks to the perseverance of David Viola. Its long career and recent tours in the United States have made it one of the most important and popular punk bands in Medellín and Colombia. In their songs, they talk about, and criticize, the actual situation of Colombia and the world, and also the life and feelings of the people in this situation.

== History ==
I.R.A. was formed in the fall of 1986, under the name S.I.D.A. ("Sucios y Desordenados Anarkistas") ("Dirty and wild Anarchists"), by a group of friends that used to meet in the El Poblado park in Medellín. The band was formed at that time by: Yoryi on the drums, José R on the bass, José Juan on the guitar and Viola, as the vocalist.

They started rehearsing at the house of a friend, but were soon thrown out because of the noise and disorder of the public that attended the rehearsals; they then began to rent one of the first rehearsing places that existed in Medellín. The quality of the sound was bad. Still, it was one of the few options that the band had in order to continue.

In 1986 they changed the name of the band to I.R.A., for Ideas de Revolución Adolescente (Adolescent Ideas of Revolution). By this time, they found other places to rehearse, friends' houses and abandoned places, but those rehearsals had little or no public access, in hopes of avoid problems.

In 1989, the band performed for the first time, in the La Visitación neighborhood of Medellín. The same year, the band recorded its first work at Chava Bluss Studios: Barkizidio, a 7" EP with nine songs.

In 1990, Jose Juan, who used to hang out in Poblado park and walk down the streets all around the city, rented a house with his buddy Chozas. The Punk House became the place where the Medellins underground scene survived and grew strong during the violent times of the narcoterrorist war. The band had several performances. In these, they played alongside some of the most important underground bands of that time: B.S.N. (Bastardos Sin Nombre), Dexconcierto, Reencarnación, Crimen Impune, C.T.C., Nada, Antioquia Podrida, Ataque de Sonido and others. That same year Yoryi (drums) left the band and was replaced by Marcelo. Also, the band performed outside Antioquia for the first time in a performance in Pereira, Risaralda, organized by the punks of a neighborhood of that city.

In 1991 at Raimond Records Studio, the band recorded its second EP, Atentado Terrorista, which contained eight songs, with bass sounds recorded by Viola, replacing Jose R.

In 1993, the line-up changed again; new drummer Kamel replaced Josesito, who replaced Marcelo in 1992; Federico also joined the band as a bassist, Mónica sang backup in some choruses and a sang a couple of tunes as well. Viola continued to do the vocals and José Juan, the guitar. With this line-up the band recorded the LP Impotable Diversión. They also did a tour in Ecuador, where they performed in Quito, Ambato, and Cuenca.

In 1996 at Pussy Music studios, the band recorded its first album on CD, Crónicas de una década podrida, containing 26 of their songs composed between 1986 and 1996; it was released at the Palacio de los Eventos of Medellín, at a performance where they appeared alongside the band Neus.

In 1997, José Juan left the band and was replaced by Federico, who was replaced on the bass by Cabe; Kamel also left and was replaced by Aníbal; with this line-up, the band went to Venezuela, there they played at the Poliedro in Caracas; later on, during that same year, Federico also left the band and was replaced by Viola.

In 1998, the band recorded three songs for the compilation Ideas encontradas, produced by Sin Piedad Records. The same year, more players left the band: Aníbal was replaced by Fredy, and Cabe was replaced by Gabriel. With this line-up, the band recorded its second album on TKG Records and Organic Sound, Entre amigos. On this album, José Juan, a founder of the band who had left in the previous year, returned to play the guitar, but only as a guest musician.

In 1999, the band played in "Rockatón", a concert to raise funds for the people affected by the earthquake in the "Coffee Region" of Colombia (Caldas, Quindío, and Risaralda).

In 2000, Fredy left the band and was replaced by Mónica. The same year, the band performed alongside bands like:

- Fértil Miseria
- La Zorra
- Ácido Folklórico
- Coffee Makers
- Dumka Diskantus
- 2 Minutos
- 911
- Tr3s de Corazón
- Mojiganga
- Grito
- 5 de Menos
- Tres Hombres
- La Siembra

In 2003, at El Pez studios, they recorded their third album: Epidemia de Infexion Respiratoria Aguda. This album contained 14 new songs, 14 new versions of old songs and nine songs recorded live; alongside the album the band released its first video, of the song Lo que ustedes se merecen (What you deserve). The band also did a short tour in Colombia, performing in Medellín, Bogotá and Cali simultaneously with the release of the album in these cities. Later the same year the band released its second video, of the song Neurona (Nerve cell).

In March and April 2004, the band toured the United States, there they had fifteen performances in Boston, Baltimore, New York City (where they performed in the famous CBGB, and during which the band recorded a live album), New Jersey, Miami (where they filmed the video of the song Explotados ("Exploited")), Monterrey, Berkeley and San Francisco. When the band returned to Colombia, they began a new tour through Colombia, performing in Bogotá, Cali, Manizales, Ibagué, Bucaramanga, Armenia, Rionegro and Medellín where they performed alongside the American band Molotov Cocktail. In December they played in the Altavoz Festival 2004, in a performance in the bullring La Macarena of Medellín. The band also recorded its fourth album Décadas de libertad which would be released the next year.

In March 2005, the band played at the Ancón Festival 2005. Later, the band performed in Ecuador and Venezuela. After returning to Colombia they released their new album, Décadas de libertad and a documentary film about the band: Documentira. In June of the same year the band began a new tour through the United States, releasing there their new album and performing in several cities, including again CBGB in New York, and they filmed the video of the song Vivir para esto ("Live for This") in Miami. In August, after returning from the United States, Gabriel leaves the band. Mónica and Viola decided not to replace him and to invite other musicians to play the bass in live performances and future album recordings.

== Line-up ==
=== Actual line-up ===
- Mónica - vocals-drums
- David Viola - Vocals-guitar
- Duván - bass

=== Other people that played in the band ===
- Yoryi: Drums (1985–1990)
- José R: Bass (1985–1993)
- José Juan: Guitar (1985–1997)
- Marcelo: Drums (1990–1992)
- Josesito: Drums (1992–1993)
- Federico: Bass (1993–1997), guitar (1997)
- Kamel: Drums (1993–1997)
- Cabe: Bass (1997–1998)
- Aníbal: Drums (1997–1998)
- Gabriel: Bass (1998–2005
- Fredy: Drums (1998–2000)
- Harry: U.S Tour( ?????)

== Discography ==
=== EPs ===
- Barkizidio, 1989
- Atentado terrorista, 1991
- Split with Peaceful Protest (Japan), 2000
- Side by Side, split with Hellhounds (Miami), 2006

=== Albums ===
- Impotable diversion (LP), 1993
- Crónicas de una década podrida, 1996
- Entre amigos, 1998
- Epidemia de infexion respiratoria aguda, 2003
- Décadas de libertad, 2005

=== Compilations ===
- Ideas encontradas, 1998
- Punk Will Never Die, 1994
- Rock subterráneo contra el quinto centenario, 1992
- Clash World
- Angustía
