= Ira, Republic of Bashkortostan =

Ira Ира
- Selo
- Location within Bashkortostan Location within Russia
- Coordinates: 52°51′N 55°55′E
- Country: Russia
- Region: Bashkortostan
- District: Kumertau

Area
  - Total: 1.05 km^{2} (0.41 sq mi)

Population (2010)
  - Total: 559
  - Density: 532/km^{2} (1,380/sq mi)
- Time zone: UTC+5:00

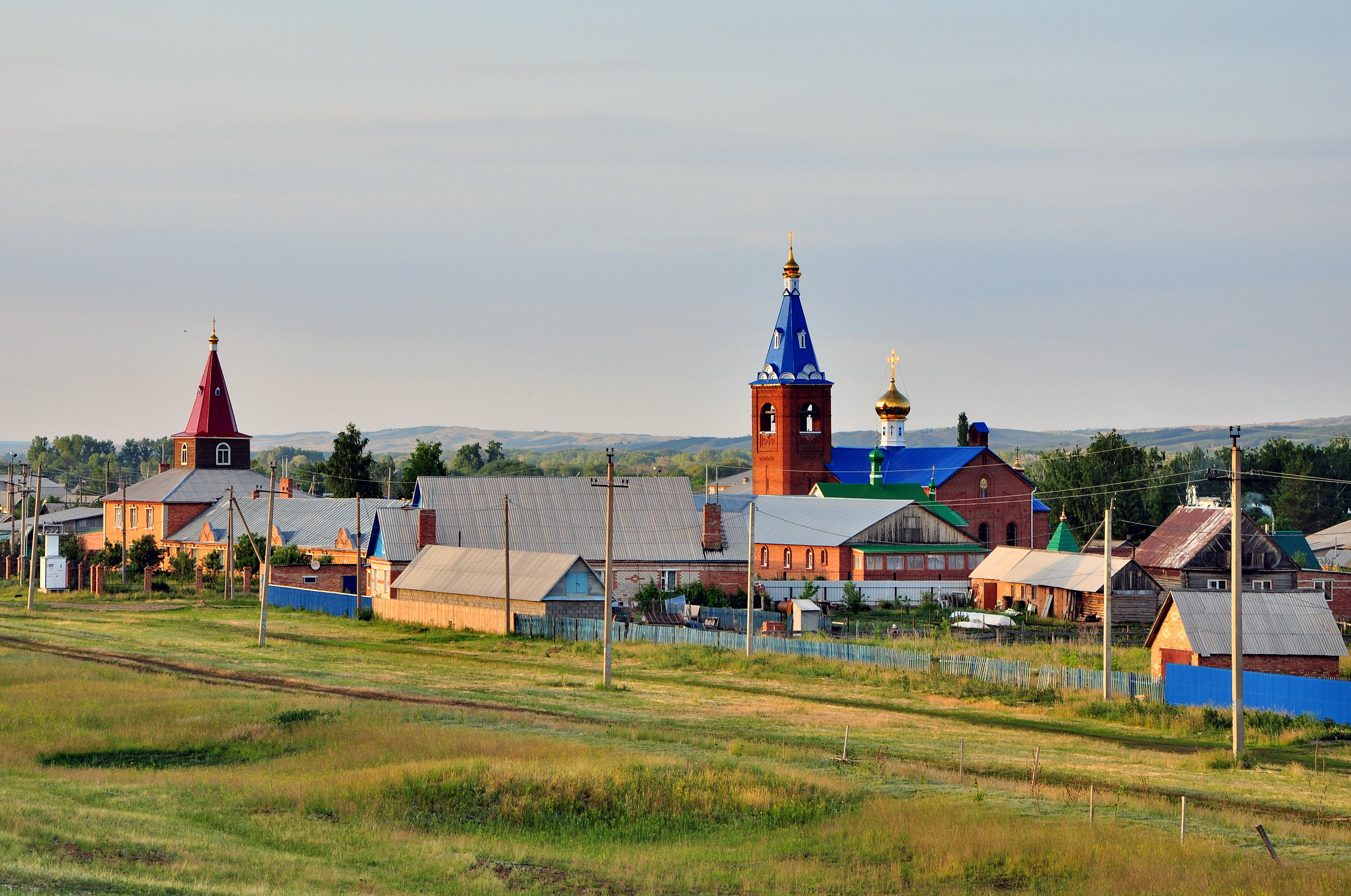
Monastery in the village of Ira Bashkortostan

Ira (Russian: Ира; Bashkir: Ира, İra) is a rural locality (a selo) in Kumertau, Bashkortostan, Russia. The population was 559 as of 2010. There are 6 streets.

== Geography ==
Ira is located 17 km northeast of Kumertau. Pchelka is the nearest rural locality.
