= Cardamyle =

Town of ancient Messenia

Coordinates: 36°53′05″N 22°14′16″E

Cardamyle or Kardamyle (Ancient Greek: Καρδαμύλη) was a town of ancient Messenia. It is mentioned by Homer in the Iliad as one of the seven places offered by Agamemnon to Achilles. It was situated on a strong rocky height at the distance of seven stadia from the sea, and sixty from Leuctra. It is called a Laconian town by Herodotus, since the whole of Messenia was included in the territories of Laconia at the time of the historian. It again became a town of Messenia on the restoration of the independence of the latter; but it was finally separated from Messenia by Augustus, and annexed to Laconia. Pausanias mentions at Cardamyle sanctuaries of Athena and of Apollo Carneius; and in the neighbourhood of the town a temenos of the Nereids.

Its site is located northeast the modern Kardamyli, at the distance of 1,300 metres (4,300 ft) from the sea, where there are considerable ruins of the town.
