= Eira (Messenia) =

Fortified settlement in the north of ancient Messenia

Coordinates: 37°23′54″N 21°55′41″E

Eira (Ancient Greek: Εἶρα), also known as Hira or Ira (Ἰρά), and Hire or Ire (Ἱρὴ), was a fortified settlement on a mountain of the same name, in the north of ancient Messenia, near the Neda River. During the Second Messenian War the Messenians fortified the place, and Aristomenes defended it for ten years against the Spartans. Pausanias dates the capture of the city by the Lacedaemonians to the first year of the 28th Olympiad (668 BCE). The Arcadians welcomed many Messenians who withdrew thither after the capture of Eira, while the captured Messenian prisoners were converted to helots by the Lacedaemonians, and the rest of Messenians who lived on the coast were exiled to Cyllene, in Elis. Pausanias adds that 297 years after the capture of Eira, in the third year of the 102nd Olympiad (370 BCE), the Messenians regained their territory.

Pausanias mentions the possibility that the city of Abia anciently had the name of Ιρή (Ire), the city cited by Homer, but seems to distinguish this Ιρή from the Eira of he recounts in the Second Messian War.

Its site is located near the modern Kakaletri, between it and Stasimo. On Mount Tetrazi, located near Andania and the Neda River, there are remains that some have identified with Eira.
