= Stoupa =

Stoupa Στούπα
- Settlement
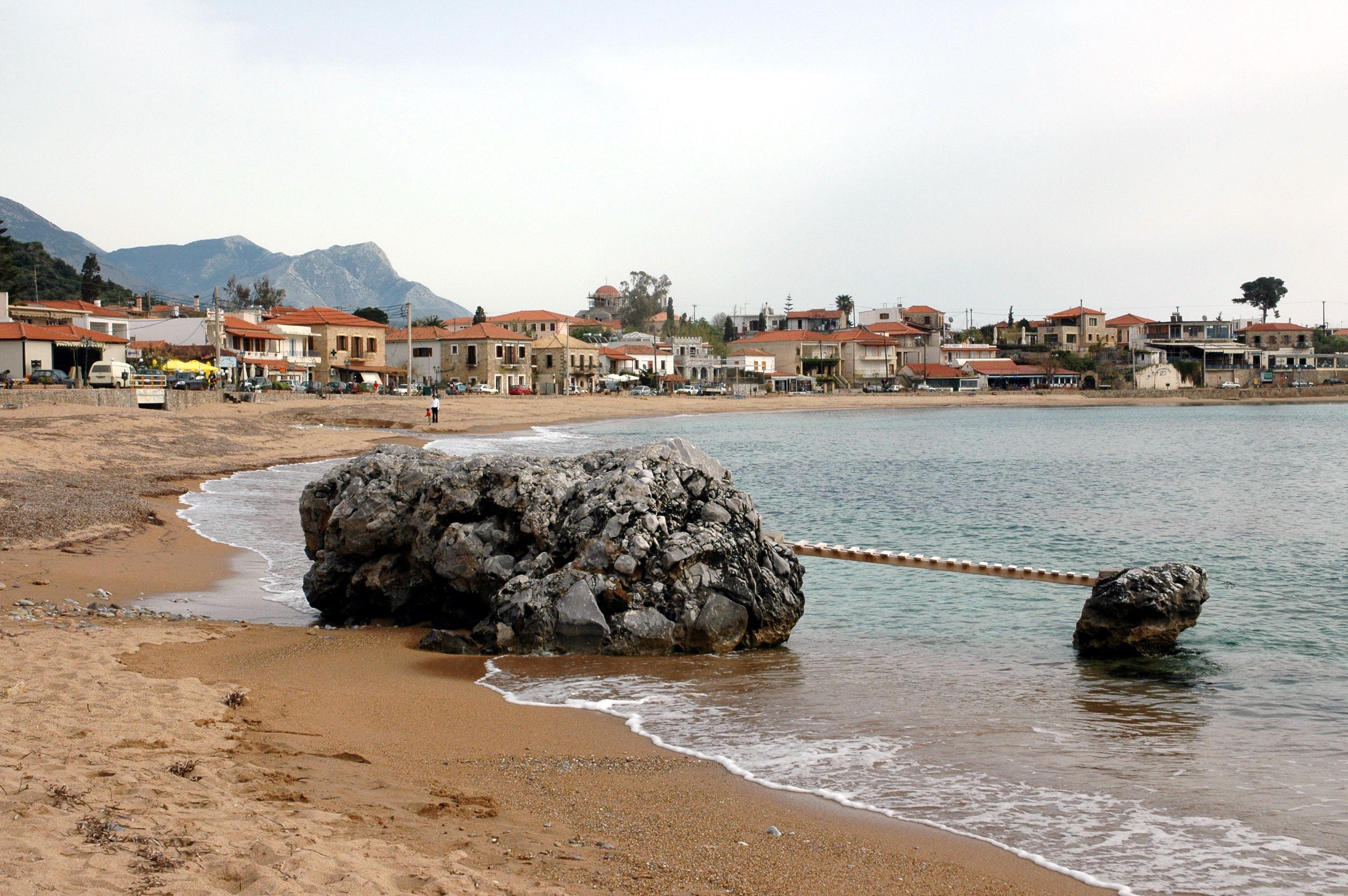
- Stoupa beach

- Location within Greece
- Coordinates: 36°50.65′N 22°15.58′E
- Country: Greece
- Administrative region: Peloponnese
- Regional unit: Messenia
- Municipality: West Mani
- Municipal unit: Lefktro
- Community: Neochori
- Elevation: 10 m (33 ft)

Population (2021)
  - Total: 638
- Time zone: UTC+2 (EET)
  - Summer (DST): UTC+3 (EEST)
- Postal code: 24024
- Area code: 27210
- Vehicle registration: KM
- Website: www.stoupa-greece.com/en/

Stoupa (Greek: Στούπα) is a village on the coast of the southern Peloponnese peninsula in Greece. It is part of the municipal unit of Lefktro within the municipality of West Mani, in Messenia and the historic region of Mani Peninsula.

Stoupa's economy is oriented towards tourism.

== Geography ==
Stoupa is located in the region traditionally known as Outer Mani. Approximately 4 kilometres (2 mi) from Stoupa is the village of Agios Nikolaos, a working fishing village. Above Agios Nikolaos is the small village of Riglia. Other nearby settlements include Oitylo (32 kilometres or 20 miles), Limeni (36 kilometres or 22 miles) and Areopoli (40 kilometres or 25 miles). Below Areopoli are the caves of Pirgos Dirou.

Kalogria, a beach just outside Stoupa

Beaches and coves around the area include Stoupa and Kalogria, both of which feature underground freshwater springs. Many locations of submarine groundwater discharge (SGD) are easily visible on the sea surface around the bay. The largest groundwater source is located about 100 metres (330 ft) offshore, with two strong SGDs emanating from fissures in the bedrock at roughly 25 metres (82 ft) in depth.

== Landmarks ==
The Frankokratia-era Leuktron Castle, constructed 1248-1249, is sited on a hill in Stoupa. It was built when Stoupa was part of the Principality of Achaea to subdue the Melingoi tribes of nearby Mount Taygetus.

There is a bust of modern Greek author Nikos Kazantzakis (1883 – 1957) on a cliff overlooking Kalogria beach. The protagonist of his celebrated 1946 novel Zorba the Greek was based on a real-life acquaintance from Stoupa.
