= Kampos, Messenia =

Kampos Κάμπος
- Community
- Location within Greece
- Coordinates: 36°56′N 22°12′E
- Country: Greece
- Administrative region: Peloponnese
- Regional unit: Messenia
- Municipality: West Mani
- Municipal unit: Avia

Population (2021)
  - Community: 367
- Time zone: UTC+2 (EET)
  - Summer (DST): UTC+3 (EEST)
- Vehicle registration: KM

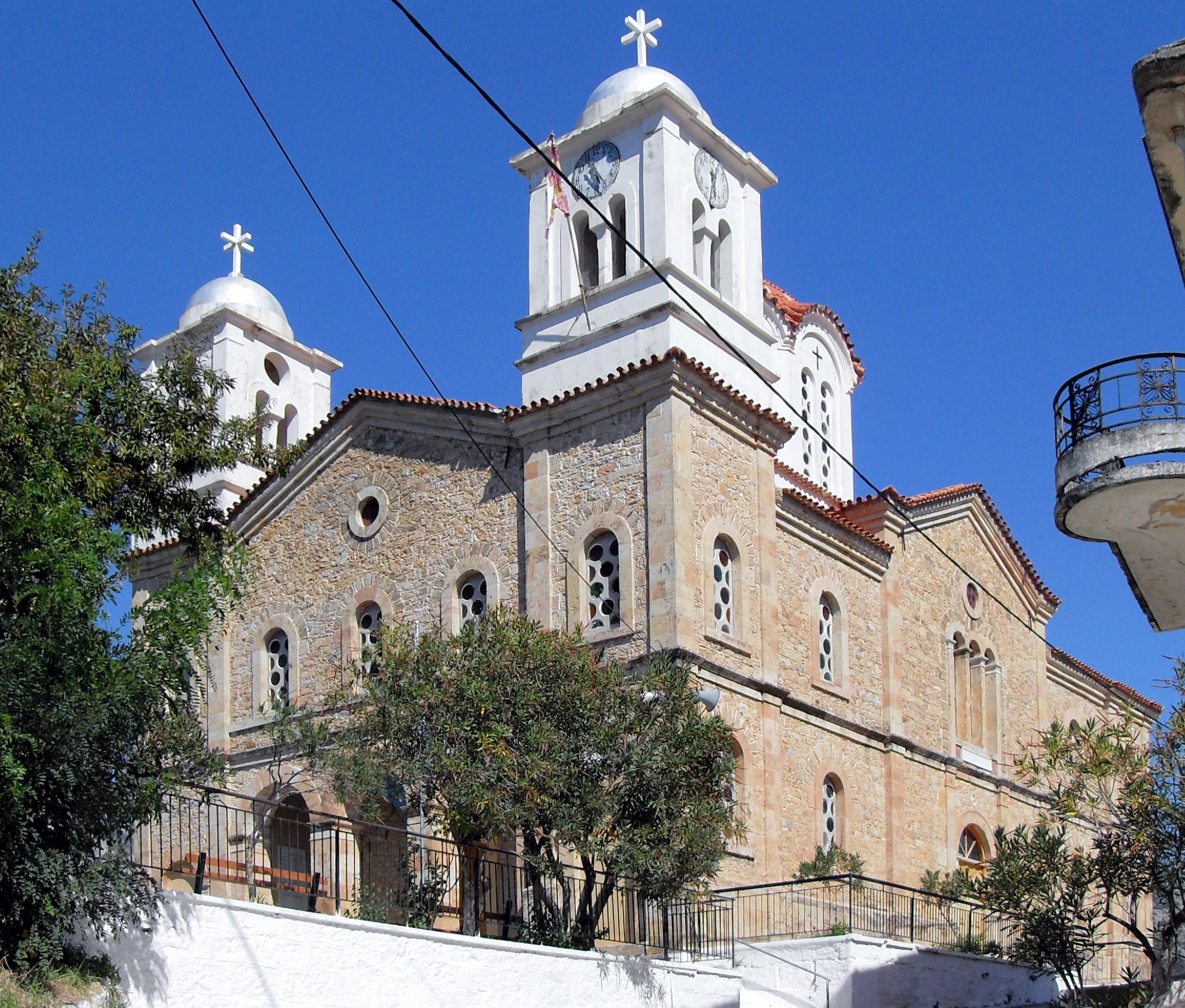
Saint Barbara church

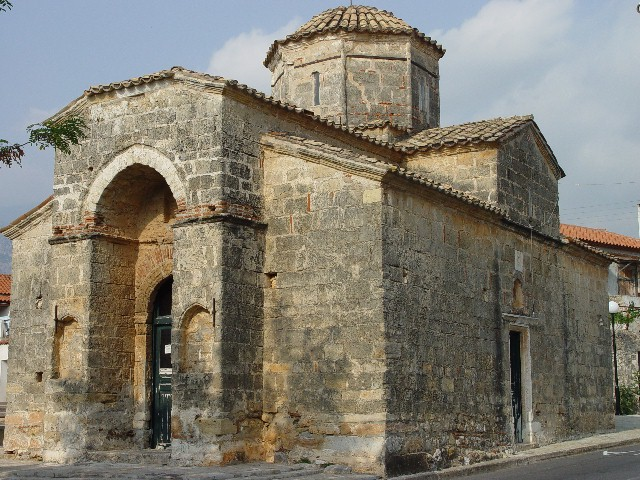
Byzantine Saints Theodoroi church

Kampos (Greek: Κάμπος) is a village and a community in the Mani Peninsula, in Messenia in southern Greece. Kampos had 367 inhabitants in 2021. It is on the provincial Kalamata-Areopoli road, 22 km. away from Kalamata.

In the village there is the Byzantine Church of Saints Theodores which is known for its frescoes. Also, there is the small Church of St. John with 13th-century frescoes, and the tower house of the Koumoundouros family, in which Alexandros Koumoundouros (a 19th-century politician and prime minister of Greece) was born. Near this tower-house there is the arched Mycenaean tomb of Machaon, son of Asclepius. Above the village is the castle of Zarnata.

Kampos was the seat of the former municipality of Avia. It has a primary school and a junior high school.
