= The Wind Singer =

2000 novel by William Nicholson

- 'The Wind Singer' Cover
- Author: William Nicholson
- Cover artist: Peter Sís
- Language: English
- Series: Wind On Fire
- Genre: Adventure novel
- Publisher: Hyperion Books
- Publication date: 2000
- Publication place: United Kingdom
- Media type: Print (Paperback or Hardcover)
- Pages: 354 pp
- Followed by: Slaves of the Mastery

The Wind Singer is a young adult novel written by William Nicholson. It is the first book of the Wind on Fire trilogy. It follows the quest of twins Kestrel and Bowman Hath, and their acquaintance Mumpo to restore the "Voice of the Wind Singer" to their city and bring happiness to their cruel society. The Wind Singer won the 2000 Nestlé Smarties Book Prize and the Blue Peter Best Book Award for "The Book I Couldn't Put Down".

== Plot ==
The book begins in the walled city of Aramanth, an extreme meritocracy where endless exams and ratings are the only way to move forward to improved life stations; to be unsuccessful in this is seen as a great source of shame. Using a system based on colour classifications, the governing Examiners dictate what people can wear, where they can live and what jobs they can do. The levels are grey, maroon, orange, scarlet and white, with the muddy Underlake the lowest and white the highest. The Emperor is the only person allowed to wear blue.

A minority in their society, the Haths believe more in ideas and dreams than in endless toil and ratings. When young Kestrel defies the harsh classification system of Aramanth she flees, finding herself in the company of the Emperor of Aramanth. Thought to be the ruler of the city, he is found to be merely a puppet of the High Examiner. The Emperor tells Kestrel the old legend of the need to rid Aramanth of the influence of the evil Morah and return the voice to the mysterious Wind Singer that stands in the city arena.

Using an archaic map given to her by the Emperor she sets off, joined by her twin brother Bowman and their brave but pitiful new friend Mumpo, who has an unshakeable affection for Kestrel. They meet a variety of tribes and individuals including the fearsome nomadic clans of Ombaraka and Omchaka. The journey eventually leads them to the Halls of the Morah; the very heart of the evil that has taken control of the city. Here the children finally retrieve the voice of the Wind Singer, in the process waking the terrible Zars, an army of the Morah. Pursued by the beautiful, evil and unstoppable Zars, the children race back to Aramanth, arriving just in time to return the Wind Singer's voice. The voice allows the Wind Singer to emit a powerful song that destroys the Zars and saves Aramanth.

== Characters ==
- Kestrel Hath is the main character. She hates exams, family ratings and school.
- Bowman Hath is Kestrel's twin brother who accompanies her on the journey.
- Hanno Hath, the twins' father.
- Ira Hath, the twins' mother, a prophetess who is a direct descendant of prophet Ira Manth.
- Pinto "Pinpin" Hath is the twins' little sister who is tested in the beginning of the book.
- Mumpo is the silly and smelly orphan dunce who really likes Kestrel, after Kestrel sat next to him in class.
- The Emperor of Aramanth is a puppet ruler who is unable to leave his apartments, but possesses important knowledge about the history of Aramanth.
- The Wind Singer is a statue in the centre of Aramanth which once sang beautiful songs that made all who heard it happy. It sings no longer as the people of Aramanth were forced to give the "Voice of the Wind Singer" to the Morah people in exchange for protection from the evil Zars.
