= Wind on Fire =

Fantasy trilogy by William Nicholson

- The Wind Singer (2000); Slaves of the Mastery (2001); Firesong (2002)
- Author: William Nicholson
- Language: English
- Genre: Children's Fantasy
- Published: 2000 - 2003
- Media type: Print
- No. of books: 3

Wind on Fire is a fantasy trilogy written by William Nicholson, consisting of the following books: The Wind Singer (2000), Slaves of the Mastery (2001), and Firesong (2002).

== Plot overview ==
The books are set in a realm similar to ours, but separate. They tell the story of the Hath family and the Manth people, who go on a long, harsh journey from their city-prison to their homeland. The main characters, Kestrel and Bowman Hath, are twins who have certain powers that allow them to save their people, and friends, from an evil power called the Morah. The first book tells of the events unfolding near and inside Aramanth, the second one talks about the lives of the Manth people as slaves in The Mastery, and the third book concludes with their voyage to the homeland.

The trilogy begins with The Wind Singer, which introduces the protagonists Kestrel and her beloved empath brother, Bowman. They live in a city called Aramanth, where personal freedoms don't exist and success depends solely on performance in universal compulsory examinations. Kestrel is a strong-willed individual who fiercely loves her family and despises the Exams. So great is her hatred of them that she denounces all the values and principles of Aramanth, as well as denying the existence of the Emperor, the unseen ruler of Aramanth. This sets in motion a chain of events that eventually results in Kestrel, Bowman and a neglected boy called Mumpo escaping from the city and going on a quest to save their people from an evil entity known as the Morah, which controls a numberless army of malevolent and deadly beings called the Zars. The children are successful, and a new era dawns for Aramanth.

In Slaves of the Mastery the people of Aramanth have become pleasant and passive, no longer in the grip of the Morah. This new meekness attracts the attention of the powerful Mastery, a realm built entirely by slave labour and ruled by the merciless Master. Aramanth is destroyed and survivors of the slaughter - including the Haths- are taken into slavery. Kestrel evades capture and sets off after her family, intent on revenge and the liberation of her people. In the course of the book Bowman finds his psychic powers growing, and discovers that he has a greater part to play in the destiny of his people than he originally knew. Ira Hath also begins to prophesy about the destiny of the Manth people and a return to their homeland. Bowman eventually defeats the Master, destroying the Mastery and leaving his people free to seek out the homeland.

The trilogy concludes with Firesong, which sees the remaining Manth people follow prophetess Ira Hath to the Manth homeland. Contending with harsh weather, starvation and various other dangers of the wilderness, the band struggle to survive, whilst Ira grows weaker the closer they get. Bowman and Kestrel leave their family in order to train as Singer people and they finally understand their part to play in what is to come. Kestrel sacrifices herself, along with the Singer people, in a final battle against the Morah, causing the “wind on fire” to sweep the world and purge it of the evil entity. This allows the Manth people to finally reach the homeland, where they begin their lives again.

== Characters ==
Kestrel Hath: The main character in the trilogy. Kestrel, known as Kess to those close to her, has an extremely strong personality that does not submit to repression of any kind. This often leads her to rash, instinctive action rather than first thinking things through. At the age of 10, Kestrel, along with her brother Bowman and her friend Mumpo, return the voice of the wind singer to their hometown of Aramanth in order to release the evil Morah's hold on the city. Five years later, when Aramanth is burned by the Mastery, Kestrel is separated from her people, but is reunited with them through the marriage of the Johdila Sirharasi of Gang to Marius Semeon Ortiz, adoptive son of the Master. After the fall of the Mastery, Kestrel accompanies the Manth people part of their way to the "homeland", but is taken by the Singer people as the child of the prophet Ira Manth to help them destroy the Morah. Kestrel "dies" in the process of this, but her spirit remains a part of Bowman's mind. Kestrel shares a deep emotional bond with her twin brother Bowman which allows them to communicate telepathically.

Bowman Hath: Kestrel's twin brother. He is somewhat empathetic, and can 'read' hearts and minds. As a person, Bowman is much quieter, less outspoken and less rash than his sister. A phrase often used to describe the two is "He is the one who feels, and she is the one who does". Bowman assists Kestrel and Mumpo in the retrieval of the wind singer's voice, is taken as a slave to the Mastery and later helps the Manth people to find their homeland. He also falls in love with the Johdila Sirharasi ("Sisi"), a princess of the land of Gang. Although he at first does not pursue their relationship, believing he had to die in order to defeat the Morah, it turns out that Kestrel must die instead of him. Bowman marries Sisi, becomes the ruler of Gang and has three children: Sirharani, Falcon and Ira.

Maslo Inch: The power-hungry High Examiner of Aramanth in Book 1. He punishes the Hath family for rebelling against his system of examinations and ratings, but is stripped of power when Aramanth is freed from the Morah. He also reveals that he is the father of Mumpo. After the loss of his title, Maslo becomes a humble person, seemingly having lost some of his mental faculties, and hardly an adequate father for Mumpo. He is the first of the Manth people to be burned to death in the monkey cages of the Mastery, a deed ordered by Marius Semeon Ortiz to deter any further dissent amongst the new slaves.

Pinto (Pinpin) Hath: Kestrel and Bowman's younger sister. She takes her first test at the age of two at the beginning of the story. As she grows older she becomes infatuated with Mumpo, to the point of hating her sister, through jealousy of Mumpo's adoration of her. She shares Kestrel's fiery determination, and it is later discovered that she shares at least some of her family's psychic powers as well. The epilogue of the final book tells of her eventual betrothal to Mumpo.

Hanno Hath: Kestrel, Bowman and Pinto's father. He works as a librarian, and although intelligent, performs poorly in Aramanth's High Examinations due to his quiet rebellion against the system. When he is taken away to a Residential Study Course, which is described as "more like prison", he stirs himself and the other members up in rebellion. Members of this group, including Miko Mimilith and especially Scooch, become more trusting of Hanno through this. Hanno becomes the leader of the Manth people after they escape from the Mastery and successfully leads them to the Manth homeland.

Ira Hath: Hanno's wife. Descended from the great prophet Ira Manth, Ira often enjoys using her 'prophetess voice'. She decides, after Kestrel and Bowman begin their quest and her husband is imprisoned, to actually act as a prophetess, wearing forbidden many-coloured clothing and standing at the foot of the wind singer to preach to the people. Throughout the second and third books, her powers of prophecy grow as her strength wanes. She eventually leads the Manth people to their promised land, but dies just before she herself reaches it.

Mumpo Inch: A dribbling and foul-smelling boy who is at the bottom of Kestrel's class. It is implied that he suffers from some form of learning disability. As the books progress, however, he matures and becomes surprisingly endearing. At the end of The Wind Singer Mumpo finds out that his father is Maslo Inch, the high examiner. Kestrel hates him in the first book and is angered that he joins her quest, but learns to like him. In the second book he trains to be a gladiator for the Mastery. This training makes him the Manth people's best warrior. In love with Kestrel from the first time she spoke to him, he is eventually betrothed to her sister, Pinto.

Sirharasi (Sisi): Featuring only in books 2 and 3, she is a beautiful but spoiled and childish princess, who has an arranged marriage to Ortiz, heir of the Master. After falling in love with Bowman, she rebels and refuses to marry, which throws the whole country of the Mastery into chaos. After being disfigured by Zohan for refusing to marry him she changes and matures greatly, shedding her royal status and joining the Manth people on their voyage. She marries Bowman and has several children by him.

Marius Semeon Ortiz: A young, handsome and prominent general. He leads the army that destroys Aramanth, hoping to gain favour with the Master by bringing back a record number of slaves. Successful in this endeavour, he is made the Master's heir and thus groom to Sisi's bride. Though in love with Kestrel, he submits to the Master's will to marry Sisi, however when order to kill her by the master he attempts to but finds he cannot at the last moment but Mumpo sees him with his sword raised and kills him unknowingly.

Albard: A.K.A. the Master, a rebellious Singer. In Firesong he teaches Bowman how to use his powers.

The Morah: A satanic character, the Morah is mentioned in the first book as being a "Spirit lord" who grew envious of the Wind-Singer and stole its power. The Manth people greatly fear the Morah and deny its existence, dismissing it as a metaphor for the evil in humanity. As such, whenever the Morah is mentioned someone will say "the Morah comes from within." During the first two books the Morah is described as being a single individual responsible for all the pain and suffering in the world but in the third book it is revealed to be a legion of tormented, half-dead human souls, possibly a reference to the demonic character, "Legion" from The Bible. In the first book Kestrel and Bowman meet an old woman in the Halls of the Morah who later appears as one of the legion of the Morah in Firesong. When Bowman looks into the old woman's eyes she sees a vast congregation of smaller eyes and hears a voice in her head say "We are The Morah, we are legion". The Morah also is responsible for the powerful army of Zars which is the legion and can be beaten only by the Wind-Singer's song.

Rufy Blesh: An intelligent, determined strong boy who used to be in the same class at school as Kestrel, Bowman and Mumpo. He escapes the Mastery, a consequence of which is that 20 of his people are burned to death in a monkey wagon. In Firesong it is discovered that he joined the Barra klin, a bandit tribe that lived in desert. Full of remorse for the people who died because of him, he sacrifices his life so that Kestrel and other girls can escape the Barra klin.

Ira Manth: Ira Manth was the first prophet of the Manth people. His followers, the Singer people, and his descendants gained his power when he died. He is only mentioned in legends in the first book, for he is long dead. Ira Hath, Pinto, Bowman, and Kestrel are all his descendants. He wrote many testaments but only one of them was ever mentioned in the book (Slaves of the Mastery): "The Lost Testament", believed lost until Hanno Hath finds it in the Mastery's stores. It predicts a coming storm called the Wind on Fire, and of the Manth people finding the homeland.

Silman Pillish: A.K.A. Principal Pillish, He was the head of the Residential Study Course where Hanno Hath was taken in The Wind Singer. Initially, he was pleased with Hanno's work, but later when he learned of his rebellion he was disappointed. He accompanies the Haths to seek the homeland. He continuously keeps doubting Ira's ability to lead them there. In the epilogue of Firesong, he has opened a school in the homeland for all the children.

== Themes ==
=== Order and Control ===
Order and control play a major role in the trilogy. They symbolize that which is at the heart of evil, and the Haths (especially Kestrel and Ira) symbolize freedom, and individuality. At the beginning of "The Wind Singer", Aramanth and its inhabitants are subject to a strict system, and when someone like Kestrel defies the system they are severely reprimanded, showing the grip that the Morah has on the city. The High Examiner is so bent on control that he acts almost insanely when he is crossed. He displays utter disbelief that anyone could undermine or dislike the examination system. The control is illustrated by the rules such as having everyone wear colours to define their place in society, which promotes a sense of having to conform to the group.

In Slaves of the Mastery, control is achieved with fear and threats. If one person disobeys, many are killed, to discourage others from doing the same. Also, control via strength of mind features frequently, and is a skill which at the end of the book " Firesong" enables the Manth people to fly to their homeland. This control of oneself symbolises the liberation of the Manth people (and the world).

=== Individuality ===
This is the converse side of order. The Hath family's patchwork quilt of many colours shows that they are important, as they are the only ones who seem not to be affected by the monotony that subdues the rest of the city. The Evil army, The Zars, is made up of an infinite number of people who all act as one. When they march towards Aramanth there is a canyon blocking their way, which they walk straight off, knowing that eventually the pile of the dead will be high enough for the remainder of the army to walk over. The Wind Singer, with its voice returned, promotes individuality, and destroys the Zars.

Likewise, The Morah is eventually revealed to be a conglomerate of souls and their violent emotions rather than an actual individual.

=== Fear ===
Nicholson uses powerfully emotive devices to create not only a real sense of fear amongst the characters, but also to make the reader relate directly to this strong emotion. As mentioned above, fear is used to assert control, for example Kestrel's fear of living in the dark and smelly sewer town, and also the dread which fills her when she sees the old children.

== See also ==
- Aramanth
