= Avia, Messenia =

Avia Αβία
- Municipal unit
- Location within the regional unit

- Location within Greece
- Coordinates: 36°58′N 22°09′E
- Country: Greece
- Administrative region: Peloponnese
- Regional unit: Messenia
- Municipality: West Mani

Area
  - Municipal unit: 179.8 km^{2} (69.4 sq mi)

Population (2021)
  - Municipal unit: 1,915
  - Municipal unit density: 10.65/km^{2} (27.59/sq mi)
  - Community: 642
- Time zone: UTC+2 (EET)
  - Summer (DST): UTC+3 (EEST)
- Vehicle registration: ΚΜ

Avia (Greek: Αβία, Ancient Greek: ἡ Ἀβία) is a village and a former municipality in Messenia, Peloponnese, Greece. Since the 2011 local government reform it is part of the municipality West Mani, of which it is a municipal unit. The municipal unit has an area of 179.828 km^{2}. The seat of the municipality was in Kampos. Avia is a popular tourist destination. It also has a large olive production. Avia is situated on the east coast of the Messenian Gulf, southeast of Kalamata, southwest of Sparta and northwest of Kardamyli.

== History ==
=== Ancient Abia ===
In the location where Paliochora is located today, the Homeric city of Ire (Ιρή) is supposed to have stood (Iliad I 150 and I 292). The 2nd century traveller Pausanias mentioned in his Description of Greece that the city Ire was renamed Abia by Cresphontes, king of Messene, after Abia, the nursemaid of his great-grandfather Hyllus, son of Heracles. Abia was disputed between the Messenians and the Spartans. Abia became a member of the Achaean League in 181 BCE. In the city was a temple of Asclepius. It continued to be a place of some importance down to the reign of Hadrian, as we learn from an extant inscription of that period. After Pausanias' time, Abia was not mentioned in sources. It was probably destroyed during barbarian invasions.

=== Later period ===
In the early 15th century, the Venetians built the castle of Mantineia at the location of the ancient city. It was the seat of the barony with the same name. Mantineia was abandoned by its inhabitants to escape pirate raids, and they settled in the inland village of Megali Mantineia. The ruined castle town received the name Palaiochora. In 1775, the Church of the Dormition was built at the site of the temple of Asclepius.

From the mid-19th century, the inhabitants of Megali Mantineia began to settle in the beach area again, in the settlements Palaiochora, Archontiko and Kopanoi (the modern Akrogiali). Palaiochora became the seat of the community of Megali Mantineia in 1924. In 1926 both the settlement Palaiochora and the community were renamed to Avia. In 1998, the community Avia merged with 7 other communities to form the new municipality Avia, with its seat in Kampos.

== Subdivisions ==
The municipal unit Avia is subdivided into the following communities (constituent villages in brackets):

- Avia (Avia, Akrogiali, Megali Mantineia)
- Altomira
- Doloi (Ano Doloi, Kato Doloi, Kalianaiika, Kitries)
- Kampos (Kampos, Orovas, Platoma, Toumpia)
- Kentro (Kentro, Anatoliko, Chora Gaitson, Voreio)
- Pigadia (Pigadia, Dendra, Krya Vrysi, Rizana)
- Stavropigi (Stavropigi, Malta)
- Sotirianika (Sotirianika, Charavgi, Drosopigi, Kouris)

== Population ==
Year	Village population	Community population	Municipal unit population
1981	324	-	-
1991	185	-	2,908
2001	217	528	2,391
2011	281	611	2,246
2021	267	642	1,915

== Points of interests ==
- Saint George Monastery on a panoramic location
- Santava Cape
- Beaches: Archontiko, Koukkinos, Lykotropia (Λυκοτροπία), Paliochora, Portela, Patsourou (Πατσούρου), Poliana (Πολιάνα), Akrogiali and Santava or Sandova (Σάντοβα)

== People ==
- Alexandros Koumoundouros, Prime Minister of Greece

== See also ==
- List of settlements in Messenia

== Sources ==
- Stavrou Kapetanaki I Mandinies tis Manis (Οι Μαντίνειες της Μάνης = The Mantineies of Mani)
- Theodoros Belitsos Mantineia in 1700, Economy, Demographics and Onomatological Origins
- Theodoros Belitsos The Marriage Book of Megali Mantineias near Avia (1869-1891)
