= Ira (Messenia) =

Ira (Ancient Greek: Ἰρά), or Ire (Ἱρὴ), was a town of ancient Messenia, mentioned by Homer in the Iliad, as one of the seven towns which Agamemnon offered to Achilles. It is identified with either the later Abia on the Messenian Gulf, or the later Eira. Its location necessarily depends on which identification is accepted.
