= Ira (mythology) =

Polynesian sky goddess

In Polynesian mythology, Ira (also known as Hera) is the sky goddess and mother of the stars.
