= Messenian Gulf =

Gulf of the Mediterranean Sea in Greece

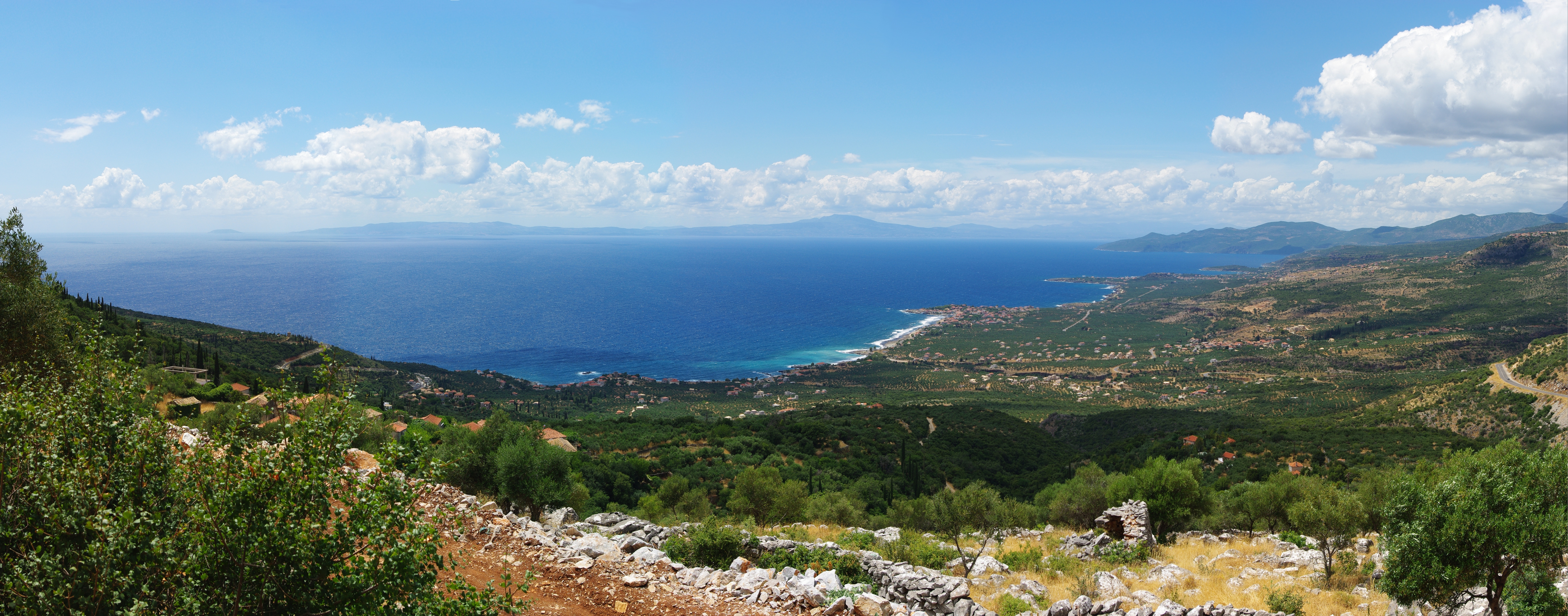
- View of the Messenian Gulf

- Location of the Messenian Gulf within Greece
- Location: Southeast Europe
- Coordinates: 36°50′N 22°4′E
- Type: Gulf
- Primary inflows: Mediterranean Sea
- Basin countries: Greece
- Max. length: 72 km (45 mi)
- Max. width: 42 km (26 mi) (min)
- Max. depth: 2,310 m (7,580 ft)

The Messenian Gulf (Greek: Μεσσηνιακός Κόλπος, Messiniakós Kólpos) is a sea that is part of the Ionian Sea. The gulf is circumscribed by the southern coasts of Messenia and the southwestern coast of the Mani peninsula in Laconia. Its bounds are Venetiko Island to the west and Cape Tainaron to the southeast. The western shores are mostly low-lying, fertile and well-developed, while the eastern shore is dominated by the southern foothills of the Taygetos and comparatively rocky and inaccessible, with few settlements.

The Pamisos River flows into the gulf near the port city of Kalamata, which is the gulf's major urban centre.

== Places by the gulf ==
- Koroni - west
- Longa - west
- Petalidi - northwest
- Messini - northwest
- Kalamata - northeast
- Kardamyli - east
- Stoupa - east
- Agios Nikolaos - east
- Trahila - southeast
- Areopoli - southeast
- Gerolimenas - southeast
