= West Mani =

Municipality in Messenia, Greece

West Mani Δυτική Μάνη
- Municipality
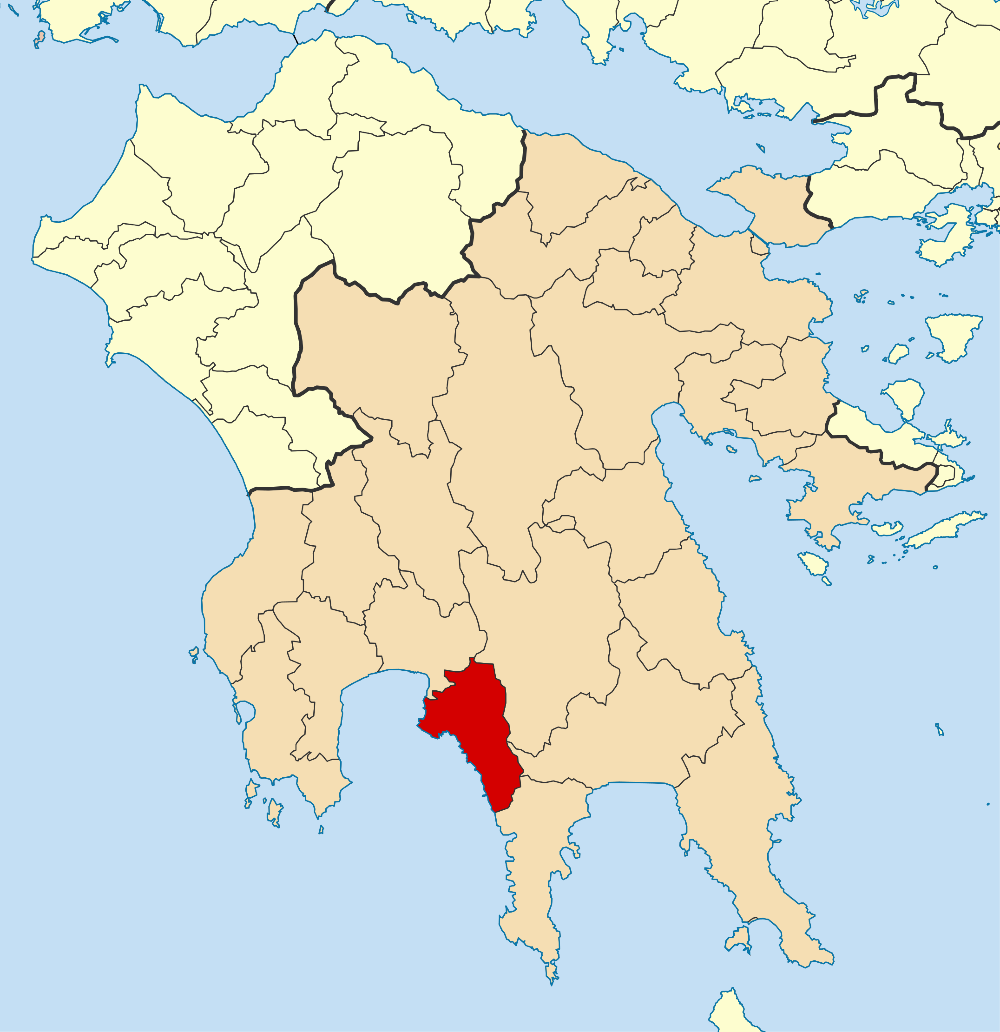

- Location within Greece
- Coordinates: 36°51′N 22°16′E
- Country: Greece
- Administrative region: Peloponnese
- Regional unit: Messenia
- Seat: Kardamyli

Area
  - Municipality: 402.8 km^{2} (155.5 sq mi)

Population (2021)
  - Municipality: 5,875
  - Density: 14.59/km^{2} (37.78/sq mi)
- Time zone: UTC+2 (EET)
  - Summer (DST): UTC+3 (EEST)

West Mani (Greek: Δυτική Μάνη, romanized: Dytiki Mani) is a municipality in the Messenia regional unit, Peloponnese, Greece. The seat of the municipality is the town Kardamyli. The municipality has an area of 402.809 km^{2}.

It comprises the northwestern part of the geographic and historical region of the Mani Peninsula, also known as Messenian Mani (Μεσσηνιακή Μάνη) or Outer Mani (Έξω Μάνη), in juxtaposition with the southeastern part of Mani (Laconian Mani or Inner Mani), which is covered by the municipality of East Mani.

== Municipality ==
The municipality of West Mani was established in 2011 by the Kallikratis Programme, a nationwide administrative reform. As a consequence of the reform, the municipalities of Avia and Lefktro were merged into the new municipality of West Mani.
