= Long-distance trail =

Long trail for recreational outdoor activities

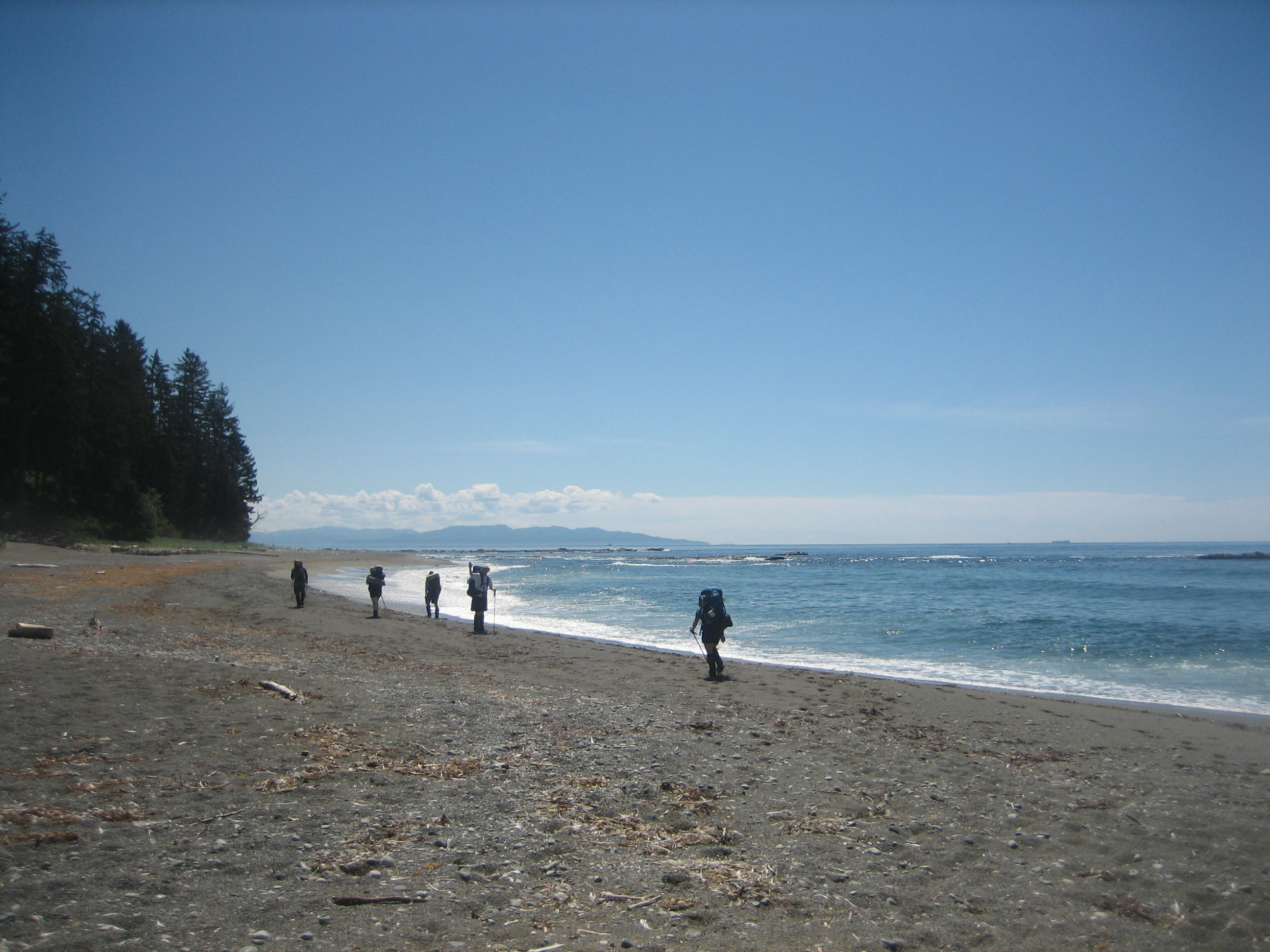
Hikers on the West Coast Trail on Vancouver Island in British Columbia, Canada

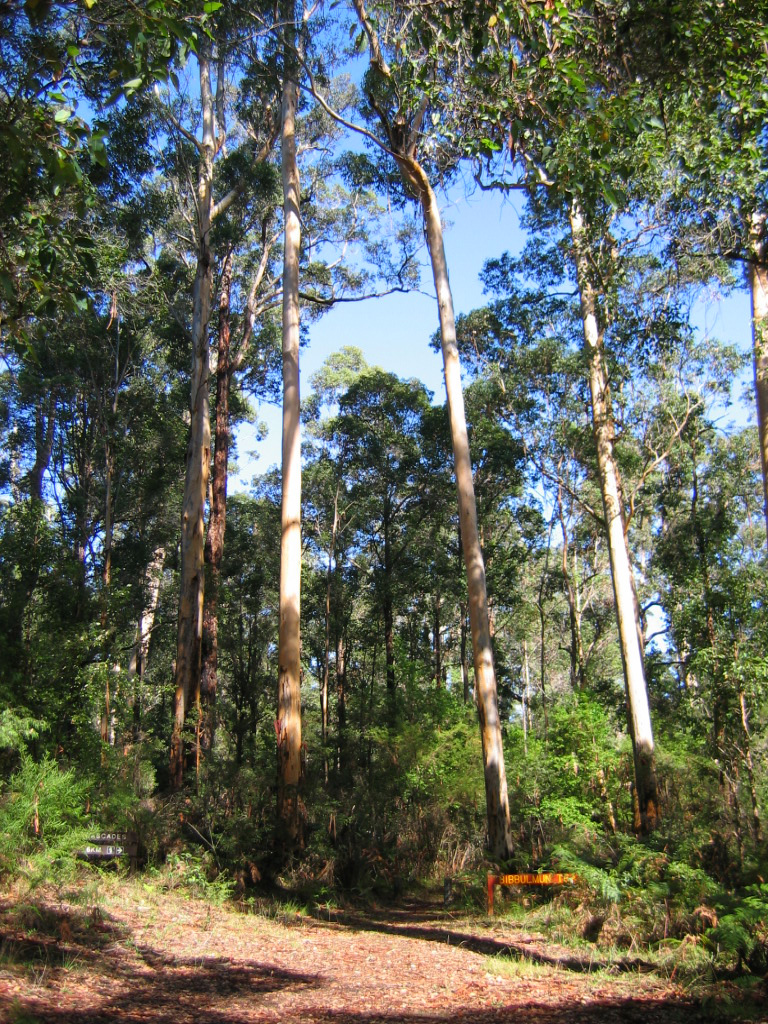
Karri forest along Bibbulmun Track south of Pemberton, Western Australia

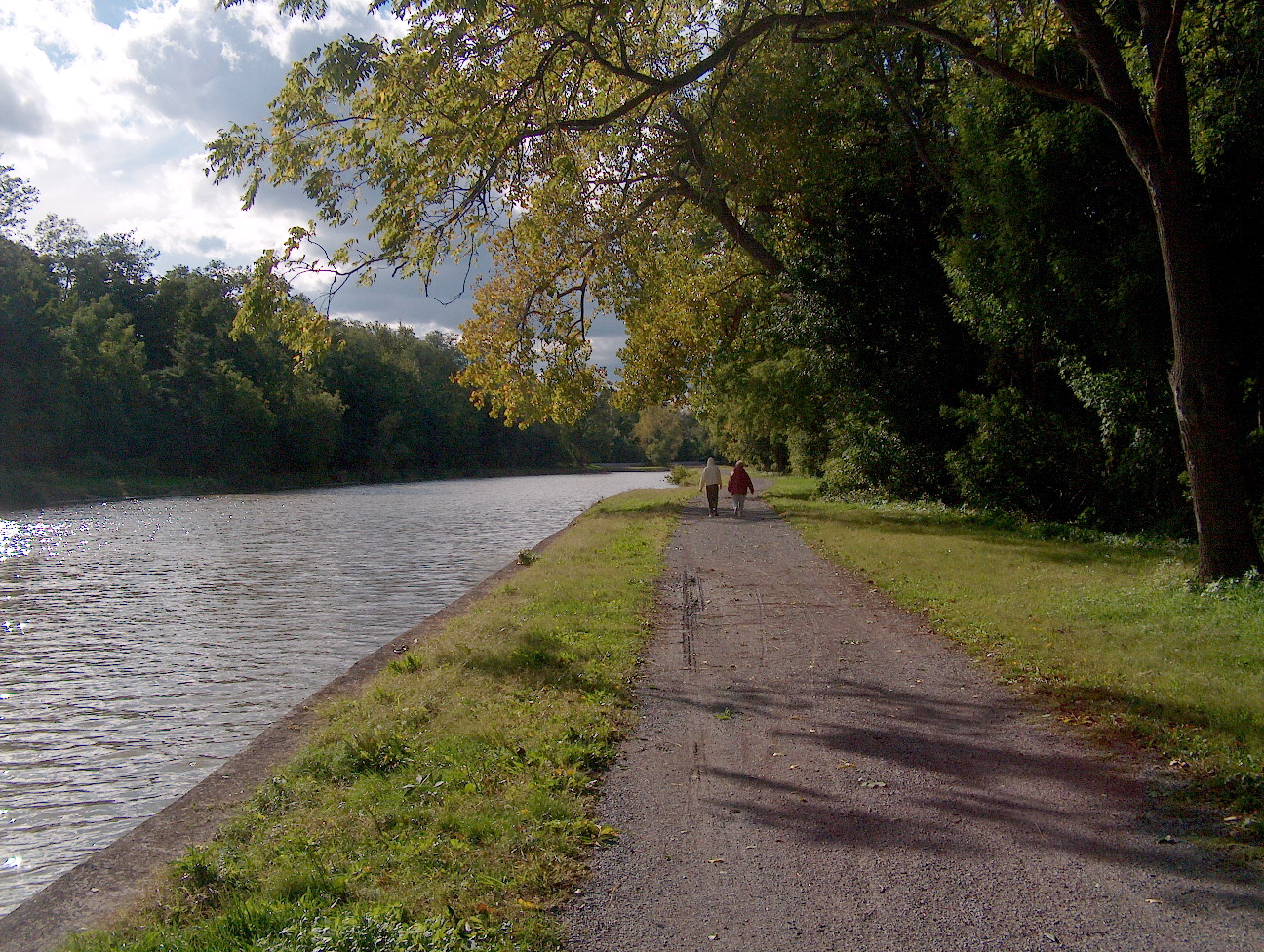
Present-day Erie Canal near Rochester, New York, United States

A long-distance trail (or long-distance footpath, way, greenway) is a longer recreational trail mainly through rural areas used for hiking, backpacking, cycling, equestrianism or cross-country skiing. They exist on all continents except Antarctica.

Many trails are marked on maps. Typically, a long-distance route will be at least 50 km (30 mi) long, but many run for several hundred miles, or longer.

Many routes are waymarked and may cross public or private land and/or follow existing rights of way. Generally, the surface is not specially prepared, and the ground can be rough and uneven in areas, except in places such as converted rail tracks or popular walking routes where stone-pitching and slabs have been laid to prevent erosion. In some places, official trails will have the surface specially prepared to make the going easier.

== History ==
Historically, and still nowadays in countries where most people move on foot or with pack animals, long-distance trails linked far away towns and regions. Such paths followed "logical" routes, that can be approximated to least-cost paths. The introduction of mechanical and motorized transport during the Industrial Revolution in the 19th century changed all this.

== Hiking trails ==
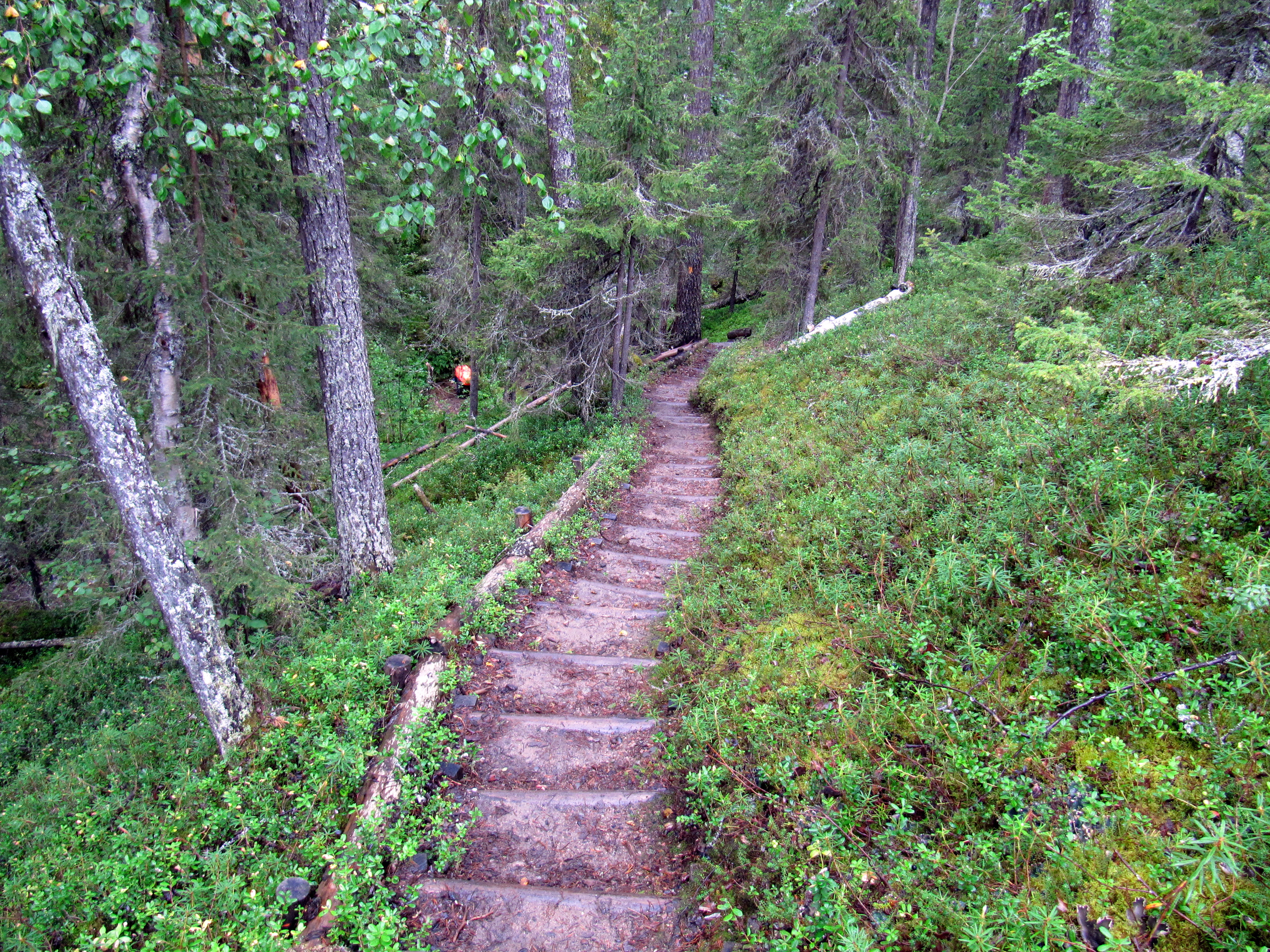
The Karhunkierros ("Bear's Round"), an 80 km (50 mi) long hiking trail through Oulanka National Park in Kuusamo, Finland

=== Europe ===
GR footpaths are long-distance footpaths in Italy, France, Belgium, the Netherlands, Spain and Portugal (the Alta Via in Italian, Grande Randonnée in French, Grote Routepaden or Lange-afstand-wandelpaden in Dutch, Grande Rota in Portuguese or Gran Recorrido in Spanish).

==== United Kingdom ====
National Trails are a network of officially sanctioned footpaths in the United Kingdom which are well maintained and well way-marked across England and Wales. Examples are the Pennine Way and the South West Coast Path. The equivalent routes in Scotland are styled as Scotland's Great Trails; they include the West Highland Way and the Speyside Way.

The success of the Welsh Government's 870-mile Wales Coast Path prompted an ongoing project of create a similar route for England. When completed, the King Charles III England Coast Path will be around 2,700 miles long.

There are many other recognised, sometimes waymarked, long-distance footpaths in the UK which do not have National Trail status. The Long Distance Walkers Association (LDWA) has the most comprehensive online database of long-distance paths in Britain, and members are able to download GPX files of routes. The association also maintains the LDWA National Trails Register, with different levels of membership for people who have completed five, 10, 15 or all 19 of the National Trails and Great Trails. An annual report is published in April in the association's magazine, Strider.

==== Republic of Ireland ====
The Kerry Way, in south-west Ireland, is the longest of the Irish waymarked trails and circumnavigates the highest mountain range in Ireland. Along with the adjoining Dingle Way it is noted for its scenic views of the Atlantic, loughs and mountains.

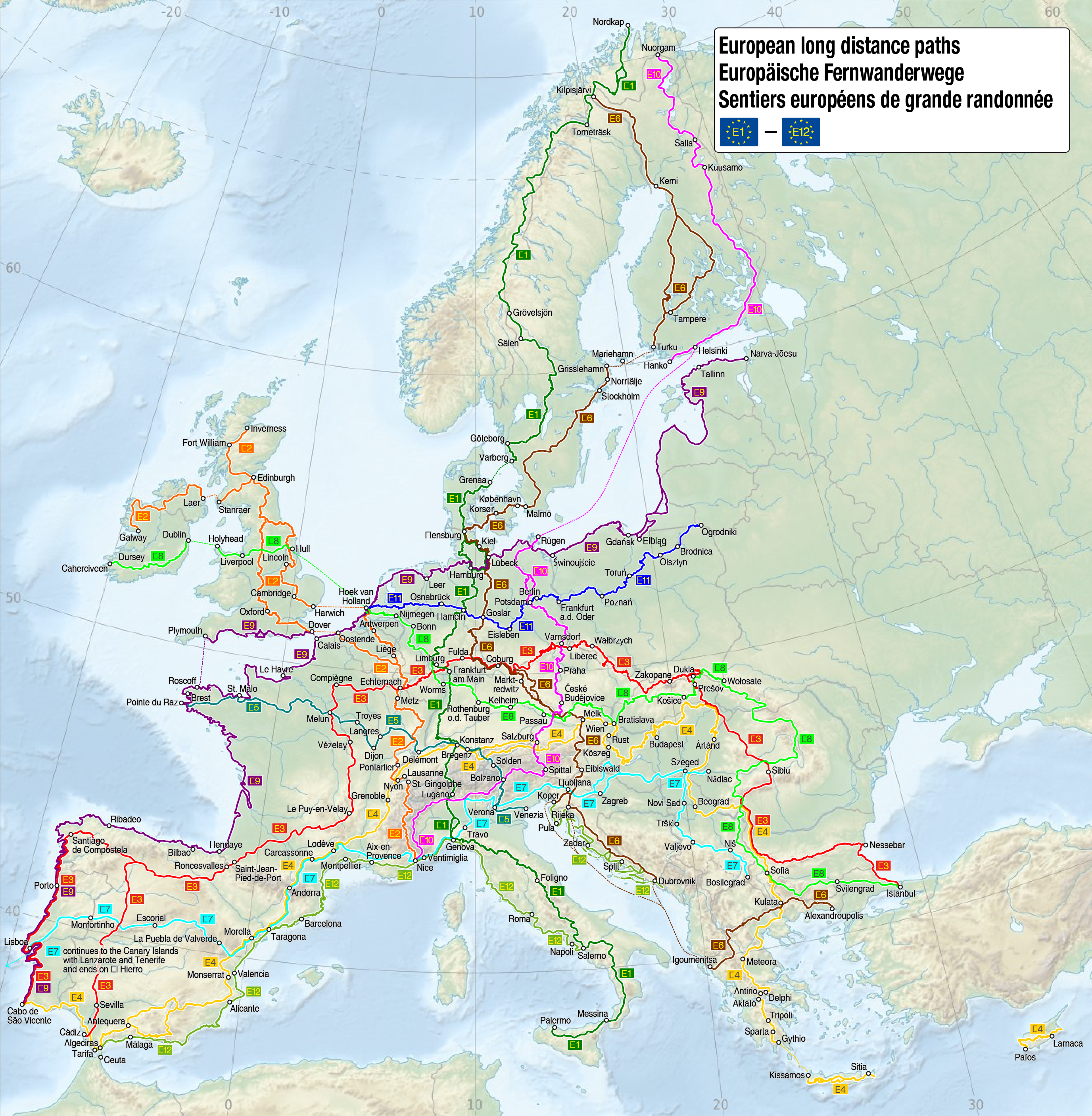
Map of European long-distance paths

=== Asia ===
==== Hong Kong ====
Long-distance trails in Hong Kong:

- Hong Kong Trail, Hong Kong
- Lantau Trail
- MacLehose Trail
- Wilson Trail

==== Japan ====
Japan has a network of ten long-distance trails called Long Distance Nature Trails. Their creation is the result of a Ministry of Environment initiative to highlight the specific environmental, cultural or historic landscapes through which the trails pass. They also aim to allow hikers a safe and easy hike in any season, as well as raising awareness of the importance of protecting natural spaces and adopting sustainable behaviors.

Long Distance Nature Trails in Japan:

- Tokai Nature Trail: 1697 kilometers
- Kyūshū Nature Trail (nicknamed Yamabikosan): 2932 kilometers
- Chūkoku Nature Trail: 2295 kilometers
- Shikoku Nature Trail (nicknamed Shikoku no Michi): 1637 kilometers
- Shutoken Nature Trail (nicknamed Kanto Fureai no Michi): 1800 kilometers
- Tōhoku Nature Trail (nicknamed Shin Oku no Hosomichi): 4374 kilometers
- Chūbu Hokuriku Nature Trail: 4085 kilometers
- Kinki Nature Trail: 3296 kilometers
- Hokkaidō Nature Trail: 4600 kilometers
- Tōhoku Pacific Coast Nature Trail (nicknamed Michinoku Coastal Trail): 1000 kilometers

=== South America ===
==== Brazil ====
In Brazil, long-distance trails are regulated by two Federal Government decrees, and implemented and managed by government agencies in partnership with many NGOs, such as the Brazilian Trails Network Association (Associação Rede Brasileira de Trilhas in Portuguese) and the Atlantic Forest Trail Institute. The aim is to create a national system of trails that are pleasant to hike, but that also generate employment and income and function as conservation tools by linking protected areas with natural corridors.

There are more than 120 trails in different stages of implementation in 25 of the 27 Brazilian states, connecting all Brazilian biomes. As of January 2022, Brazil has more than 5,500 km of managed trails and another 20,500 km planned.

Long-distance trails in Brazil:

- Atlantic Forest Trail: 4270 km
- Transmantiqueira National Trail: 1200 km
- Transcarioca Trail: 180 km
- Atlantic Amazon Trail: 350 km
- Pioneers Route: 390 km
- Serra do Mar Trail: 300 km

== Coastal trails ==
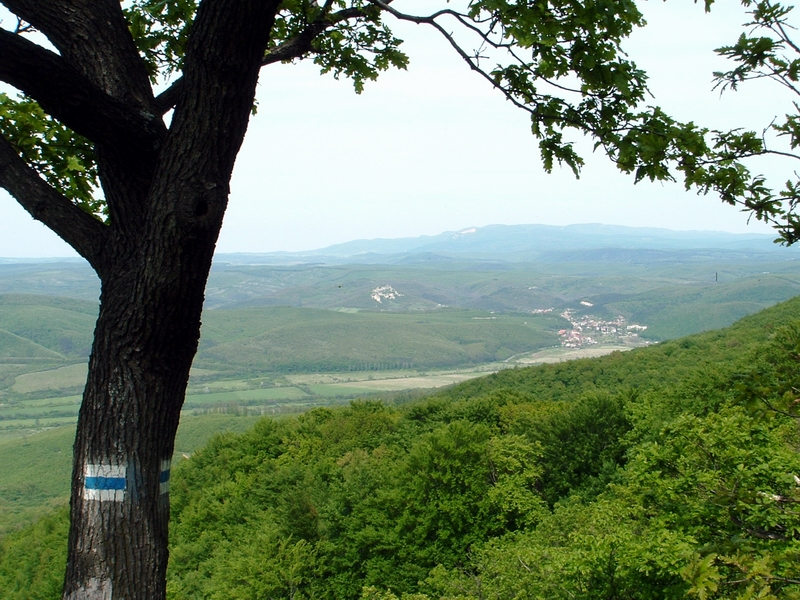
A view from the Hungarian National Blue Trail, incorporated into the European Long-Distance Walking Route E4

These follow coastlines; examples are the Brittany Coast Path in France, the California Coastal Trail in the US, the South West Coast Path in England, the East Coast Trail in Canada, and the Otter Trail in South Africa.

The King Charles III England Coast Path, in development by Natural England, will be around 4,350 kilometres (2,700 mi) long. It is expected to open by the end of 2024 as the longest coastal walking route in the world and Britain's longest National Trail.

== Coast-to-coast trails ==
These may be cross-country paths, or may follow roads or other ways, and often intersect with many other trails. Examples are Wainwright's Coast-to-Coast path in northern England, and the GR 10 in France. The English Coast to Coast route, despite being amongst the best-known long-distance walking routes in England, is not an official National Trail, but simply a series of connected pre-existing rights of way, roads and open country with some informal links between them. There is also a coast-to-coast mountain-bike route in northern England that has the same trailheads as the walkers' path. GR 10 is a French GR footpath that runs the length of the Pyrenees Mountains, roughly paralleling the French–Spanish border on the French side. It runs west to east, from Hendaye on the Bay of Biscay to Banyuls-sur-Mer on the Mediterranean Sea.

The American Discovery Trail is a hiking and biking trail that crosses the continental United States from east to west, across the mid-tier of the United States 10,900 kilometres (6,800 mi). Horses can also be ridden on most of this trail. The eastern terminus is the Delmarva Peninsula on the Atlantic Ocean and the western terminus is Point Reyes, on the northern California coast at the Pacific Ocean. The Iditarod Trail connects the coastal cities of Seward and Nome, Alaska: a distance of around 1,600 kilometres (990 mi).

- 24,000 kilometres (15,000 mi) Trans Canada Trail – Canada

== Cross-continent trails ==
The European long-distance paths (E-paths) traverse Europe, passing through many countries. Among the longest are European walking route E8 and the Iron Curtain Trail (also known as EuroVelo 13). The latter is a partially complete long-distance cycling route which will run along the entire length of the former Iron Curtain. During the period of the Cold War (c. 1947–1991), the Iron Curtain delineated the border between the Communist East and the capitalist West.

- 10,000 kilometres (6,200 mi) E4 European long-distance path From Tarifa, Andalusia, Spain, to Crete and Cyprus – not yet completely defined.
- 4,700 kilometres (2,900 mi) E8 European long-distance path from Cork, Ireland to the Turkish border of Bulgaria (incomplete).

== Other trails ==
Some of the longest walking routes worldwide:

- 5,330 kilometres (3,310 mi) Bicentennial National Trail – Australia
- 4,873 kilometers (3,000 mi) Continental Divide Trail – United States
- 4,270 kilometers (2,653 mi) Atlantic Forest Trail – Brazil
- 4,265 kilometers (2,650 mi) Pacific Crest Trail – United States
- 3,520 kilometers (2,190 mi) Appalachian Trail – United States
- 3,000 kilometres (1,900 mi) Te Araroa – New Zealand
- 1,250 kilometres (780 mi) Skåneleden – Sweden
- 1,200 kilometres (750 mi) Heysen Trail – Australia
- 1,200 kilometres (750 mi) Transmantiqueira Trail – Brazil
- 1,128 kilometres (701 mi) National Blue Trail – Hungary
- 1,100 kilometres (680 mi) TransPanama Trail – Panama
- 1,000 kilometres (620 mi) Israel National Trail – Israel

== Mountain trails ==
Long-distance mountain trails are of two broad kinds: linear trails and loop trails.

=== Europe ===
In Europe the Via Alpina consists of five connected hiking trails across the alpine regions of Slovenia, Austria, Germany, Liechtenstein, Switzerland, Italy, France and Monaco. It is 5,000 km (3,100 miles) long, with 342 day stages. Circular routes include the Tour du Mont Blanc, which passes through the Alps of France, Switzerland, and Italy. In the Balkans region, the Peaks of the Balkans Trail and High Scardus Trail connect Albania, Kosovo and Montenegro or North Macedonia respectively through a network of combined almost 700 kilometres (430 mi).

=== United States ===
In the United States, notable linear trails include the Appalachian Trail, 3,500 kilometres (2,200 mi), the Pacific Crest Trail, 4,300 kilometres (2,700 mi) and the Continental Divide Trail, 5,000 kilometres (3,100 mi). The first long-distance hiking trail in the US was begun in 1910 and named The Long Trail. Notable circular trails include the Tahoe Rim Trail and the Wonderland Trail (which encircles Mount Rainier).

=== Australia ===
The Australian Alps Walking Track traverses the alpine areas of Victoria, New South Wales and the Australian Capital Territory. It is 655 km (407 miles) long, starting at Walhalla, Victoria, and running through to Tharwa, Australian Capital Territory near Canberra.

=== Himalayas ===
The Himalayan routes are famous for attracting a large number of trekkers (backpackers). Typical trekking regions in Nepal are Annapurna, Dolpo, Langtang, Manaslu, Kangchenjunga and Mount Everest. In India, the Kashmir Valley is home to several trekking routes that traverse western sections of the Himalayas. Vishansar Lake, Gangabal Lake and Tarsar Lakes are accessible only through different trekking routes. Other popular trekking routes in India include Chandra Taal, Dzongri, Goechala, Gomukh, Hemkund, Kafni Glacier, Kailash-Manasarovar, Kedarnath, Kedartal, Milam Glacier, Nanda Devi Sanctuary, Pindari Glacier, Richenpong, Roopkund, Sar Pass, Satopanth Tal, Saurkundi Pass and the Valley of Flowers.

The Great Himalaya Trail is proposed to follow the Greater Himalaya Range from Namche Barwa in Tibet to Nanga Parbat in Pakistan, forming the world's highest mountain trail.

=== Andes ===
A long-distance trail network in the southern Andes, the 3,000-kilometre (1,900 mi) Greater Patagonian Trail, was first described in 2014. It currently connects Santiago de Chile with the Southern Patagonian Icefield and explores the remote areas of the Patagonian Andes in the border region between Chile and Argentina. The entire network currently incorporates more than 16,000-kilometre (9,900 mi) of routes and provides many packrafting options.

=== Eastern Africa ===
- Kilimandjaro in Tanzania
- Simien Mountains in Ethiopia
- Dogu'a Tembien in Ethiopia

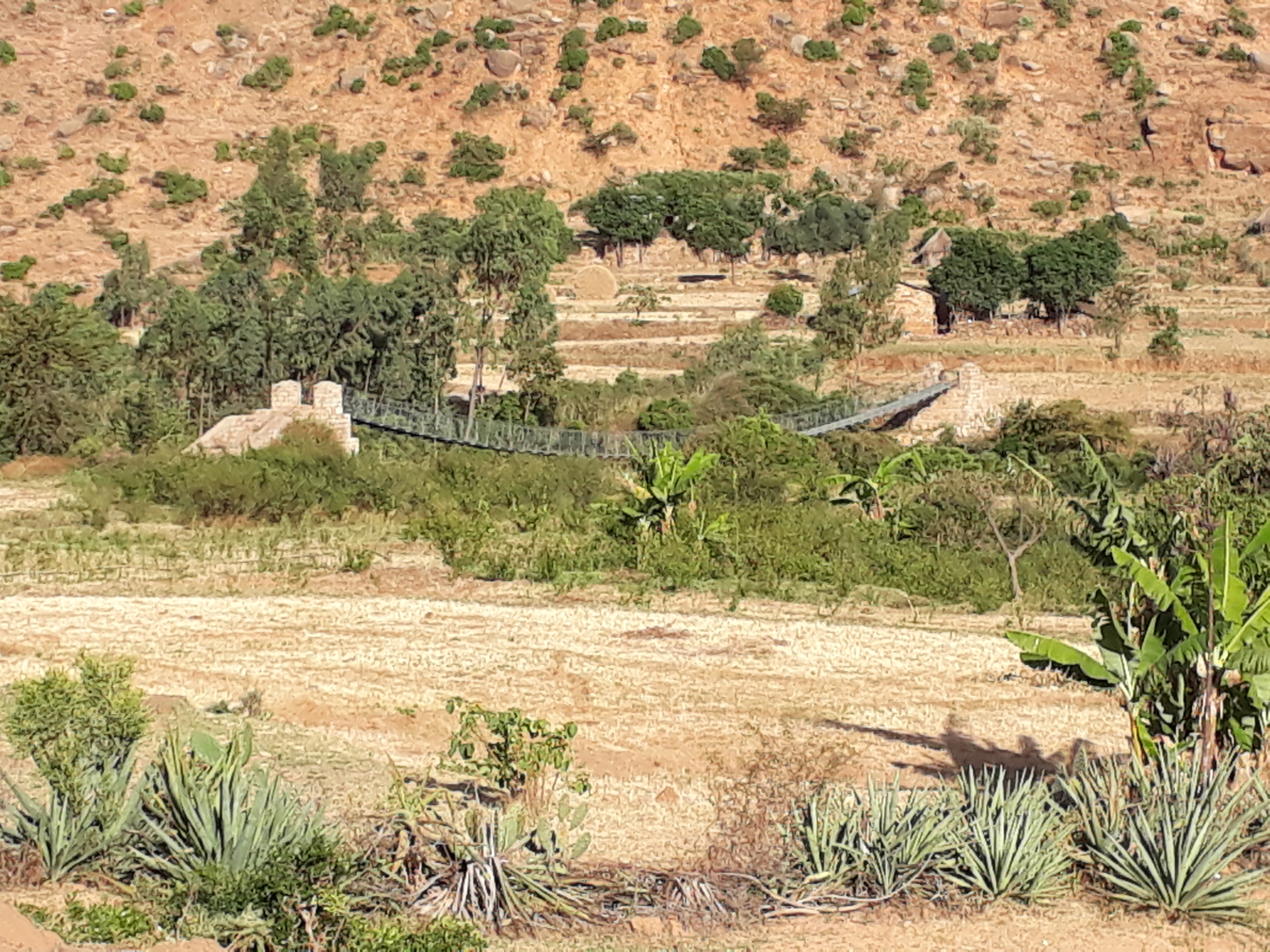
Footbridge along trail 16 in Dogu'a Tembien

== Other types ==
=== Cycling ===
These routes have been constructed mainly for bicycle touring. Some are restricted to use by only non-motorized bikes while others are multi-use recreational (i.e. hiking, horseback riding, jogging, rollerblading or walking). Some long-distance cycling routes are hundreds of miles long, such as Australia's mainly off-road Munda Biddi Trail, or even thousands of miles, such as the EuroVelo routes.

=== Canal towpaths ===
Some trails follow the towpaths of canal systems. A good example is the 845-kilometre (525 mi) New York State Canal System in New York. There also numerous routes that can be followed in Europe, which may be suitable for walkers, cyclists, horse riders and canoeists.

=== Equestrian ===
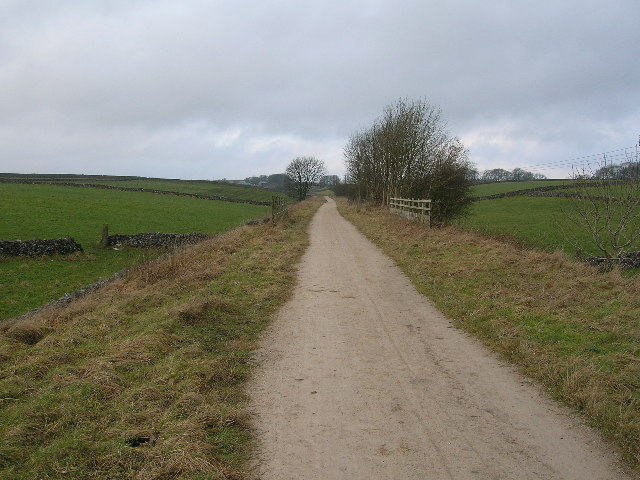
High Peak Trail, part of the Pennine Bridleway in northern England

Many long-distance trails have sections suitable for equestrians, and a few are suitable for horse riding throughout their length, or have been developed primarily for horse riding. The Bicentennial National Trail (BNT) in Australia is the longest marked multi-use trail in the world, stretching 5,330 kilometres (3,310 mi) from Cooktown, Queensland, through New South Wales to Healesville, Victoria. This non-motorised trail runs the length of the rugged Great Dividing Range through national parks and private property and alongside wilderness areas. One of the objectives was to develop a trail that linked up the brumby tracks, mustering and stock routes along the Great Dividing Range, thus allowing one legally to ride the routes of stockmen and drovers who once traveled these areas with pack horses. The Bicentennial National Trail is suitable for self-reliant horse riders, fit walkers and mountain bike riders.

In the United Kingdom, the British Horse Society is developing a network of horse trails known as the National Bridleroute Network. A number of long-distance multi-use trails have been created in England, including three National Trails: the Pennine Bridleway, 192 km (119 miles), The Ridgeway, 139 km (86 miles), and the South Downs Way, 160 km (99 miles).

=== Rail trails ===
Rail trails (or rail paths) are shared-use paths that make use of abandoned railway corridors. There are also rails with trails in the US that follow working rail tracks. Most rail trails have a gravel or dirt surface and can be used for walking, cycling, and often horse riding as well. The following description comes from Australia, but is applicable to other rail trails that exist throughout the world:

Following the route of the railways, they cut through hills, under roads, over embankments and across gullies and creeks. Apart from being great places to walk, cycle or horse ride, rail trails are linear conservation corridors protecting native plants and animals. They often link remnant vegetation in farming areas and contain valuable flora and fauna habitat. Wineries and other attractions are near many trails as well as B&B's and other great places to stay.

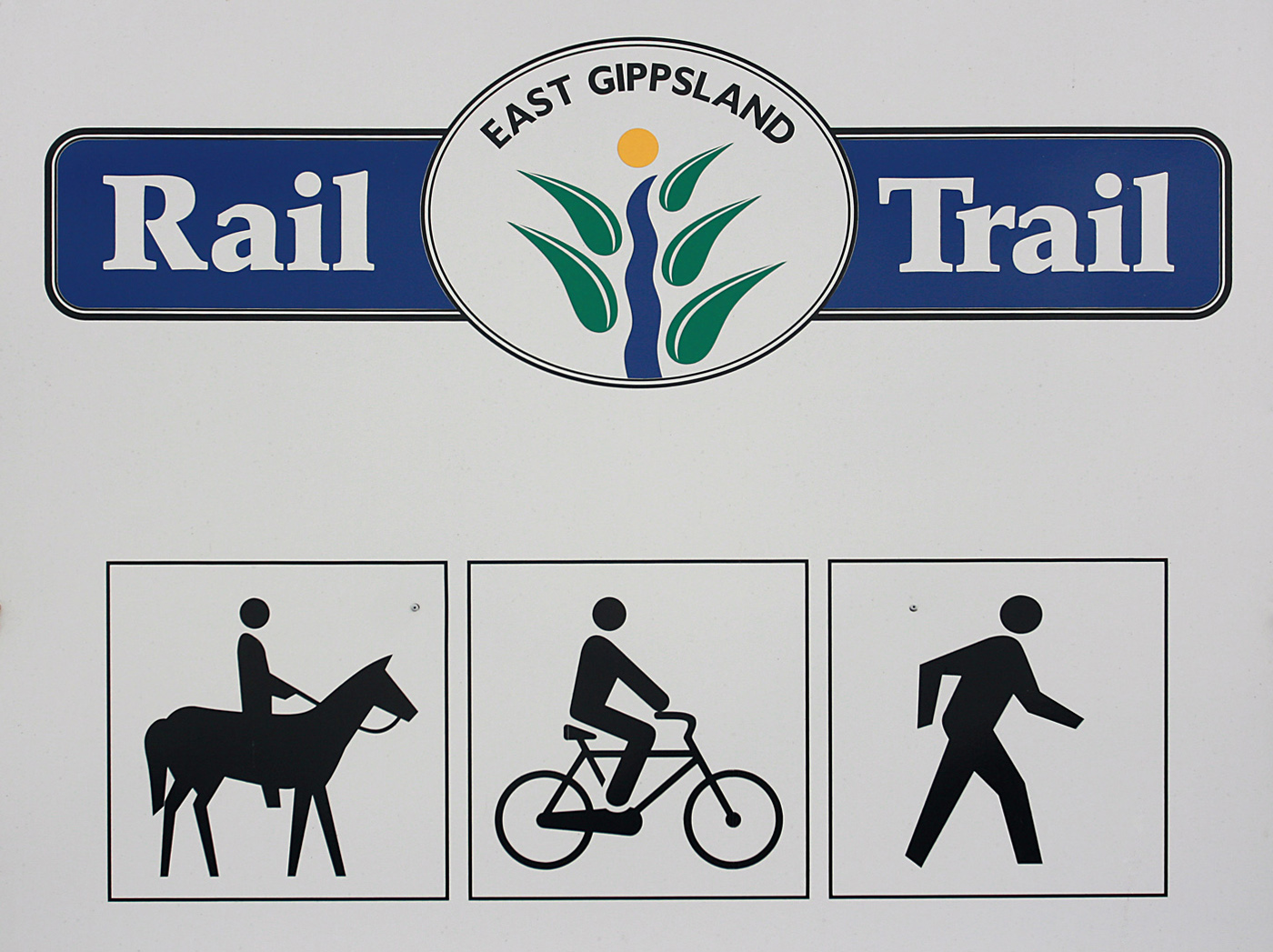
East Gippsland Rail Trail signage in Victoria, Australia indicating the shared trail usage

In the US, the 43-kilometre (27 mi) Cheshire Rail Trail, in New Hampshire, can be used by hikers, horseback riders, snowmobilers, cross-country skiers, cyclists, or even dog-sledders. In Canada, following the abandonment of the Prince Edward Island Railway in 1989, the government of Prince Edward Island purchased the right-of-way to the entire railway system. The Confederation Trail was developed as a tip-to-tip walking and cycling gravel rail trail which doubles as a monitored and groomed snowmobile trail during the winter months, operated by the PEI Snowmobile Association.

== See also ==
- Backpacking
- Fastpacking
- Freedom Trail (South Africa) – a mountain bike trail
- Greenway
- Historic roads and trails
- International Appalachian Trail
- List of longest cross-country trails
- List of long-distance footpaths
- List of long-distance hiking tracks in Australia
- Long-distance trails in the United States
- Long Distance Walkers Association – a UK nonprofit
- Multi-day race
- New Zealand tramping tracks
- Pilgrimage
- Thru-hiking
- Ultramarathon
- Walking
- Walking in the United Kingdom

== Bibliography ==
- Alan Booth, The Roads to Sata: A Two-Thousand-Mile Walk Through Japan (1985).
- Patrick Leigh Fermor, A Time of Gifts (1977), Between the Woods and the Water (1986), and The Broken Road (2013); describes a walk across Europe in the 1930s.
- John Hillaby Journey to the Jade Sea (1964); an account of an African walking tour using camels as pack animals.
  - Journey through Britain (1968). From Land's End to John o' Groats.
  - Journey through Europe (1972).
  - Journey to the Gods (1991); describes a tour through the mountains of Greece.
- George Meegan, The Longest Walk – Odyssey of the Human Spirit (1988); describes an unbroken walk from Tierra del Fuego at the southernmost tip of South America to the northern coast of Alaska at Prudhoe Bay between 1977 and 1983.
- Rory Stewart, The Places in Between (2006); recounts a walk across Afghanistan in 2002, after the Russians had left.
- Bill Bryson, A Walk in the Woods (1998); an account of the author's partial completion of the Appalachian Trail
- Laurie Lee, As I Walked Out One Midsummer Morning; an account of Lee walking from his family home in the Cotswolds to London, and then across Spain before the outbreak of the Spanish Civil War.
