= Youth Hostels Association of India =

Indian youth hostel organization

Youth Hostels Association India
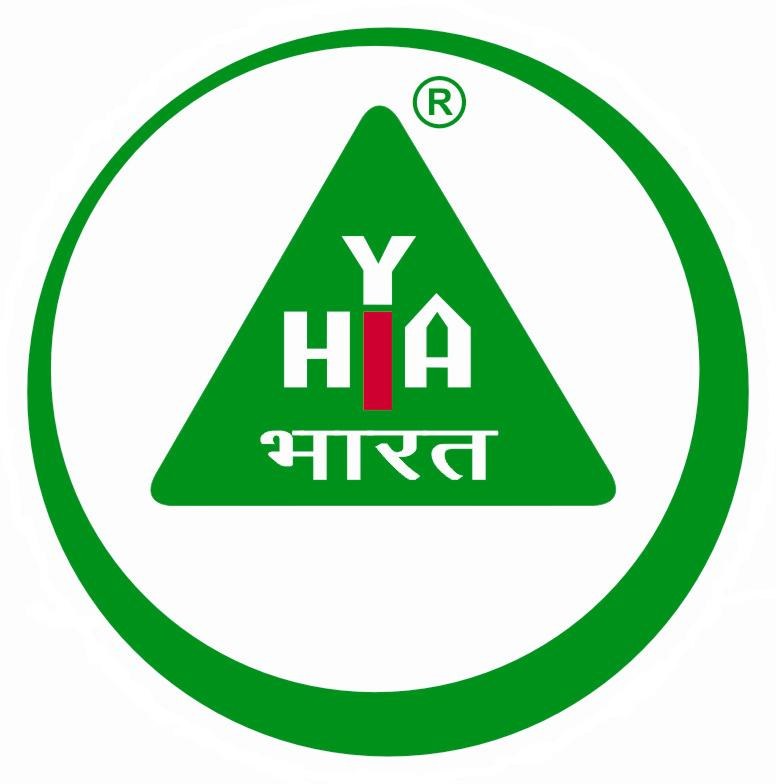
- Abbreviation: YHA India
- Formation: 1946
- Type: Voluntary sector
- Legal status: Non Profit
- Purpose: Youth Accommodation, Adventure Sports
- Headquarters: New Delhi
- Location: India
- Region served: India
- Members: Individuals and community groups
- Chairman: Rashmikant C Chippa
- Main organ: Hostelling International
- Parent organization: IYHF
- Staff: 25
- Volunteers: 10000
- Website: https://www.yhaindia.org

The Youth Hostels Association of India (YHAI) is an organization that provides youth hostel accommodation in India. It is a member of the Hostelling International federation.

== History ==
=== Formation ===
The concept of youth hostels was started in Germany in 1909 by Richard Schirrmann and it took 40 years for the ideas to reach fruition in the India. The Youth Hostel Movement had found its way into India before the partition of the country in 1947. The idea was introduced in early forties by the Boy Scouts and Girls Guides of India, Punjab Circle and the first Youth Hostel was formally opened at Tara Devi near Shimla on 9 June 1945 by H E Sir Bertrand Glancy, Chief Scout and Governor of the Punjab.

In 1949, some enthusiasts in Mysore set up a Committee for promotion of the Movement. Three years later the Indian Association received Associate membership of IYHF. The first National Conference of the Youth Hostels Association of India (YHAI) was held in 1956 in Delhi which marked the establishment of the movement on a national level.

On 5 October 1970, National Youth Hostel Trust was created through a Resolution passed by the National Council of YHAI, a day earlier. As a result, a 120-bed Youth Hostel complex in Chanakyapuri, New Delhi with Administrative Offices came into existence. Later a Training Centre equipped with audiovisual aids and Recreation Centre with indoor games and library facilities were added. The Training Centre has since been approved by IYHF for training of international participants.

The Plan for constructing youth hostels by YHAI was taken up and the first Youth Hostel built with its own resources on a donated piece of land was a small 35-bed youth hostel at Jagjit Nagar near Kasauli. An international camp of volunteers helped to construct its foundation. Gopalpur-on-Sea, Ganjam, Odisha was the next one built by YHAI in 1961. Some State Branches and Units are in the process of procuring land for construction of Youth Hostels.

Ever since its inception it has been known as YHA using the abbreviation YHAI when necessary to distinguish it from other associations.

As its charitable objective YHAI stated it as

"Our Mission is to enable and promote travel, tourism, adventure spirit, national integration and Education & health by providing hostels of good standards to millions of youth of limited means during their travel at affordable rates on a sustainable basis and by organizing adventure and educational events and to develop understanding among youth about social & developmental issues".

=== Early years ===
The first hostel to open was at Chanakya Puri in New Delhi in December 1977. All hostels provided accommodation in single sex dormitories. Self-catering facilities were provided at all hostels and many hostels provided a meals service. The hostel was run by a manager known as a warden and all the hostels in an area were administered by a number of National Councils. A National Office to co-ordinate policy and standards.

Membership was required to stay at a hostel and all people staying at a hostel were required to assist in the running of the hostel by undertaking what were known as 'duties'. These ranged from washing up, to cleaning the hostel. Bedding was supplied. The sheet sleeping bag was used from the outset and supplemented by pillows and blankets. The emphasis was very much on a8 communal atmosphere within each hostel. The use of dormitory accommodation and common rooms in every hostel reinforced this.

=== Reform ===
Significant modernization of hostels had occurred during the 2000s but by the late 2000s it became clear to YHAI that it needed to change as the stresses and strains of running what was a large organisation began to show on what was almost entirely a volunteer-run body. Direct management of the hostels was removed from the regional committees and a professional management structure was put in place.

As well as upgrading facilities in existing hostels, other experimental approaches to attracting young travelers were made. In 2010 a hostels renovation was done to bring the standards on par with international standards for the commonwealth games.

2010 saw a change in the charitable objective of the association. YHAI announced the largest plan of network renewal. As of now there are 50+ franchisee hostels and YHAI regularly monitors all its hostels to establish if they are still viable and if necessary closes those that are no longer viable or have no prospects of becoming viable again in the future. However the network renewal project was on top of this regular review and was a proposal to increase the network to more than 100 by 2011. The aim of the exercise was to reduce borrowing and to provide funds for re-investment into the network. The hostels involved were not necessarily poor performers but ones where the amount of investment required to bring them up to a desired standard was excessive, or in some cases because the site value was very high.

In 2003 as part of the move towards raising standards, the sheet sleeping bag was replaced by a bedding pack comprising a bottom sheet, duvet cover and two pillow cases. Duties have also disappeared although hostel users are encouraged to maintain the communal spirit and assist staff by cleaning up after themselves

=== Membership ===
It is required to be either a member of YHAI or a member of an Hosteling International affiliated association before staying at a hostel. Membership can be purchased on arrival at a hostel but a non member wishing to stay must pay a supplement equivalent to a day membership.

MEMBERSHIP TYPES

1. Individual (Prices inclusive of GST and Postage charges)

How to get	Junior	1 year	2 years	Life membership
Membership Fee on Counter at National Office, New Delhi	==== ₹100 ====	==== ₹200 ====	₹350	==== ₹3000 ====
Membership Fee through Post	₹120	₹250	==== ₹350 ====	₹3050
Membership Fee through Online Application Form	₹100	₹250	₹350	₹3060

Note: Calendar year is applicable for YHAI memberships i.e. January to December.

2. YHAI- IYTC Co Branded Membership

This membership is valid for 1 year in which, a person gets dual membership of YHAI & IYTC (International Youth Travel Card), that includes more than ₹40,000 worth discounts on accommodation, food, entertainment and many other categories, all over the world. Moreover, the membership is endorsed by the UNESCO.

There is an upper age limit of 30 yr. to apply for this membership. Both the benefits of YHAI and IYTC are applied to this membership type, internationally.

YHAI- IYTC MEMBERSHIP (11- 30 YEARS) (for 1 YEAR) : ₹900

3. Institutional membership (Prices inclusive of GST)

	1 year	5 years
Until 18 years	₹1000	₹4000
Above 18 years	₹2000	₹8000

=== Alcohol ===
The consumption of alcohol on hostel premises has never been allowed since the inception.

=== Schools ===
Groups of children aged 11–18 are welcome at hostels as long as they were under the supervision of a responsible leader. All bookings had to be made in advance. Apart from price no other concession was made to these groups. As such a large proportion of YHAI business involves children it has a stringent child protection policy and all staff and volunteers have to have checks conducted before they can work for YHAI.

== YHAI today ==
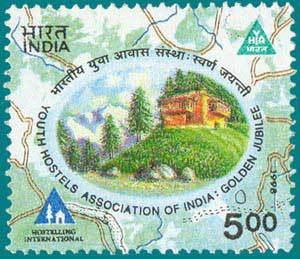
Youth Hostels Association of India golden jubilee postage stamp, 1998

YHAI is a member of Hostelling International, an international federation of hostel associations. Due to its work in various fields, e.g. youth activity, the environment, education, it work in partnership with a wide variety of other organizations both within the voluntary sector, national government and local government.

=== Products / Adventure Sports ===
YHAI remains primarily an accommodation provider and supports this with the provision of food and drink, educational packages to support school groups using hostels and since 1970's. As a part of increasing tourism and youth travelling YHAI organizes several units via the National Office at Delhi and through its state offices. The trekking events are –

1. Sar Pass Trek
2. Saurkundi Pass Trek
3. Mountain Biking
4. Family camping
5. Nature Study – Dobhi
6. Kedarkanta
7. Mountain Biking
8. Valley of Flowers trek
9. Great Lakes of Kashmir
10. Hamta Pass and Chandratal
11. Roopkund Trek

=== Accommodation ===
The dormitories (shared accommodation as YHAI calls it) in hostels typically consist of a number of beds, often bunk beds, and many offer storage facilities such as lockers. Such rooms are a means of being able to offer cheaper accommodation for large numbers of people and typically contain 4 – 8 beds. Unlike some associations e.g. Canada, dormitories in India are always unisex. With the YHA's modernising efforts and its attempt to widen its target market many hostels now offer private rooms in sizes suited to couples and families. An increasing number of rooms are being provided with en suite facilities.

=== Facilities ===
As of March 2009 YHAI operates 190 hostels and bunkhouses in addition to over 30 camping barns. All but ten hostels provide self-catering facilities and 140 provide a meals service. Nearly all provide drying rooms and cycle storage. The communal areas remain a major focus of the hostels. Many of the medium and larger hostels have classrooms and meeting rooms which can be used in conjunction with a residential stay or on a non residential basis.

=== Environment ===
One aim of the YHAI is to support "sustainable use of the countryside, youth hostels and their local communities". YHAI strives to operate as both an environmentally friendly user and to provide environmental education.

=== Volunteering ===
There are a wide variety of volunteering opportunities support by YHA. These range from running camps, trekking expeditions and serving as medical officer etc.

=== Governance ===
YHAI is governed by national council with a President, Chairman and four National Vice Presidents elected via state units and branches. Each state unit elects a group of members to represent the needs and views of YHAI members and users. These state units also elect the majority of the National Executive Council Meeting (NEC) delegates. They also elect Trustees. A program of meetings is held around the country throughout the year. State units are able to put Motions to the National AGM as required.

The board of trustees which is elected at the AGM has up to 26 members. Of these four, the National Chairman, President, National Vice Presidents, Treasurer and Chief Executive Officer form the National Officers who act as an executive committee.
