= The Broken Road (travel book) =

2013 travel book by Patrick Leigh Fermor

- First edition
- Editor: Artemis Cooper, Colin Thubron
- Author: Patrick Leigh Fermor
- Cover artist: John Craxton, Ed Kluz
- Genre: Travel book
- Publisher: John Murray
- Publication date: 2013

The Broken Road (2013) is a travel book by British author Patrick Leigh Fermor. Published posthumously by John Murray, the book, edited and introduced by his biographer Artemis Cooper and travel writer Colin Thubron, narrates almost all of the final section of the author's journey on foot across Europe from the Hook of Holland to Constantinople in 1933 and '34.

The first book, A Time of Gifts (1977), narrates Leigh Fermor's journey as far as the Middle Danube. The second volume, Between the Woods and the Water (1986), begins with the author crossing the Mária Valéria bridge from Czechoslovakia into Hungary and ends when he reaches the Iron Gate, where the Danube formed the boundary between the Kingdom of Yugoslavia and Romania. He never published the third volume, but in 2011 Leigh Fermor's publisher, John Murray announced that it would publish the final volume, drawing from his diary at the time and an early draft that he wrote in the 1960s, subsequently releasing it in September 2013.

The cover design is by Ed Kluz; John Craxton who designed the other volumes, had died in 2009.
