= Mária Valéria Bridge =

Bridge in Hungary and Slovakia

Coordinates: 47°47′43″N 18°43′49″E

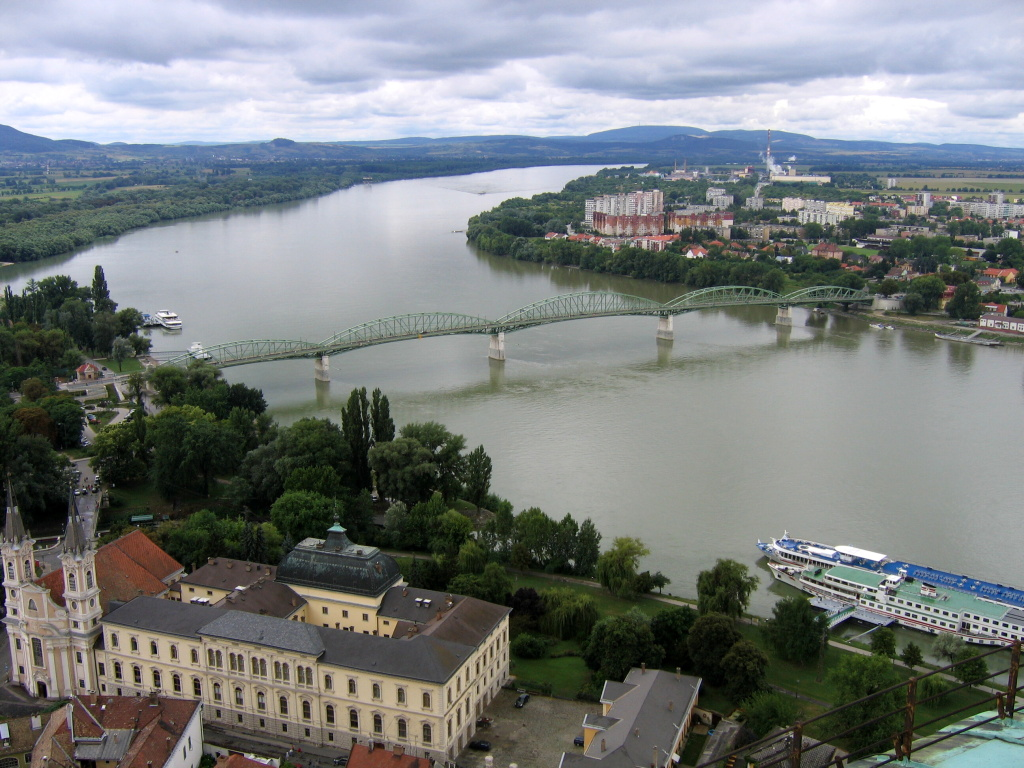
The Mária Valéria Bridge from Esztergom Basilica on the Hungarian side

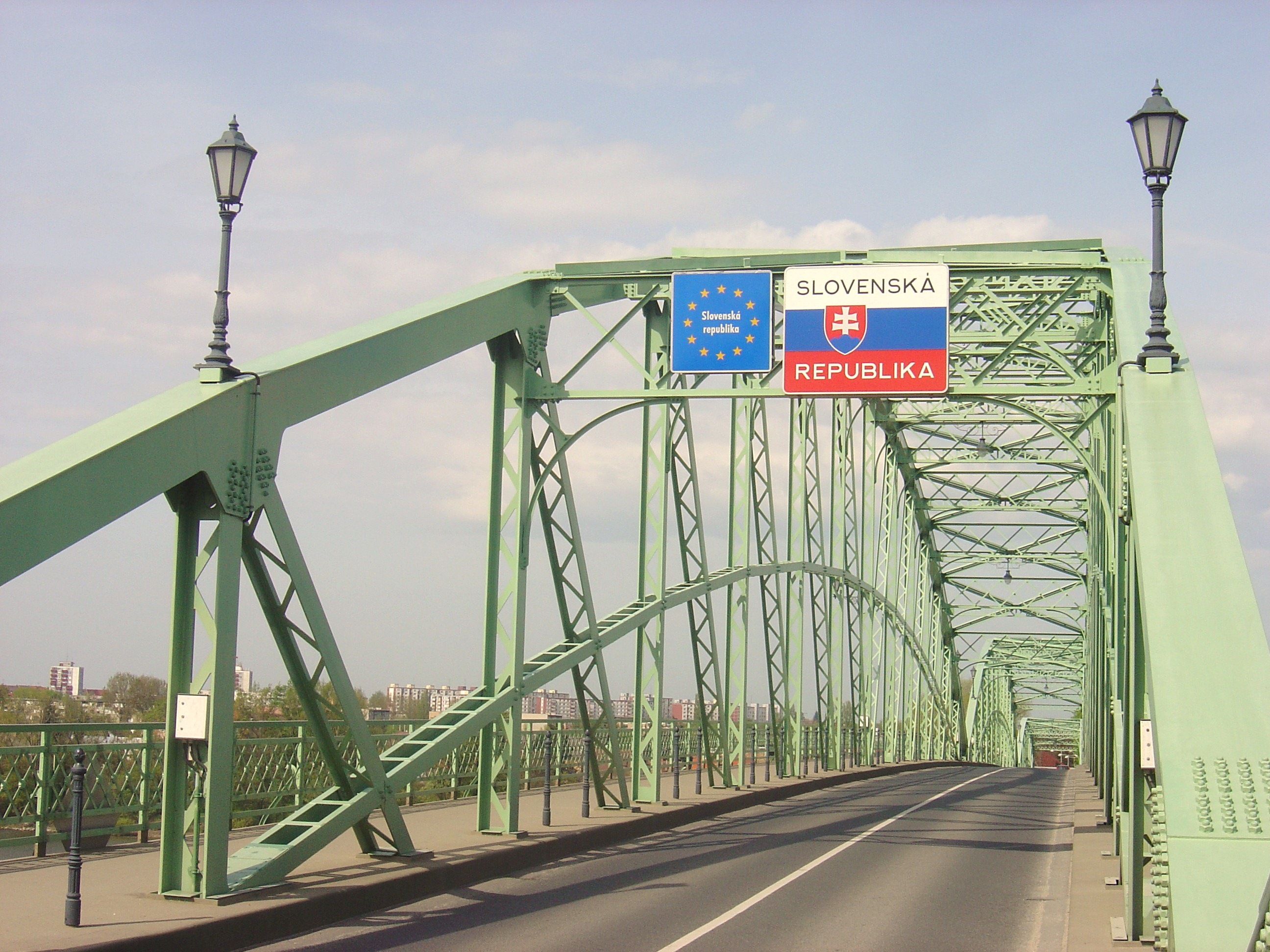
The border between Hungary and Slovakia on the middle of the bridge

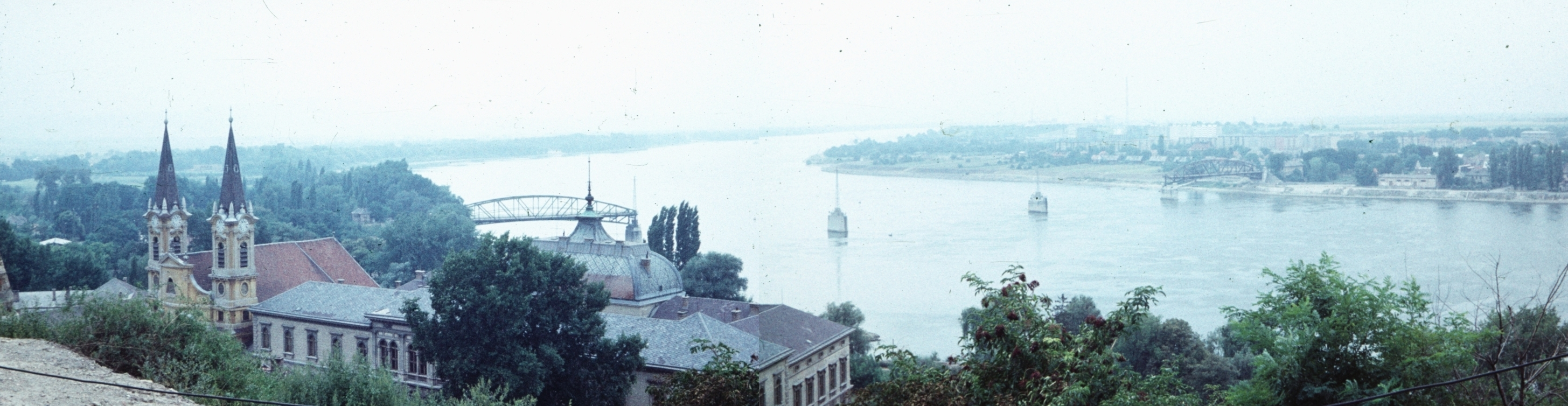
The bridge in 1969, with three spans missing

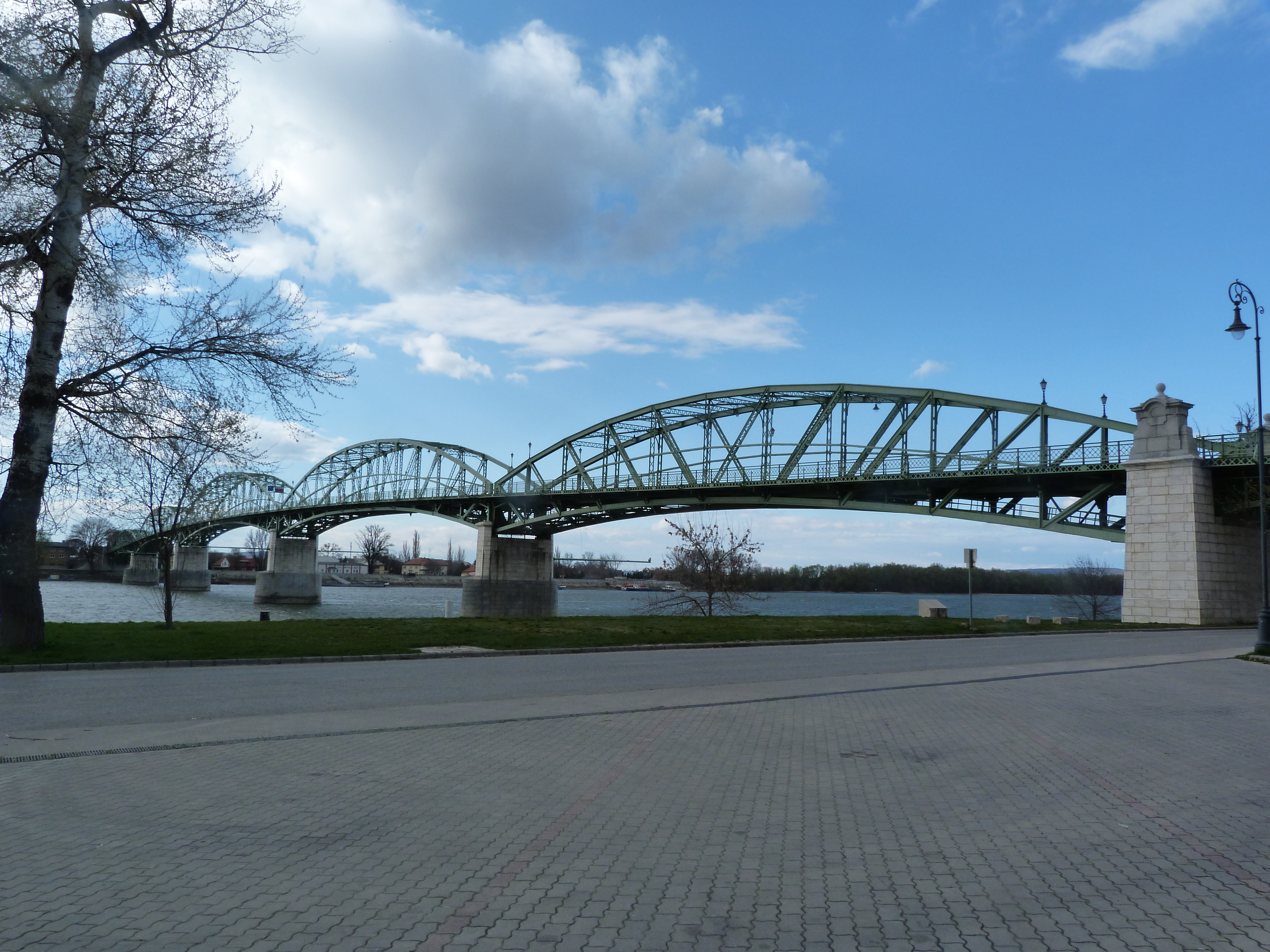
Mária Valéria Bridge

The Mária Valéria Bridge (Hungarian: Mária Valéria híd; Slovak: Most Márie Valérie) joins Esztergom in Hungary and Štúrovo in Slovakia, across the River Danube. The bridge is some 500 metres in length. It is named after Archduchess Marie Valerie of Austria (1868–1924), the fourth child of the Emperor of Austria-Hungary, Franz Josef and Elisabeth.

The bridge was designed by János Feketeházy in 1893; he built several bridges on the Danube, including the Liberty Bridge (originally the Franz Joseph Bridge) in Budapest and the Elisabeth Bridge between Komárno and Komárom. In 1920, according to the Treaty of Trianon, Párkány (present-day Štúrovo) became part of the newly formed Czechoslovakia, so the bridge was cut by the border. Since its opening on 28 September 1895, the bridge has been destroyed twice. On 22 July 1919 it was destroyed by a detonation caused by the occupying Czechoslovak Legion at its first pier on its western side, but was renovated in 1922 and completely reconstructed in 1926. During World War II, retreating German troops blew up the bridge on 26 December 1944 along with other bridges near Esztergom.

Decades of intransigence between the Communist governments of Hungary and Czechoslovakia meant that the bridge was not rebuilt until the new millennium, finally reopening on 11 October 2001. Half the costs of the project were covered by a 10 million Euro grant from the European Union, as part of the EU PHARE project to assist applicant countries in their preparations to join the EU. The re-opening was marked with the issue of a Slovak stamp. The rebuilding of the bridge helped the local economy in the Ister-Granum Euroregion.

As Slovakia and Hungary are part of the Schengen Area there are no border controls on the bridge. Both countries became part of the Schengen Area on 12 December 2007, allowing all immigration and customs checks to be lifted.

As a young man, the writer Patrick Leigh Fermor walked from the Hook of Holland to Constantinople in 1933/34. His book A Time of Gifts ends on the bridge and the second volume, Between the Woods and the Water, begins with his crossing into Esztergom.

== See also ==
- List of crossings of the Danube River
- List of international bridges
