= Between the Woods and the Water =

Travel book by Patrick Leigh Fermor

- Author: Patrick Leigh Fermor
- Release number: 2
- Publication date: 1986
- Preceded by: A Time of Gifts
- Followed by: The Broken Road

Between the Woods and the Water is a travel book by British author Patrick Leigh Fermor, the second in a series of three books narrating the author's journey on foot across Europe from the Hook of Holland to Constantinople in 1933/34.

The first book in the series, A Time of Gifts, recounts Leigh Fermor's journey as far as the Middle Danube. Between the Woods and the Water (1986) begins with the author crossing the Mária Valéria bridge from Czechoslovakia into Hungary and ends when he reaches the Iron Gate, where the Danube formed the boundary between the Kingdom of Yugoslavia and Romania. The planned third volume of Leigh Fermor's journey to its completion in Constantinople, The Broken Road, was not completed in his lifetime, but was finally published in September 2013.

Many years after his travel, Leigh Fermor's diary of the Danubian leg of his journey was found in a castle in Romania and returned to him. He used it in his writing of the book, which also drew on the knowledge he had accumulated in the intervening years.

== Honours ==
- 1986: Thomas Cook Travel Book Award
