= Edward Kluz =

English illustrator and printmaker

Ed Kluz
- Born: Suffolk, England
- Education: Winchester School of Art
- Known for: painting, illustrating, and printmaking
- Movement: Contemporary art
- Website: ed-kluz.co.uk

Ed Kluz (born 19 August 1980) is a British artist. His work explores our relationship with the past through notions of English Romanticism.

The thorough research and persistent evolution of Kluz's works has brought about experimentation and innovation with various media . His earlier work explored the material qualities of egg tempera and gum Arabic on gessoed panels. Most recently he has developed a distinctive paper collage technique which makes use of hand coloured papers and mixed media. He also produces screen prints and lino cuts.

He produced the illustrations for the 2015 Folio Society edition of the Selected Poems of Rupert Brooke.

== Life ==
Kluz, the eldest of three children, was born in Ipswich, Suffolk on August 19, 1980 and grew up in Swaledale, North Yorkshire. His parents, Andy (TV broadcaster) and Liz Kluz bought a derelict late 18th century farmhouse in the hamlet of Applegarth near the Yorkshire town of Richmond in 1985.

Kluz studied fine art painting at the Winchester School of Art between 1999 and 2002. His work during this period also focused on notions of the past, in particular the relationship between early photography and painting.

== Critical response ==
Kluz's work has received positive reviews, having been exhibited at St Jude's Gallery, The Scottish Gallery, Edinburgh, the Yorkshire Sculpture Park and Quercus Gallery.
