= Sar Pass Trek =

Sar Pass
- Mountain Pass
- Location within Himachal Pradesh Location within India
- Coordinates: 32.07°N 77.388455°E
- Country: India
- State: Himachal Pradesh
- District: Kullu
- Elevation: 4,220 m (13,850 ft)

Languages
  - Official: Hindi
  - Regional: Kulvi

Sar Pass Trek

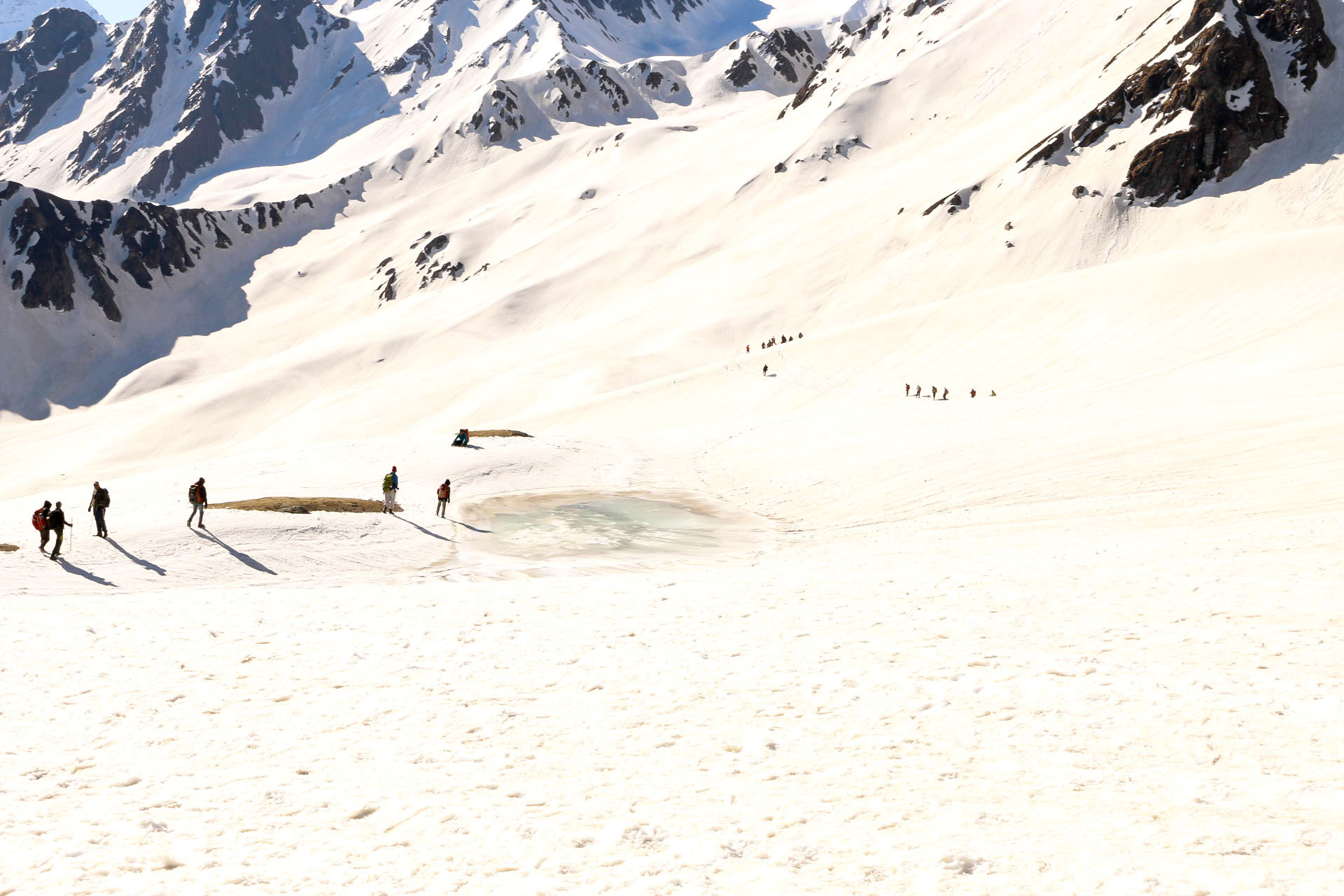
Frozen Lake - Sar

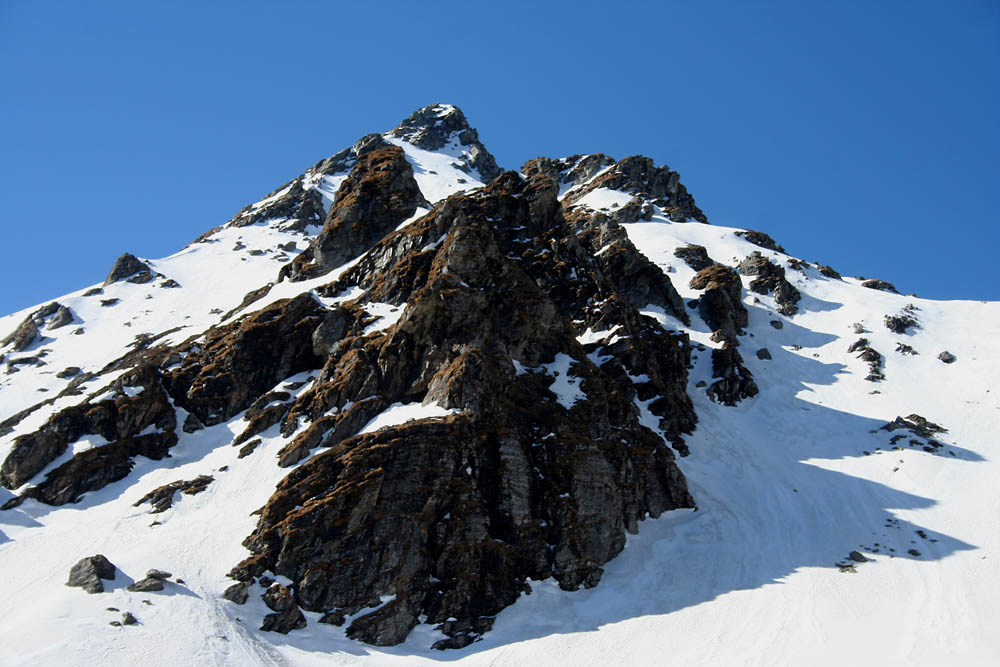
Sar Pass Top as seen from Sar Pass in Kullu district of Himachal Pradesh, India

The Sar Pass is in Parvati Valley of Kullu district of Himachal Pradesh, a state of India.

Sar, in the local dialect, means a lake. While trekking across the path from Tila Lotni to Biskeri Ridge, one has to pass by a small, usually frozen lake (Sar) and hence the name Sar Pass Trek.

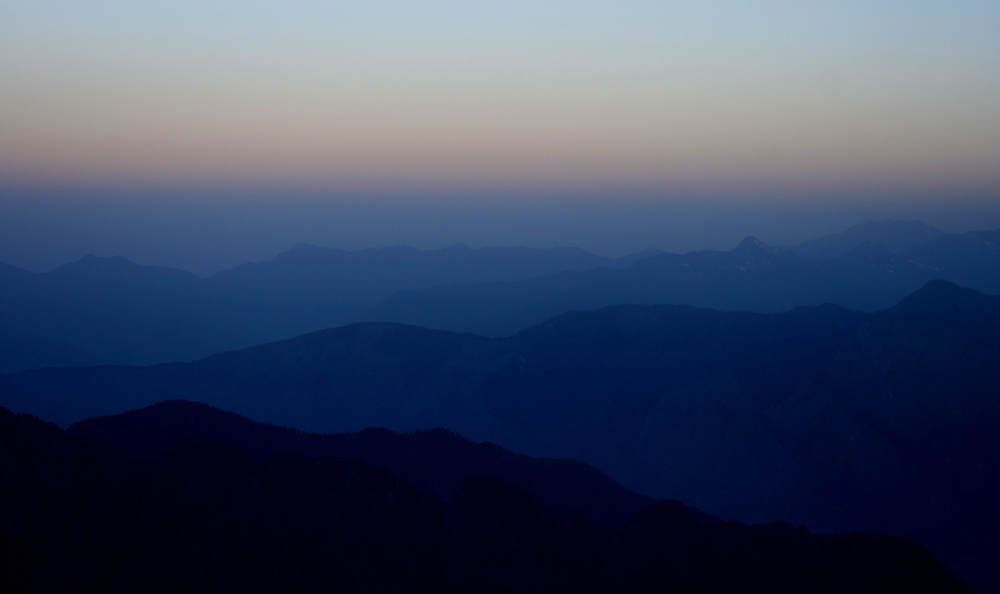
On way to Sar Pass - colours of the morning

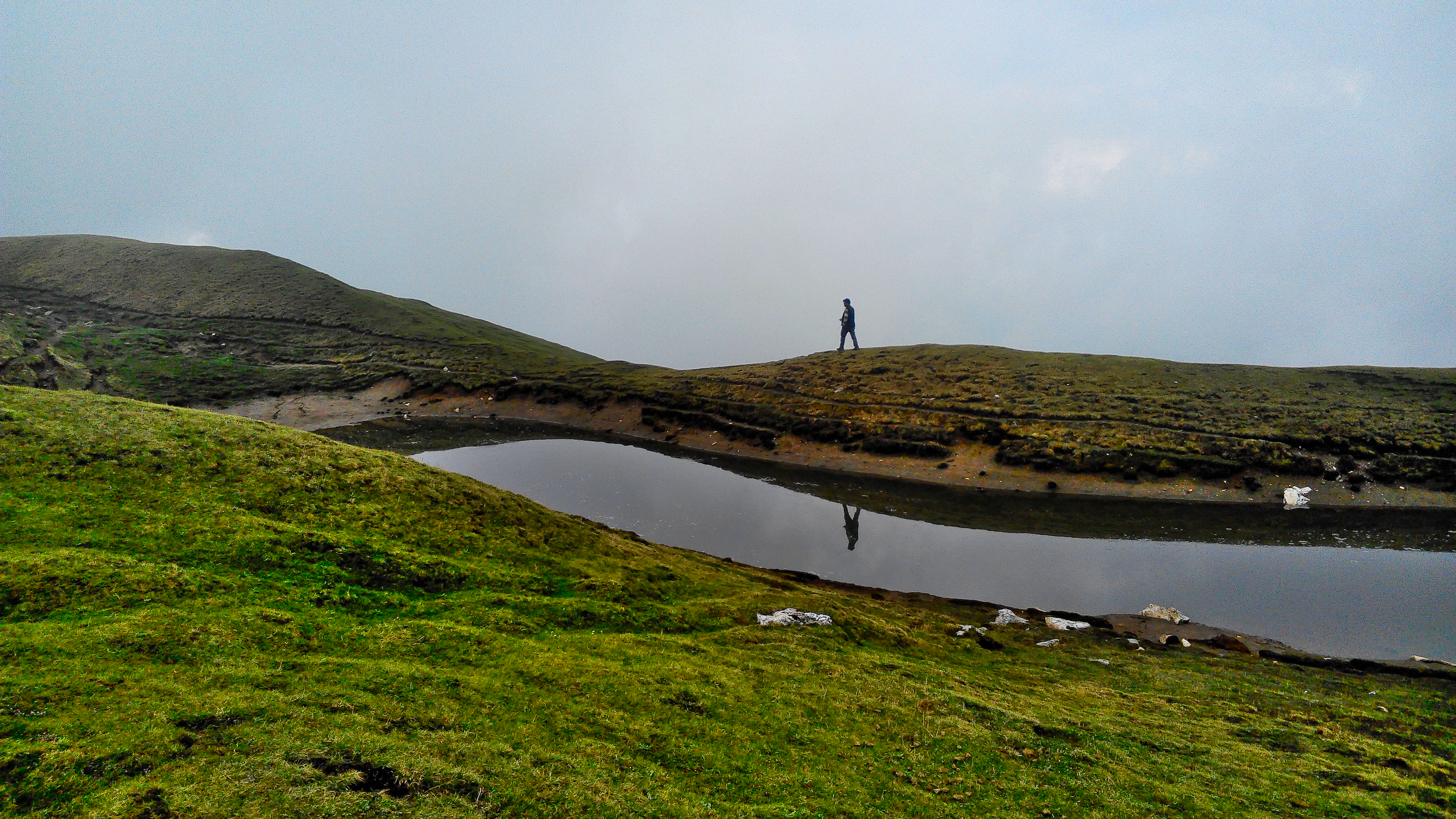
This is at 13,800 feet above sea level

== How To Reach ==
=== Air ===
The nearest airport Bhuntar Airport (IATA code KUU) is at Bhuntar town, situated on NH21 about 32.3 km (20.1 mi) south of Rumsu and 10 km (6.2 mi) south of Kullu town. The airport is also known as Kullu-Manali airport and has more than a kilometre long runway. Air India and some private airlines have regular flights to the airport. Recently Himalayan Bulls in collaboration with Deccan Charters have started flights on Kullu-Chandigarh-Kullu sector three times a day. Daily flight service (except Tuesday) has been started by 15 May 2013 at Bhunter airport by Air India from Delhi to Bhuntar and vice versa. Chandigarh Airport is the nearest international airport.

=== Road ===
Kasol is about 30 km from Bhunter, and Bhunter can be reached from Delhi by national highway NH 1 up to Ambala and from there NH 22 to Chandigarh and from there by National Highway 21 (NH 21) that passes through Bilaspur, Sundernagar, Mandi and Kullu towns. The road distance from Chandigarh to Manali is 316 km (196 mi), and the total distance from Delhi to Manali is 566 km (352 mi). Buses (including Volvo and Mercedes Benz) on this route are available from all major bus terminals.

=== Rail ===
Kasol is not easily approachable by rail. The nearest broad gauge railheads are at Chandigarh (275 km (171 mi)), Pathankot (325 km (202 mi)) and Kalka (310 km (193 mi)). The nearest narrow gauge railhead is at Joginder Nagar (135 kilometres (84 mi)).

See Bhanupli–Leh line for the proposed railway line through this area.

=== Gallery ===
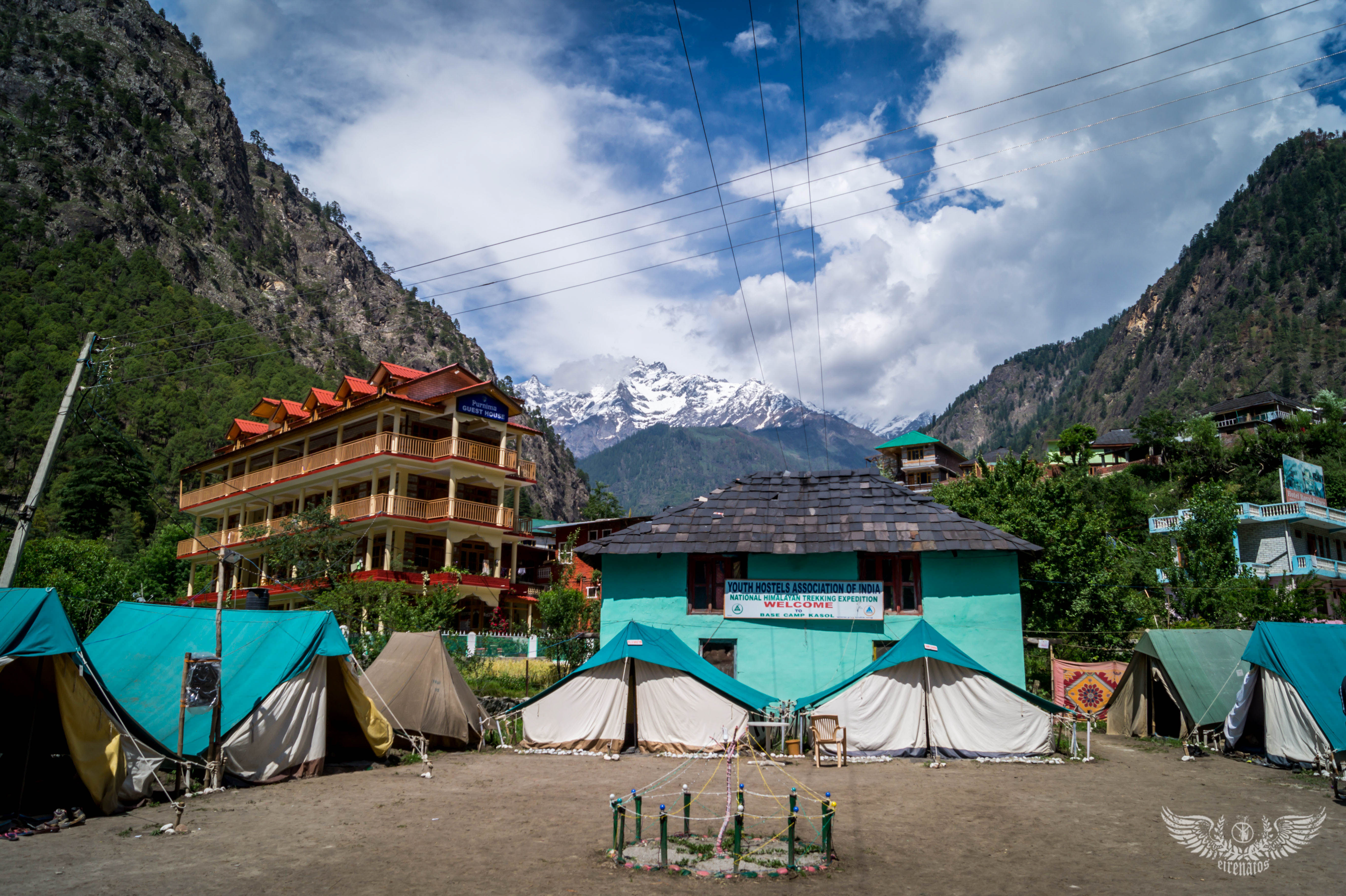
Kasol-Base Camp

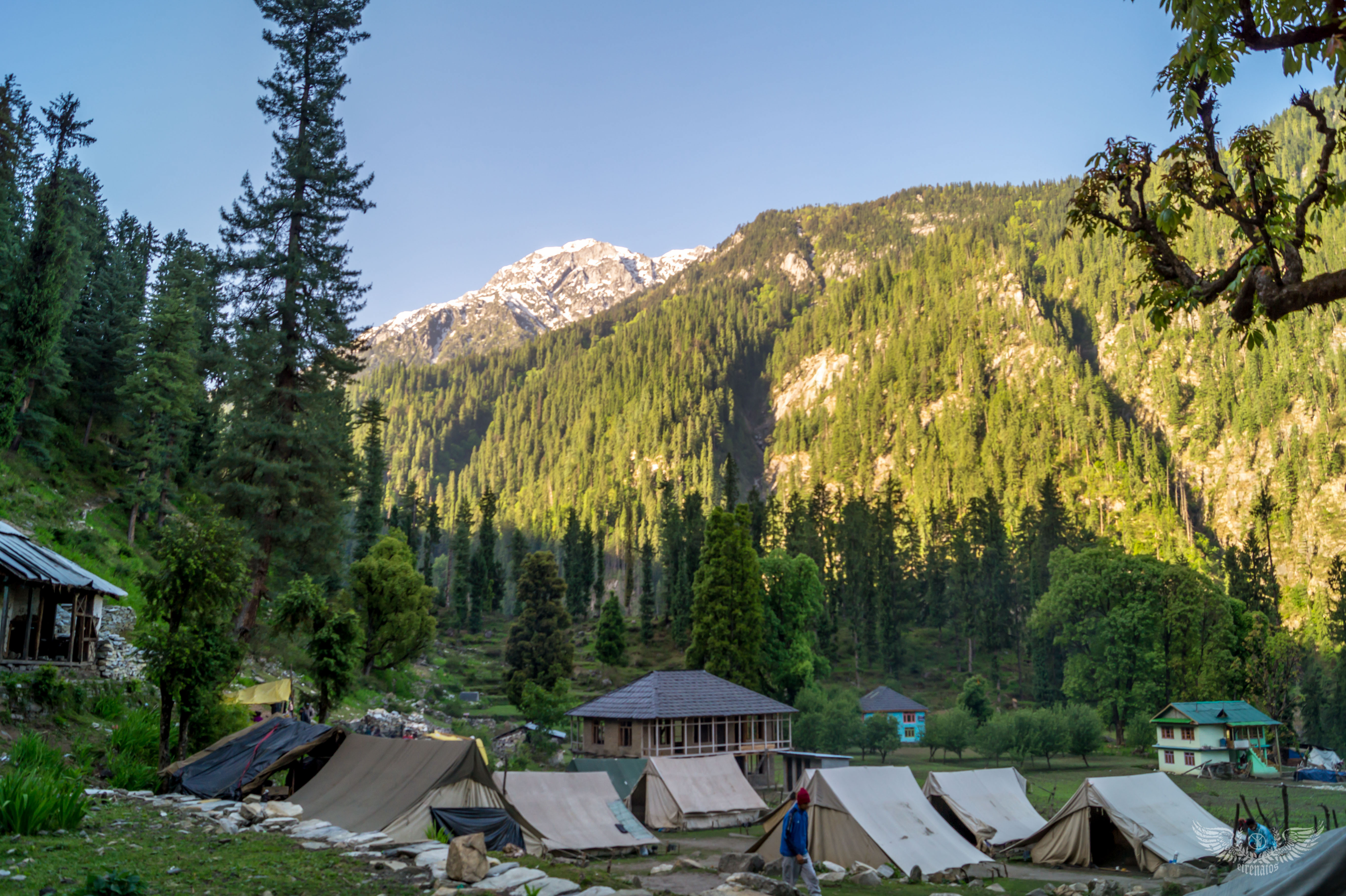
Grahan-Camp 2

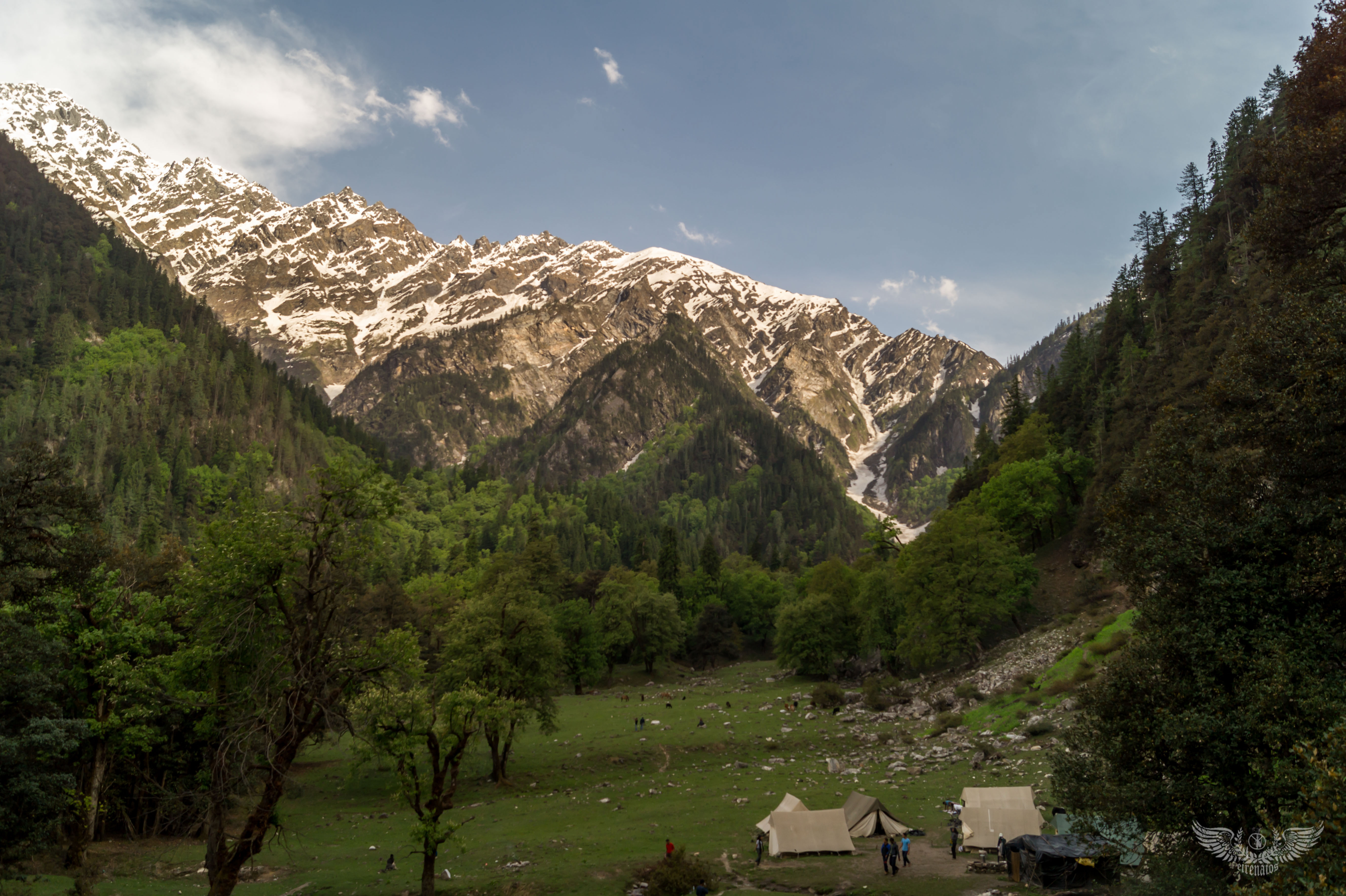
Padri-Camp 3

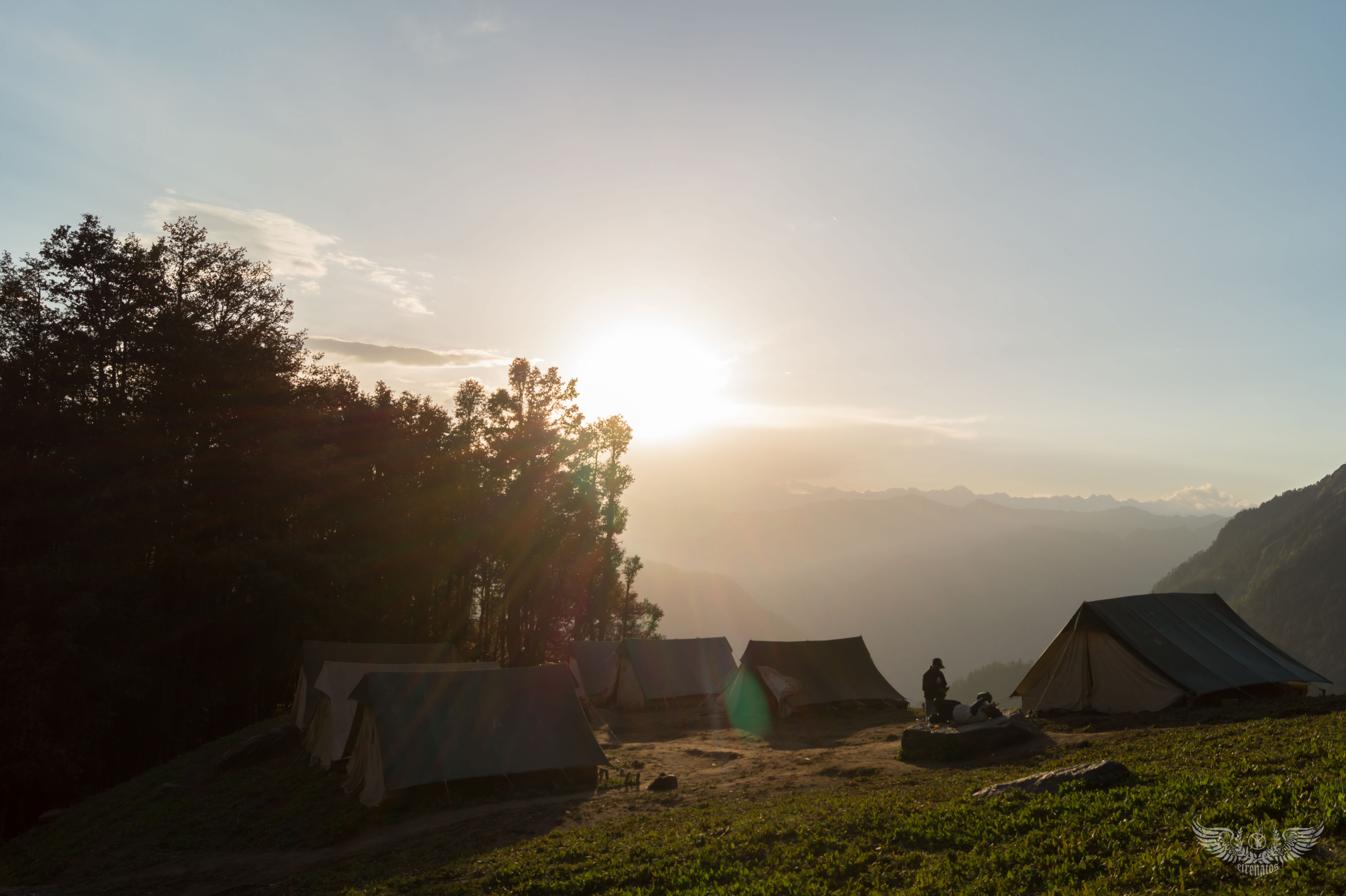
Minh Thatch-Camp 4

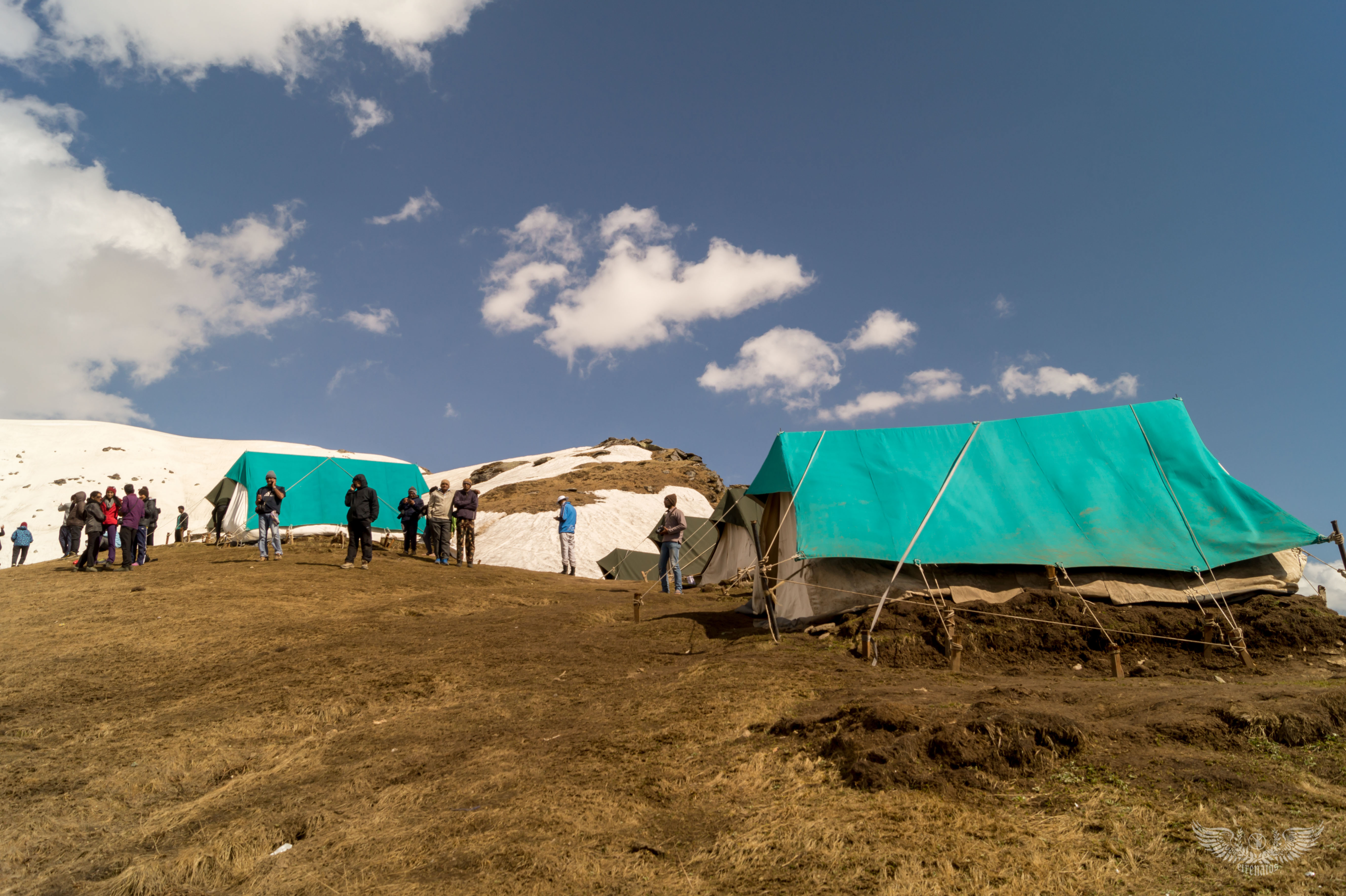
Nagaru-Camp 5

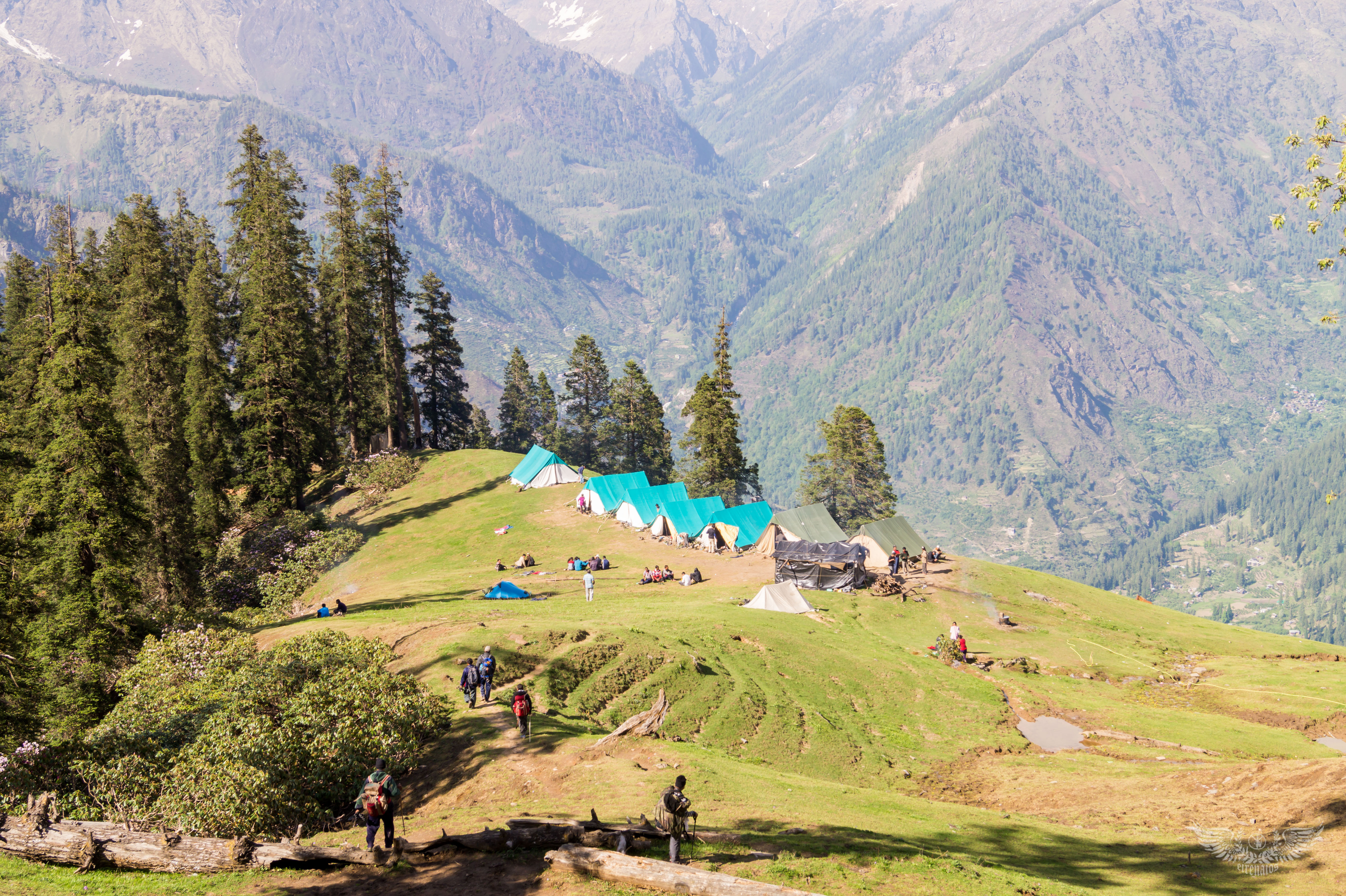
Biskeri-Camp 6

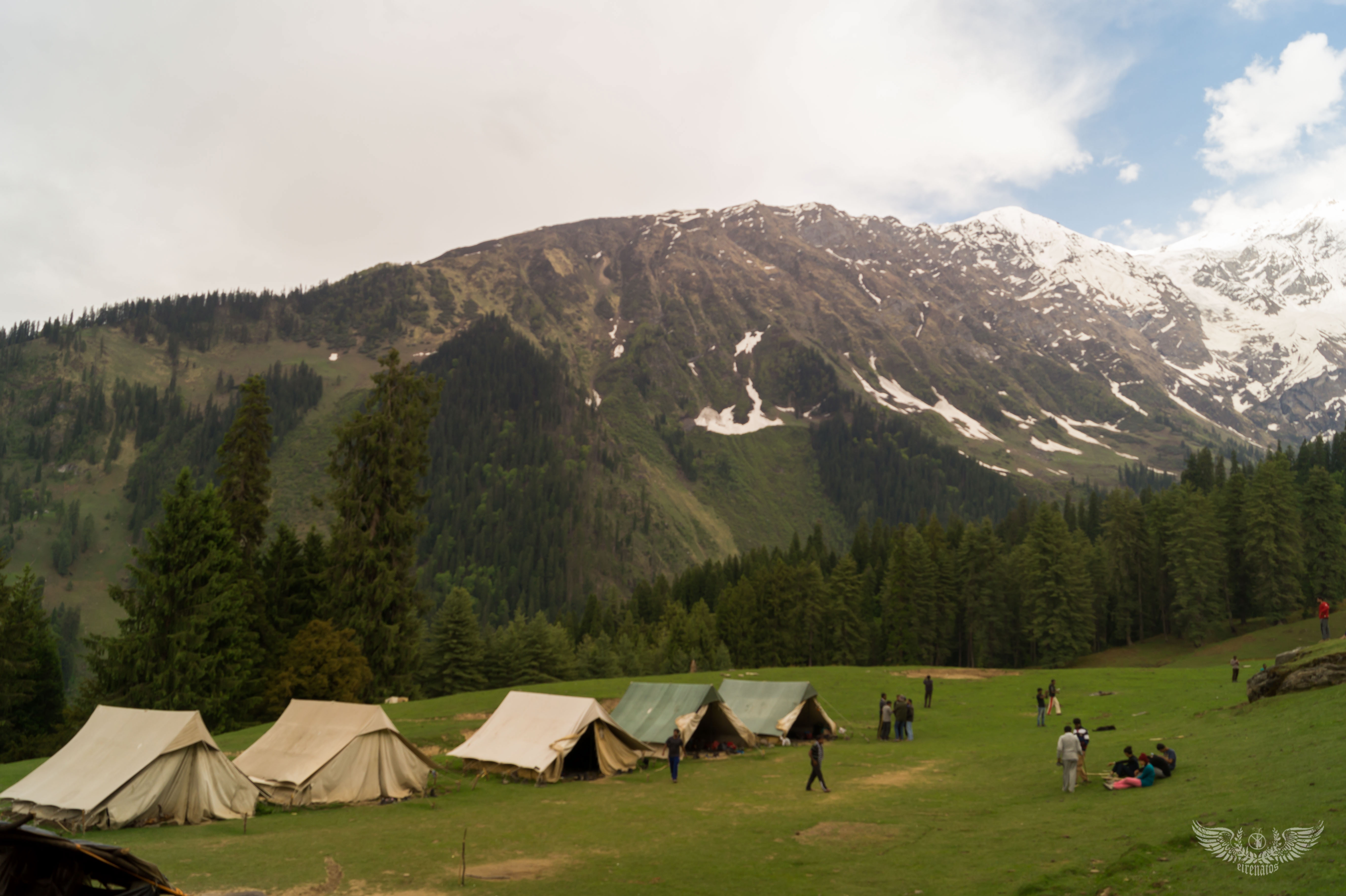
Bhandak Thatch-Camp 7

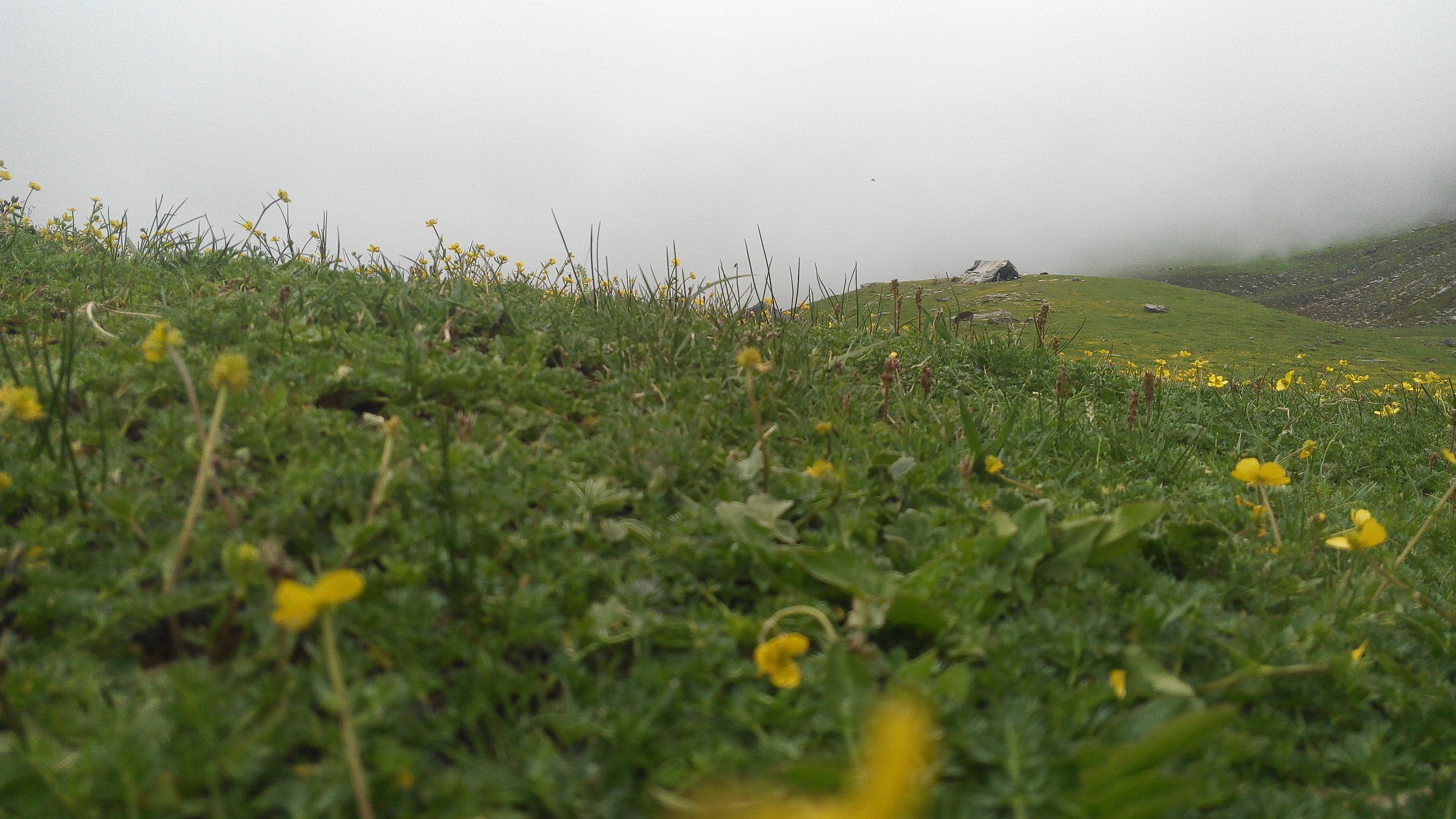
The descent from Sar Pass to Biskeri Thach

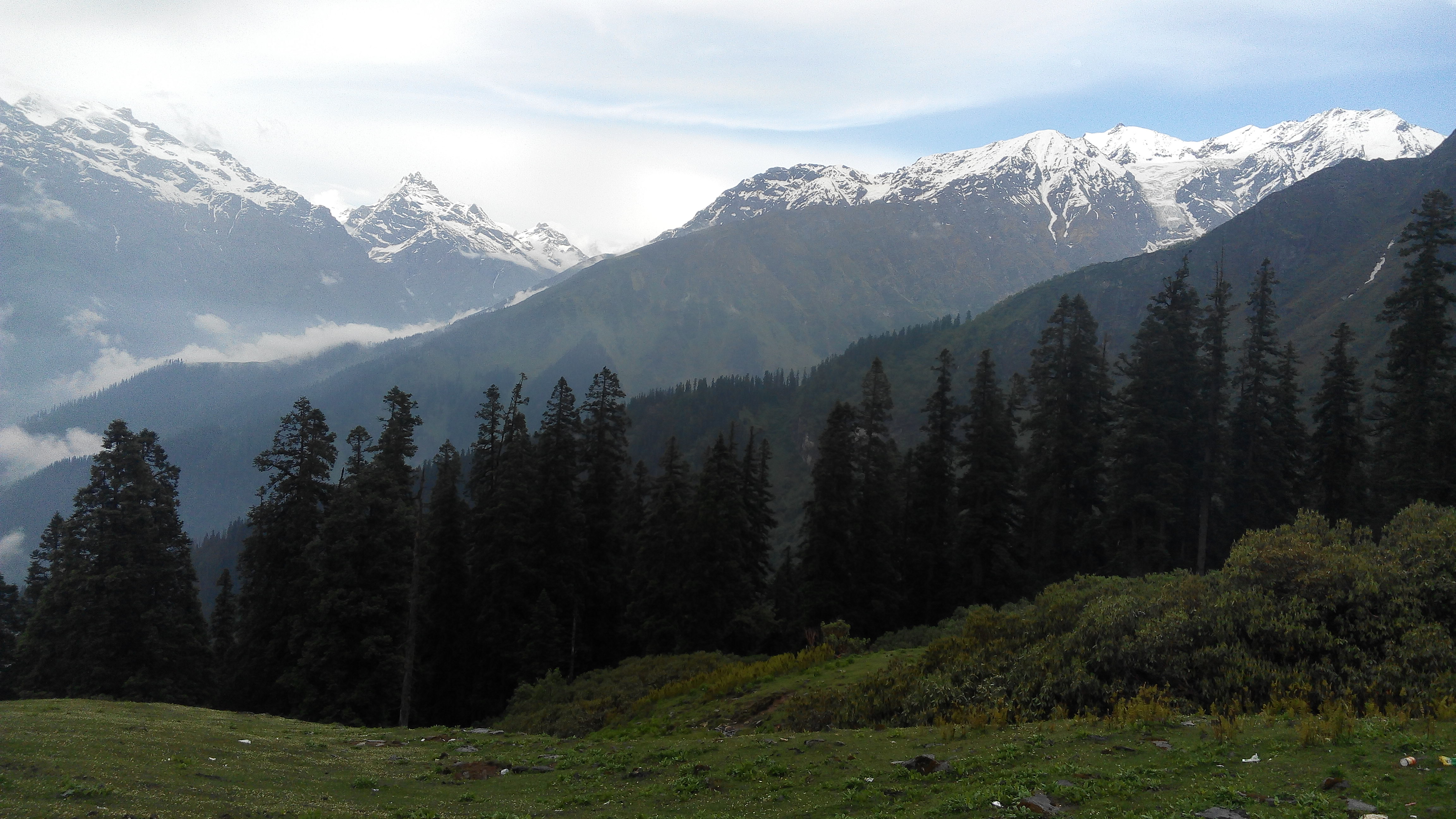
Camp at Biskeri Thach

=== View from Nagaru Camp (12,500ft) ===
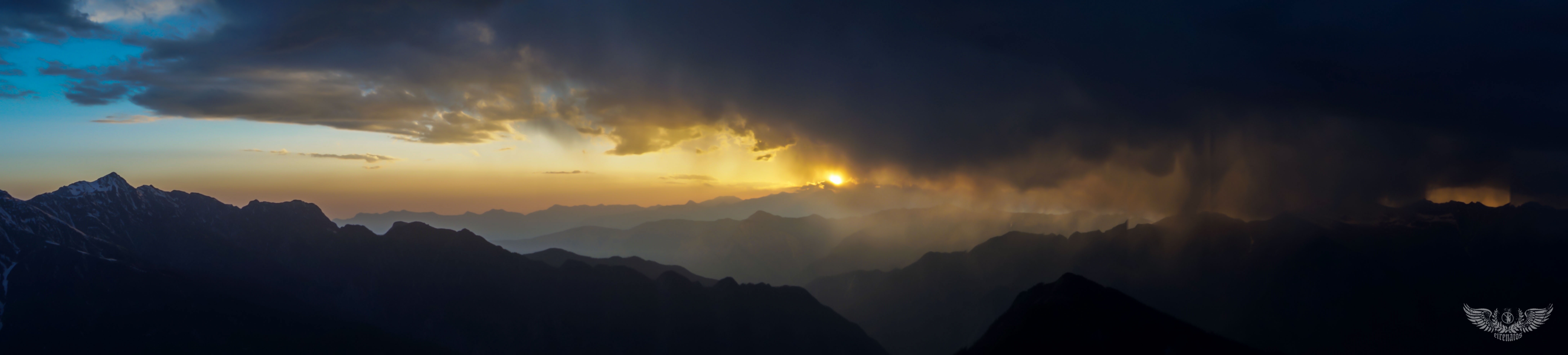
View from Nagaru

== See also ==
- Saurkundi Pass Trek
