= A Time of Gifts =

1977 travel book by Patrick Leigh Fermor

- First edition with artwork by John Craxton
- Author: Patrick Leigh Fermor
- Language: English
- Publication date: 1977

A Time of Gifts (1977) is a travel book by British author Patrick Leigh Fermor. Published by John Murray when the author was 62, it is a memoir of the first part of Leigh Fermor's journey on foot across Europe from the Hook of Holland to Constantinople (officially Istanbul) in 1933/34.

A Time of Gifts, whose introduction is a letter to his wartime colleague Xan Fielding, recounts Leigh Fermor's journey as far as the Middle Danube. A second volume, Between the Woods and the Water (1986), begins with the author crossing the Mária Valéria bridge from Czechoslovakia into Hungary and ends when he reaches the Iron Gate, where the Danube formed the boundary between the Kingdom of Yugoslavia and Romania. The final volume, The Broken Road, completes his journey to Constantinople; drawing from his diary and a draft that he wrote in the 1960s, it was edited by Artemis Cooper and published in 2013.

== Description ==
Many years after his travel, Leigh Fermor's diary of the Danubian leg of his journey was found in a castle in Romania and returned to him. He used it in his writing of the book, which also drew on the knowledge he had accumulated in the intervening years.

In the book, he conveys the immediacy of an 18-year-old's reactions to a great adventure, deepened by the retrospective reflections of the cultured and sophisticated man of the world which he became. He travelled in Europe when old monarchies survived in the Balkans, and remnants of the anciens régimes were to be seen in Austria, Czechoslovakia and Hungary. In Germany Hitler had recently come to power but most of his atrocities were not yet evident.

The title comes from "Twelfth Night", a poem by Louis MacNeice.

== Reception ==
The book has been hailed as a classic of travel writing. William Dalrymple called it a "sublime masterpiece". In 2024, The Economist described it as "arguably the greatest travel narrative ever written."

== Honours ==
- 1978: WH Smith Literary Award
