= Saurkundi Pass Trek =

Hiking trail in Himachal Pradesh, India

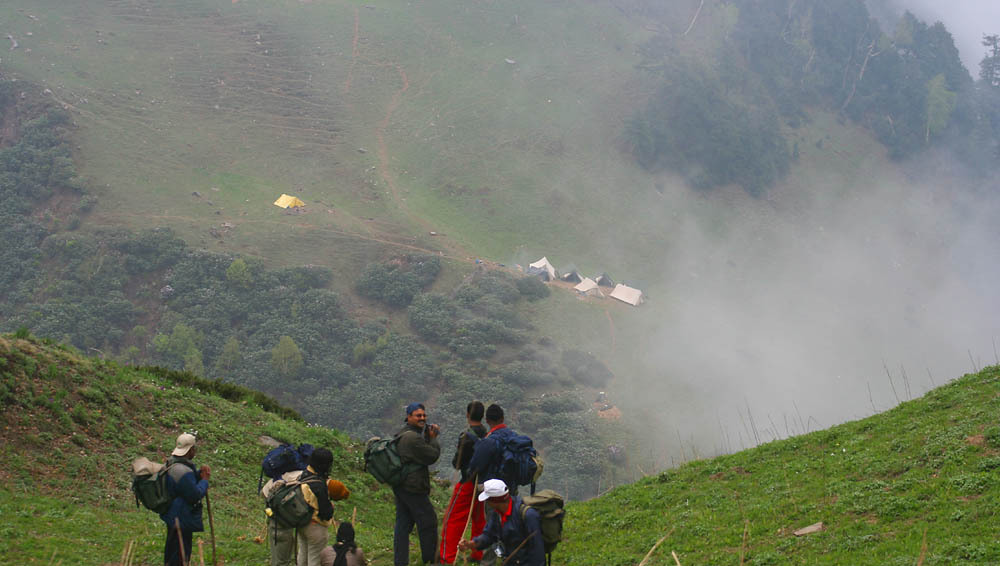
Camp site (Maylee Thatch) on way to Daura Thaatch

The Saurkundi Pass Trek is a hiking trail in the Kullu district of Himachal Pradesh, a state of northern India. The trek is an 11-day program and participants hike every day during the period. The groups range from 40 to 50 people (children below the age of 15 are not allowed). The trail starts at Babeli, the base camp, and passes through scenic spots in the Kullu valley.

== Base camp ==
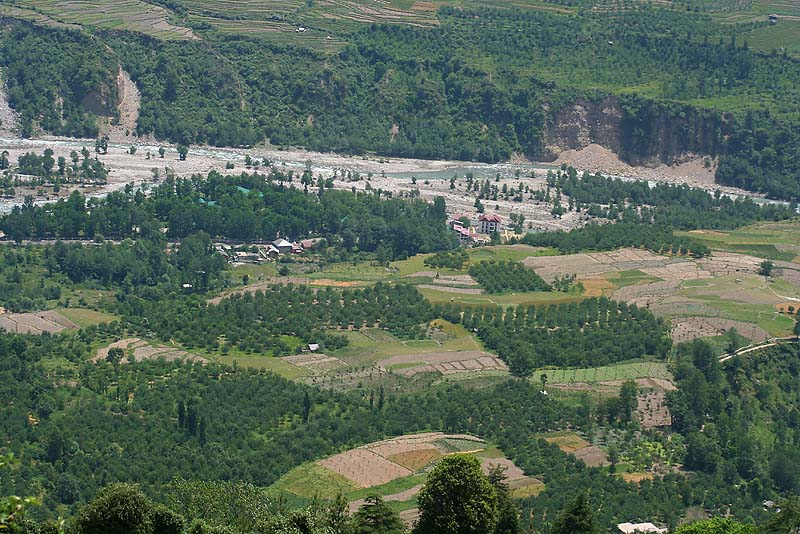
Fields and Beas River

The base camp is at Babeli (4000 feet), along the Kullu-Manali highway, about 7 kilometres from Kullu. It is connected by road from Kullu, which in turn is connected with Delhi, Chandigarh and other cities of Punjab. The base camp is situated along the Beas River.

Two days are set aside for orientation and acclimatization at base camp. This includes rappelling, rock climbing, and trekking in the forests.

== Trek ==
=== Segli ===
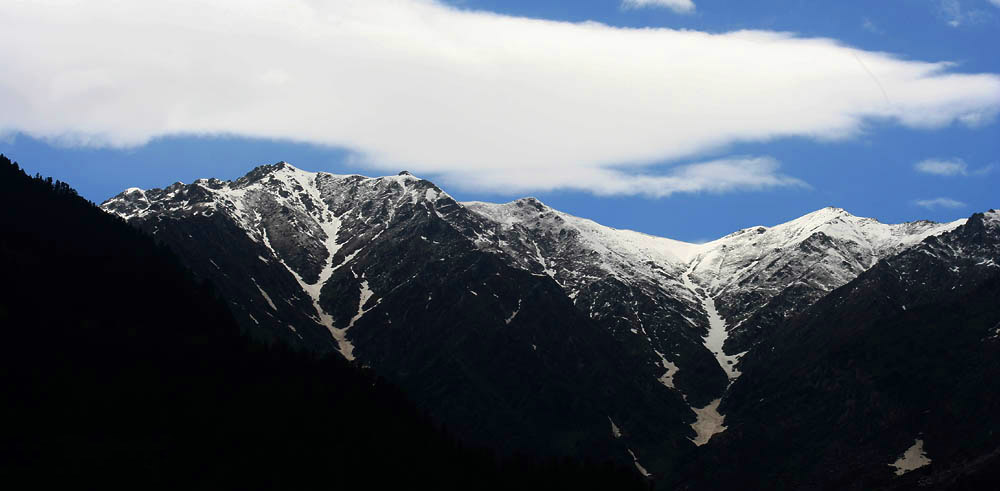
Fresh snow as seen on the way to Segli

Segli is the next camp at 7,100 feet after trekking up for about 8 kilometres from a point a few kilometers from Manali on Kullu- Manali Highway by Bus). The camp is in an apple orchard and is surrounded by forests.

=== Haura Thatch ===
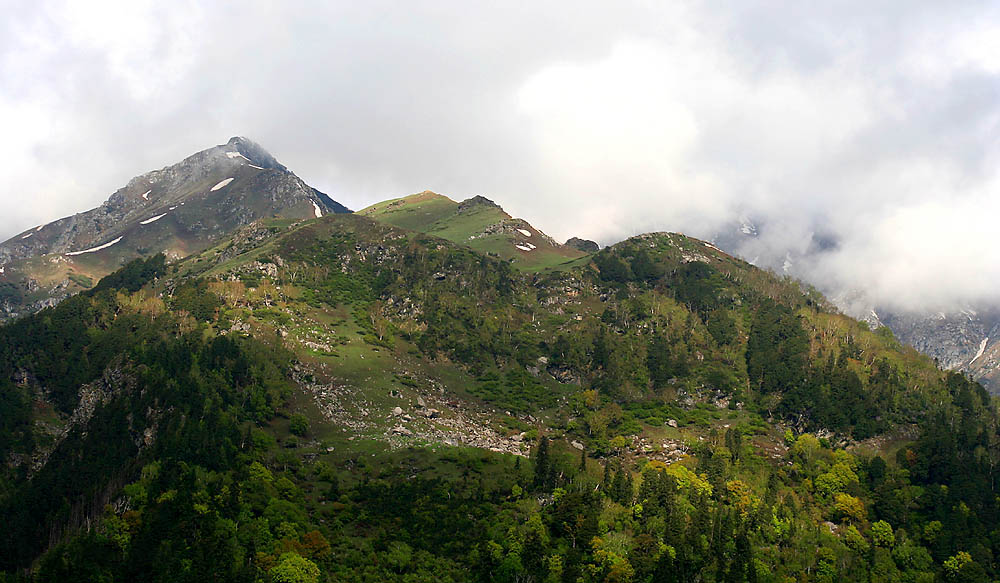
Haura Thaatch

The trekkers reach the next camp Haura Thatch (9,000 feet) after trekking for about 10 kilometres. The camp is in a dense forest where little light penetrates.

=== Maylee Thatch ===
After 6 km of trekking, the camp at Maylee Thatch (10,500 feet) is reached.

=== Doura Thatch ===
After trekking for about 10 kilometres through the clouds and trekking on snow for the first time, trekkers reach the next camp at Doura Thatch (11,300 feet). The day's trek is a journey through the clouds.

=== Saurkundi Pass ===
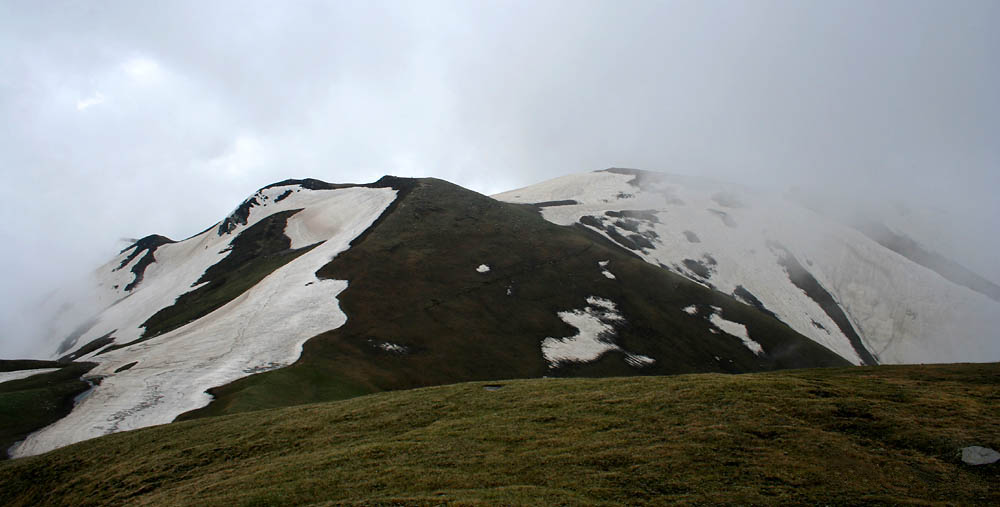
A view from Saurkundi Pass

The next day's trek is through the snow or alongside snow. Trekkers next reach Saurkundi Pass (12,900 feet).

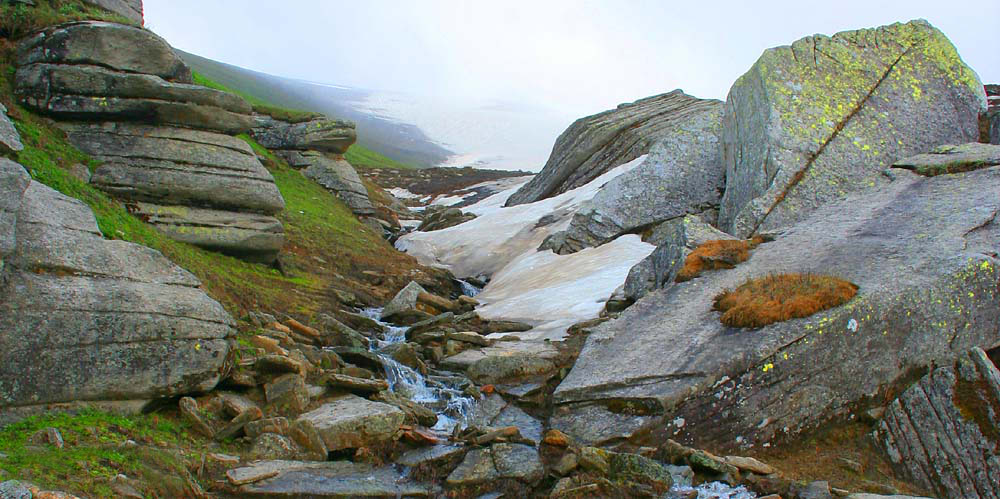
Stream on way to Daura Thatch

=== Longa Thatch ===
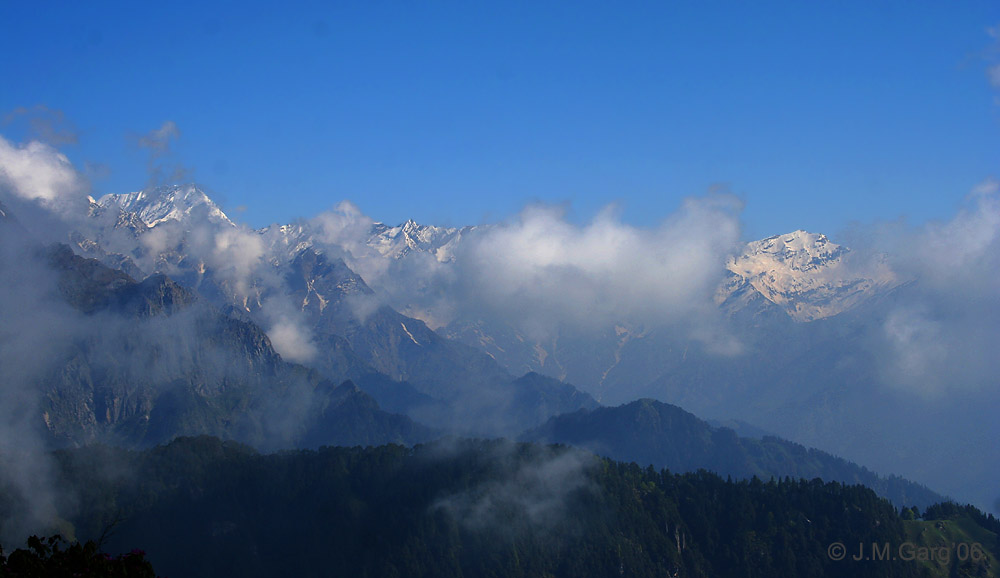
Ranges and the clouds- a view at Longa Thaatch Camp

Longa Thatch (10,800 feet) is reached after a trek of 12 kilometres via Saurkundi Pass.

=== Lekhni ===
After trekking another 10 kilometres mainly down-hill, the last camp site is at Lekhni (8,100 feet). It is situated alongside an apple orchard.

The final trek is downhill from Lekhni to Aalloo ground along the Manali-Kullu highway and from there by bus back to Babeli. Here, the group breaks up after morning breakfast.
