= List of settlements in Messenia =

This is a list of settlements in Messenia, Greece.

- Achladochori
- Adriani
- Aetos
- Agaliani
- Agios Floros
- Agios Nikolaos
- Agios Nikon
- Agios Sostis
- Agrilia
- Agrilia
- Agrilos
- Agrilovouno
- Aithaia
- Akritochori
- Alagonia
- Alonia
- Altomira
- Amfeia
- Amfithea
- Ammos
- Ampeliona
- Ampelofyto
- Ampelokipoi
- Analipsi
- Andania
- Androusa
- Anemomylos
- Ano Dorio
- Ano Melpeia
- Antheia
- Anthousa
- Antikalamos
- Archaia Messini
- Arfara
- Ariochori
- Aris
- Aristodimio
- Aristomenis
- Armenioi
- Arsinoi
- Artemisia
- Artiki
- Asprochoma
- Aspropoulia
- Avia
- Avlonas
- Avramiou
- Chalazoni
- Chalkias
- Chandrinos
- Charakopio
- Charavgi
- Chatzis
- Chomatada
- Chora
- Chranoi
- Christianoupoli
- Chrysochori
- Chrysokellaria
- Daras
- Dasochori
- Desyllas
- Diavolitsi
- Diodia
- Doloi
- Dorio
- Draina
- Drosia
- Elaia
- Elaiochori
- Ellinoekklisia
- Eva
- Evangelismos
- Exochiko
- Exochori
- Falanthi
- Faraklada
- Filia
- Filiatra
- Flesias
- Floka
- Foiniki
- Foinikounta
- Gargalianoi
- Glyfada
- Glykorrizi
- Iklaina
- Ilektra
- Kainourgio Chorio
- Kakaletri
- Kalamaras
- Kalamata
- Kalitsaina
- Kallirroi
- Kallithea
- Kalo Nero
- Kalochori
- Kalogeresi
- Kalogerorrachi
- Kalyvia
- Kamari
- Kampos
- Kaplani
- Kardamyli
- Karnasi
- Karpofora
- Karteroli
- Karveli
- Karyes
- Karyovouni
- Kastania, Messini
- Kastania, West Mani
- Kato Melpeia
- Katsaros
- Kefalinos
- Kefalovrysi
- Kefalovryso
- Kentriko
- Kentro
- Klima
- Kokkino
- Koklas
- Kompoi
- Konstantinoi
- Kopanaki
- Koromilea
- Koroni
- Koryfasi
- Koukkounara
- Kourtaki
- Koutifaris
- Kouvelas
- Kremmydia
- Kryoneri
- Kynigos
- Kyparissia
- Lachanada
- Ladas
- Lagkada
- Laiika
- Lampaina
- Lantzounato
- Lefki
- Lefkochora
- Longa
- Loutro
- Lykissa
- Lykotrafos
- Lykoudesi
- Madena
- Magoula
- Mali
- Malta
- Malthi
- Mandra
- Manesis
- Manganiako
- Maniaki
- Mantzari
- Marathopoli
- Margeli
- Mathia
- Mavrommati
- Meligalas
- Meropi
- Mesochori
- Mesopotamos
- Messini
- Metamorfosi
- Metaxada
- Methoni
- Mikri Mantineia
- Mikromani
- Mila
- Milea
- Miliotio
- Militsa
- Monastiri
- Mouriatada
- Mouzaki
- Myro
- Myrsinochorio
- Nea Koroni
- Neda
- Nedousa
- Neochori Aristomenous
- Neochori Ithomis
- Neochori, West Mani
- Neromylos
- Nomitsis
- Oichalia
- Palaio Loutro
- Palaiokastro
- Paniperi
- Papaflessas
- Pappoulia
- Parapougki
- Pefko
- Pelekanada
- Perdikoneri
- Petalidi
- Petritsi
- Pidasos
- Pidima
- Pigadia
- Piges
- Pilalistra
- Piperitsa
- Platania
- Platanovrysi
- Plati
- Platsa
- Platy
- Poliani
- Polichni
- Polylofos
- Polythea
- Poulitsi
- Proastio
- Prodromos
- Prosilio
- Psari
- Pyla
- Pylos
- Pyrgos Kalamon
- Pyrgos Trifylias
- Raches
- Raptopoulo
- Revmatia
- Rigklia
- Rodia
- Romanos
- Saïdona
- Sellas
- Siamo
- Sidirokastro
- Sitochori
- Skala
- Skliros
- Solaki
- Sotirianika
- Soulinari
- Sperchogeia
- Spilia
- Spitali
- Stamatino
- Stasimo
- Stasio
- Stavropigi
- Stenyklaros
- Sterna
- Stoupa
- Strefi
- Syrrizo
- Thalames
- Thouria
- Trachila
- Trikorfo
- Triodos
- Tripyla
- Tseria
- Tsoukalaiika
- Valta
- Valyra
- Vanada
- Vasiliko
- Velanidia
- Velika
- Verga
- Vlachopoulo
- Vlasis
- Vounaria
- Voutaina
- Vromovrisi
- Vryses
- Yameia
- Zermpisia
- Zevgolateio

== See also ==
- List of towns and villages in Greece
