= 1986 Kalamata earthquake =

Earthquake in Greece

- Location within Greece
- UTC time: 1986-09-13 17:24:31
- ISC event: 486403
- USGS-ANSS: ComCat
- Local date: 13 September 1986
- Local time: 20:24 EET
- Magnitude: 5.9 M_{w}
- Depth: 12.5 km (7.8 mi)
- Epicenter: 37.014°N 22.176°E
- Type: Normal
- Areas affected: Greece
- Max. intensity: MMI X (Extreme)
- Casualties: 20–22 dead, 330 injured

The 1986 Kalamata earthquake struck The Peloponnese of southern Greece on September 13 at 20:24 Eastern European Time (EET). The 12.5 km (7.8 mi) deep moment magnitude (M_{w}) 5.9 earthquake struck with an epicenter near Kalamata.

At least 20 people died and 330 were injured; a higher death toll was prevented because many residents of Kalamata attended a ferry line opening ceremony when the earthquake struck. In the city, six people died when an apartment building collapsed, and three died when the defensive towers of a monestary came down. Six others died from falling debris. More than 100 buildings were severely damaged or destroyed. In the nearby village of Elaiochori, four people died and 70 percent of its buildings were destroyed.

Members of the Greek Army, police, and fire service were involved in rescuing people trapped in buildings. Rescue teams from France and Germany also assisted. Survivors sought refuge at 30 campsites, and some moved to other areas like Athens. At Asprochoma, an emergency radio station was set up in a field and which would later become ERT Kalamata.

The earthquake resulted from normal faulting along a northwest-dipping fault called the Kalamata Fault. It initiated in a relay zone between the Kalamata and Thouria faults as a small event before transitioning onto the Kalamata Fault to the south. The shock produced a 15 km (9.3 mi) long surface rupture east of Kalamata with up to 18 cm (7.1 in) of vertical offset. Two strong ground motion sensors in Kalamata captured horizontal and vertical ground acceleration data with values exceeding 0.1 g.

== Tectonic setting ==
Greece is located in a complex zone of interaction between the African plate and the Aegean Sea. Along the Hellenic arc, the African plate subducts beneath the Aegean; shallow earthquakes occur northwest of Crete because of subduction-related deformation along a convergent boundary. Back-arc crustal extension of the Aegean northeast of Crete causes normal and strike-slip faulting earthquakes. Intermediate events more than 100 km (62 mi) beneath the Aegean also occur within the subducting African plate.

The Peloponnese region is characterized by active extensional tectonics which has continued since the Pliocene. Active east–west extension is accommodated by north–south striking normal faults.

East of Kalamata, the Taygetus range is bounded by north–south trending normal faults. The fault at the eastern boundary of the range, called the Kalamata Fault, was associated with the earthquake. The Kalamata Fault is part of a larger system of north-northwest–south-southeast trending, west-dipping en échelon normal faults that bound the range and Pamisos river plain. The continuation of this system north of the Kalamata Fault is the Thouria Fault; a 25 km (16 mi) west–northwest offset separates the Thouria Fault from the Kalamata Fault, known as a relay zone. South of the Kalamata Fault, the system is a complex oblique northwest–southeast trending graben near Kampos which likely extends offshore in the Messenian Gulf as a major fault west of Kardhamili. Believed to have formed during the Quaternary, it was not associated with any historic earthquakes or surface ruptures prior to the 1986 event. The region frequently experience earthquakes and their associated tsunamis and liquefaction such as in 1867 and 1947.

== Earthquake ==
The earthquake struck at 20:24 EET on 13 September with a moment magnitude of 5.9. Its epicenter was east of Kalamata, and the focus was at a depth of 12.5 km (7.8 mi). It was caused by normal faulting on a shallow, west-dipping plane; subsequent analysis of the aftershock distribution and seismic data determined that the fault dips approximately 45° to the west. The Kalamata Fault, ruptured over an area of about 15 by 10 km (9.3 by 6.2 mi). The mainshock began as a magnitude 4.5–5 subevent within the offset zone between the Thouria and Kalamata faults before transferring onto the Kalamata Fault. Most of the seismic energy was released by slip on the fault.

=== Surface rupture ===
The Kalamata Fault was interpreted as a listric normal fault where its dip angle is high at the surface and decreases at depth. At the surface, the fault plane's exposed slickensides on bedrock yielded much steeper dip angles of 60–70°. The surface exposure indicated predominantly normal-faulting displacements with a minor strike-slip movement.

Small fault scarps and surface ruptures were observed 2–3 km (1.2–1.9 mi) east of Kalamata and aligned with the location of a geologically young fault. These were reported for 15–18 km (9.3–11.2 mi) along a north-northeast–south-southwest trend, and were intermittently accompanied by a fissure. One of these ruptures was mapped continuously for 4.5 km (2.8 mi). Some ruptures measured up to 6–18 cm (2.4–7.1 in) in vertical height and were 2–6 cm (0.79–2.36 in) wide. They often appeared in terraced olive groves near rocky outcrops, and were several tens of centimeters west of a large fault surface. Heavy damage occurred in homes where the surface rupture propagated beneath.

The most significant surface rupture occurred within an existing north-northeast trending fault trace in the Mesozoic limestone at Elaiochori and Perivolakia. It exhibited a vertical displacement of 10 cm (3.9 in) on the northwest side of the fault, horizontal heave of 5–15 cm (2.0–5.9 in), and left-lateral offset of 3 cm (1.2 in). A 2 km (1.2 mi) rupture occurred along the beach at Paralia Verga, a village southeast of Kalamata, with the WNW side of the rupture displaced vertically by 6 cm (2.4 in) and horizontally by 1–10 cm (0.39–3.94 in). Some homes atop the rupture were badly damaged. Some 2.5 km (1.6 mi) southwest of Nedousa, the fault exhibited 10 cm (3.9 in) of vertical slip on the NW side.

=== Strong ground motion ===
Modified Mercalli intensities in selected locations
MMI	Locations
X (Extreme)	Elaiochori, Perivolakia
VII–VIII (Very strong–Severe)	Kalamata, Verga, Poliani, Aris, Artemisia, Nedousa
V–VI (Moderate–Strong)	Achladochori, Chelidoni, Ampheia, Kampos, Andritsaina-Krestena, Goumero, Makrisia

Two accelerographs in Kalamata recorded a maximum peak ground acceleration (pga) of 0.27 g in the horizontal component and 0.368 g in the vertical component. Ground motion in excess of 0.1 g lasted for 2.5 seconds while the maximum horizontal velocity was 32.3 cm (12.7 in) per second. In Elaiochori, 7 km (4.3 mi) from Kalamata, the highly amplified spectral accelerations for periods of 0.15 to 1.6 seconds were too extreme for buildings to withstand. Large acceleration were also reported for periods between 0.2 and 0.8 seconds, matching the natural periods of existing buildings.

The greater Kalamata and Elaiochori regions were within the meizoseismal area. Downtown Kalamata was assigned Modified Mercalli intensity VIII (Severe) while in the destroyed villages of Elaiochori and Perivolakia, the intensity was X (Extreme). Damage within Kalamata was significantly non-uniform, being heavier in the northern and eastern parts. This was attributed to coseismic rupture characteristics and variations in the local sediment thickness.

=== Aftershocks ===
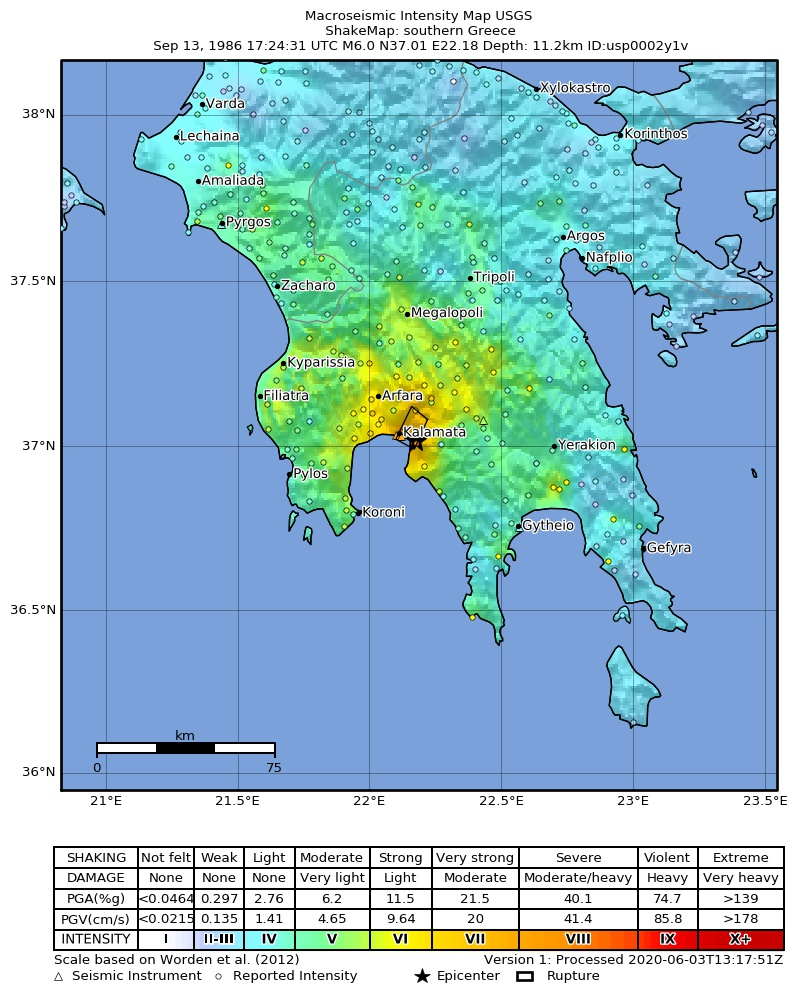
A strong ground motion map illustrating seismic intensity

Many of the roughly 740 aftershocks recorded in the first two week were caused by normal faulting. They were distributed across a 15 km (9.3 mi) × 10 km (6.2 mi) in north and south clusters with focal depths up to 10 km (6.2 mi) deep, though none occurred beyond 12 km (7.5 mi). The southern cluster is likely linked with the Kalamata Fault and corresponded with the surface rupturing segment. These normal fault shocks exhibited dip angles of 55–60°, steeper than the angle implied from the overall aftershock distribution and of the Kalamata Fault. This discrepancy that may reflect the simplified seismic velocity structure adopted to compute the focal mechanisms, but if the variations are true, could suggest the Kalamata Fault steepen near the surface. Additionally, some aftershocks within the footwall block exhibited thrust faulting.

The northern cluster is more spatially compact and inside the relay zone between the Kalamata and Thouria faults. No surface ruptures were associated with this cluster. Some aftershocks in this cluster were dextral strike-slip events on east-west trending planes perpendidular to the Kalamata Fault. A gap with relatively low aftershock activity separating the north and south clusters occurred in this zone, measuring 2 km (1.2 mi) wide and extending 8 km (5.0 mi) deep. Seismic activity from both clusters merge at depths of 9 to 10 km (5.6 to 6.2 mi). This gap may be an unruptured seismic barrier on the Kalamata Fault. Another explanation is that the mainshock actually initiated within the gap, with a precedent being the 1983 Borah Peak earthquake where no aftershocks occurred immediately around the epicenter.

The largest aftershock struck on 15 September, measuring M_{s} 5.3 with an epicenter south of the mainshock. It had a maximum intensity of VII (Very strong), caused 37 injuries, and further damage in Kalamata.

== Impact ==
At least 20 or 22 people died; more deaths were prevented because most residents attended a ferry line opening ceremony when it occurred. Six bodies were recovered from a five-story reinforced concrete apartment that collapsed. Another six others died when debris fell onto the streets. One death was related to heart attack and an infant died of suffocation. Three individuals perished when the Holy Monastery of Velanidia's defensive towers collapsed. Four people died when an old stone building collapsed in Elaiochori. An additional 330 people were injured, including 83 with serious injuries.

The earthquake caused €670 million in damage. (Note: Monetary value in 1986) The damage in Kalamata was concentrated in its city's historic central and northeast corners. There, most buildings were constructed with masonry and were about 150 to 200 years old. According to Ta Nea, at least 112 buildings were partially or completely destroyed while about 70 percent of the city's buildings had severe cracks. Twenty percent of the city's buildings, including 44 reinforced concrete structures, were demolished due to the extent of damage. At a jetty, cracks up to 10 cm (3.9 in) wide were reported and parts of its walls partially detached. Communication services were disrupted and power outages occurred across the city. At Elaiochori, at least 70 percent of its buildings were destroyed, leaving only 120 intact. Heavy damage also occurred in the villages of Verga, Poliani, Aris, Artemisia and Nedousa. Other structures such as bridges and industrial facilities sustained little damage or were unaffected. Some rockfalls occurred in the Taygetus mountains, obstructing a major road that linked Kalamata to Sparta.

== Aftermath ==
In Kalamata, recsuers immediately attended to a collapsed apartment and another two-storey house. Eleven people were rescued from the apartment. Members of the Greek Army, police and fire service also joined the rescue. These efforts were disrupted by onlookers, friends and family members of those trapped visiting the site. Rescue teams from France and Germany also assisted.

The earthquake led to the founding of Kalamata Radio Station, now known as ERT Kalamata, initiated by transport and communication minister, Stefanos Tzoumakas. The emergency radio station setup was in a field in Asprochoma on 17 September with three presenters. A backup radio transmitter from Hellenic Radio in Rhodes was used by the station.

The ferry at the service line inauguration ceremony was converted into a temporary refuge center before containers and tents were available. The displaced were housed in 30 accommodation centers. Some residents who had relatives elsewhere like Athens fled the city for an extended period. Reconstruction of the city continued for at least five years.

Prime Minister Andreas Papandreou did not attend a memorial ceremony on the one-year anniversary of the earthquake, citing his busy schedule. Instead, he boarded a cruise with Dimitra Liani which sparked anger among the public.

== See also ==
- List of earthquakes in 1986
- List of earthquakes in Greece
