= Glykorrizi =

Glykorrizi Γλυκορρίζι
- Community
- Location within Greece
- Coordinates: 37°18′18″N 21°46′19″E
- Country: Greece
- Administrative region: Peloponnese
- Regional unit: Messenia
- Municipality: Trifylia
- Municipal unit: Aetos

Population (2021)
  - Community: 74
- Time zone: UTC+2 (EET)
  - Summer (DST): UTC+3 (EEST)

Glykorrizi (Greek: Γλυκορρίζι, before 1927: Μουρτάτο - Mourtato) is a small village situated in the Peloponnese, southern Greece. It is located in the north-western part of Messenia, and is part of the municipal unit of Aetos. The population of the community has been estimated at 60 people but during the summer this number may more than double.

Glykorrizi is situated on a hillside, at 260 m elevation. It is surrounded by farmlands and small forests. It is 1 km west of Kamari, 4 km south of Sidirokastro, 5 km northwest of Kopanaki, the former seat of Aetos, 7 km east of Kalo Nero and 11 km northeast of Kyparissia.

== Population ==
Historical population
Year	Pop.	±%
1981	151	—
1991	119	−21.2%
2001	134	+12.6%
2011	83	−38.1%
2021	74	−10.8%

== History ==
The area in which the village is found has been continuously populated for at least the past 400 years, according to both Venetian and Byzantine records, but had never numbered more than a handful of families. The village experienced a steady increase in inhabitants prior to and after the Greek War of Independence.

Since the end of the Second World War and the Greek Civil War a significant portion of the local population resettled in Athens or immigrated to Australia, the United States and Canada.

== Today ==
The community currently has a church dedicated to the Virgin Mary and a smaller chapel of St. John which served as a krifo scholio ("secret school") during Ottoman rule. There are two churches and a small square. The former public school has been converted into a meeting place for its inhabitants. At the entrance of the village, the Avaros spring is situated.

== See also ==
- List of settlements in Messenia
