= Pamisos (river) =

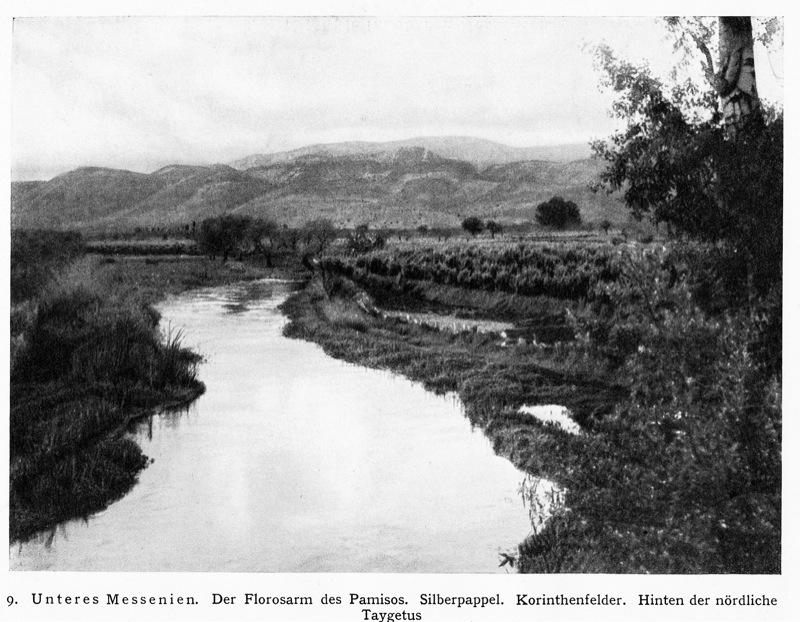
- Pamisos river in 1912
- Native name: Πάμισος (Greek)

Location
- Country: Greece

Physical characteristics
- Source
  - location: Taygetus mountains
- Mouth
  - location: Messenian Gulf
  - coordinates: 37°1′13″N 22°1′12″E
- Length: 44 km (27 mi)
- Basin size: 568 km^{2} (219 sq mi)

The Pamisos (Greek: Πάμισος, Latin: Pamisus) is the largest river of the Messenia regional unit of the southern Peloponnese in Greece. It is 44 km (27 mi) long, and its drainage area is 568 km^{2} (219 sq mi). Its source is on the western slopes of the Taygetus mountains, near the village Agios Floros. It runs through the municipal units of Arfara, Ithomi, Androusa, Aris, Messini, Thouria and Kalamata. It flows into the Messenian Gulf east of Messini and west of Kalamata.

== Etymology ==
There are two versions regarding the origin of its name. One theory suggests that the name "Pamisos" derives from the words "pan" (all) + "misos" (hate), due to the hostile relationship between the Spartans and the Messenians. However, as a compound word according to grammatical rules, it should be spelled as "Pammisos". Therefore, the most prevalent version is the second, which maintains that the name is of Pre-Greek and untranslatable origin—as also found in Thessaly—and was adopted by the Greek tribes that migrated south to Messenia, who performed rituals at its springs. According to this second version, the name has been recorded since antiquity by Strabo as well as Pausanias, who notes that Pamisos was worshipped as a deity.

== See also ==
- List of rivers in Greece
