= List of highways numbered 9A =

Route 9A can refer to the following highways:

== Greece ==
- EO9a road, a branch of the EO9 from Kalo Nero to the A7 motorway at Kalyvia, Messenia

== United States ==
- Connecticut Route 9A (former)
- Delaware Route 9A
- Florida State Road 9A (Jacksonville)
  - Florida State Road 9A (Miami)
- Maine State Route 9A
- Massachusetts Route 9A (former)
- Missouri Route 9A (former)
- New Hampshire Route 9A
- New York State Route 9A
- Oklahoma State Highway 9A
- Vermont Route F-9A
