= Marathopoli =

Marathopoli Μαραθόπολη
- Community
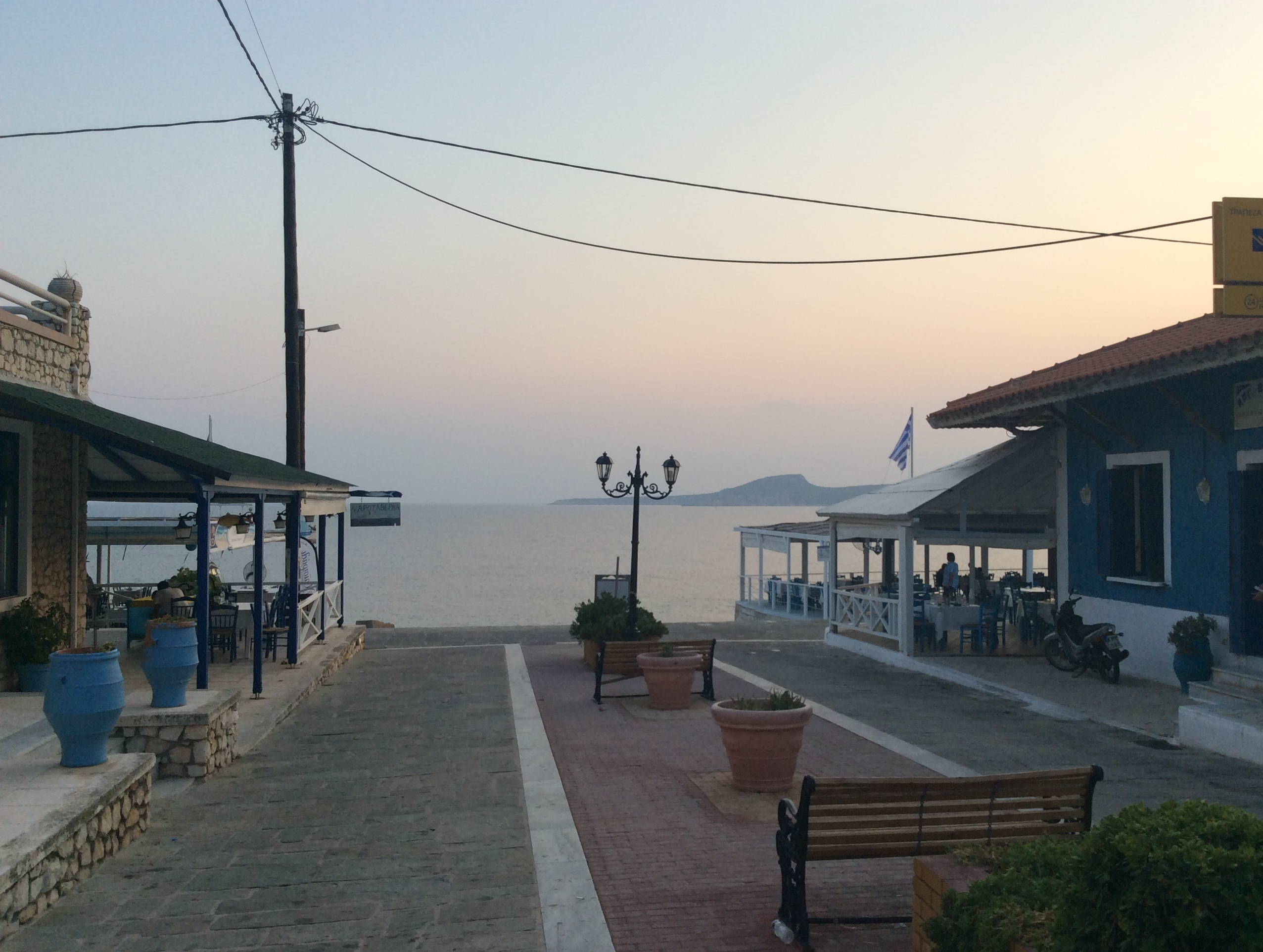
- Pedestrian zone in the center of Marathopoli in 2017

- Location within Greece
- Coordinates: 37°03′29″N 21°34′41″E
- Country: Greece
- Administrative region: Peloponnese
- Regional unit: Messenia
- Municipality: Trifylia
- Municipal unit: Gargalianoi
- Elevation: 0 m (0 ft)

Population (2021)
  - Community: 596
- Time zone: UTC+2 (EET)
  - Summer (DST): UTC+3 (EEST)
- Postal code: 244 00
- Area code: 27630
- Vehicle registration: ΚΜ

Marathopoli (Greek: Μαραθόπολη) is a village in the municipality Trifylia, Peloponnese, Greece.

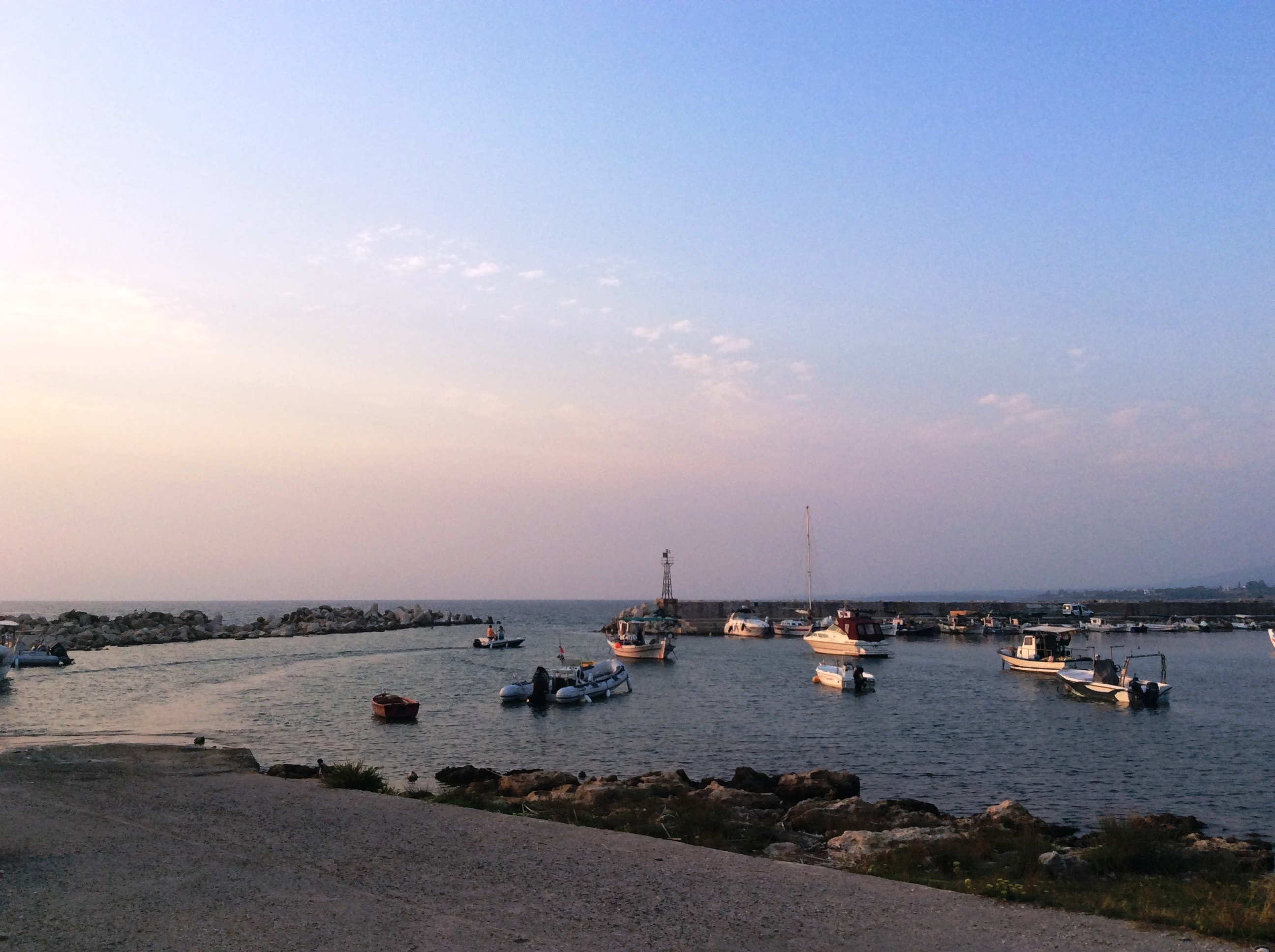
The port of Marathopoli

== Geography ==
Marathopoli is located inside of the municipal unit of Gargalianoi. To the west is Proti Island which can be accessed with small boats. The journey there usually takes 5 minutes. To the east is Gargalianoi which is 5.5 kilometers away and the EO9. To the north is Filiatra which is 11 kilometers away. South of the community are Romanos ≈10km, Gialova ≈15km, Navarino Bay and Pylos ≈23km.

== See also ==
- List of settlements in Messenia
- Gargalianoi
