= Loutro =

Loutro (Greek: Λουτρό) may refer to several places in Greece:

- Loutro (island), a rocky islet near the southwestern coast of Crete
- Loutro, Aetolia-Acarnania, a village in Aetolia-Acarnania
- Loutro, Chania, a village in the Chania regional unit of Crete
- Loutro, Karditsa, a village in the municipality Sofades, Karditsa regional unit
- Loutro, Elassona, a village in the municipality Elassona, Larissa regional unit
- Loutro, Larissa, a village in the municipality Larissa, Larissa regional unit
- Loutro, Messenia, a village in Messenia
- Kato Loutro, a village in the municipality Xylokastro-Evrostina, Corinthia
- Palaio Loutro, a village in Messenia

== See also ==
- Loutros (disambiguation)
