= Platania (disambiguation) =

Platania is a comune and town in Catanzaro, Calabria, Italy.

Platania may also refer to:

== People ==
- Giacinto Platania (c. 1612-1691), Italian painter
- John Platania (born 1948), American session musician, guitar player and record producer
- Marco Platania (born 1973), Italian rugby union player
- Pietro Platania (1828–1907), Italian composer and music teacher

== Places ==
- Platania, Kozani, a village and community in Voio, Greece
- Platania, Messenia, a village in the Peloponnese, Messenia, Greece
