= Sosti =

Sosti can refer to the following places:

- in Greece:
  - Sosti, Elis, a village in Elis
  - Sostis, a village and a municipal unit in the Rhodope regional unit
  - Agios Sostis, a village in Messenia
  - Agios Sostis, Phthiotis, a village in the municipal unit Spercheiada, Phthiotis
  - Agios Sostis, a cape in Preveza (regional unit)
- San Sosti, a commune in the province of Cosenza, Italy
