= Pyrgos, Gargalianoi =

Pyrgos Trifylias Πύργος Τριφυλίας
- Community
- Location within Greece
- Coordinates: 37°4.4′N 21°41.5′E
- Country: Greece
- Administrative region: Peloponnese
- Regional unit: Messenia
- Municipality: Trifylia
- Municipal unit: Gargalianoi
- Elevation: 594 m (1,949 ft)

Population (2021)
  - Community: 669
- Time zone: UTC+2 (EET)
  - Summer (DST): UTC+3 (EEST)
- Postal code: 244 00
- Area code: 27630
- Vehicle registration: ΚΜ

Pyrgos (Greek: Πύργος, also Πύργος Τριφυλίας - Pyrgos Trifylias) is a village in the municipality Trifylia, Peloponnese, Greece. Between 1912 and 1997, when it joined Gargalianoi, it was an independent community.

The village has one elementary school and one kindergarten, 7 churches, a central square with many cafe and bars, post office, and a super market. The sporting facility is to the west, named "Miltiadis Stadium".

The village is surrounded with hills covered with olive trees and grapevines.

== Historical population ==
Year	Population
1845	503
1970	650
2011	768
2021	669

== See also ==
- List of settlements in Messenia
