= Proti Island =

Island in Greece

Proti
Native name: Πρώτη
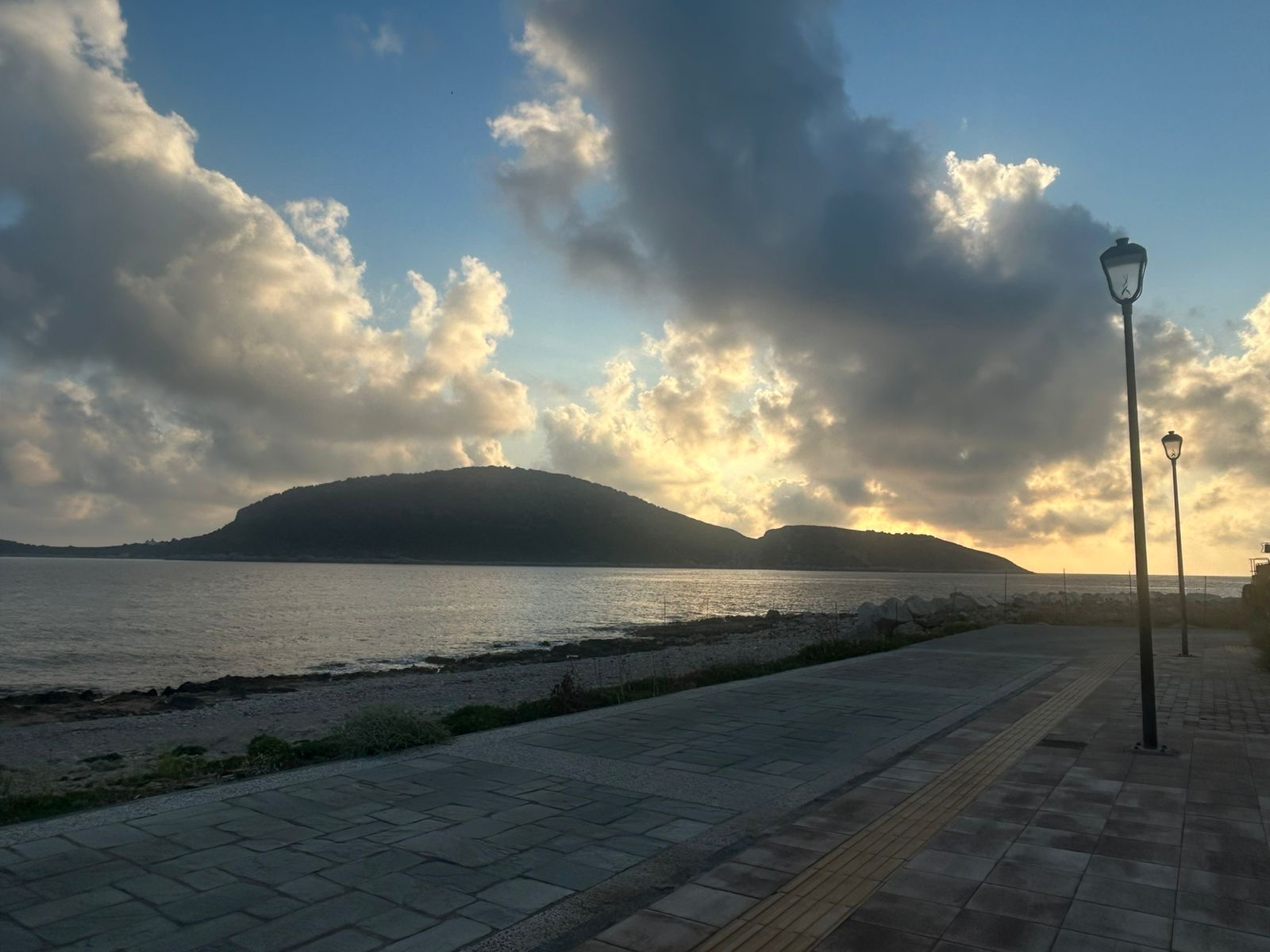
- Proti seen from Marathopoli
- Interactive map of Proti

Geography
- Coordinates: 37°03′N 21°33′E
- Total islands: 1
- Area: 3.107 km^{2} (1.200 sq mi)
- Highest point: 184 m

Administration
- Greece
- Region: Peloponnese
- Regional unit: Messenia
- Municipality: Gargalianoi
- Capital city: No capital

Demographics
- Population: 0 (2021)
- Pop. density: 0/km^{2} (0/sq mi)

Additional information
- Postal code: 244 00
- Area code: 27630
- Vehicle registration: KM

Proti Island of Messenia (Πρώτη Μεσσηνίας) is an island in the Ionian Sea, on the west coast of the Peloponnese; it is counted as one of the Ionian Islands, though administratively, it is part of the municipality of Gargalianoi, in the regional unit of Messenia. The 2001 census reported a population of four inhabitants.

== Geography ==
Proti is located in the southern Ionian Sea. The island is separated from the land by the Protis Strait (Strait of Katoulias). The depth of this strait can reach up to 35 meters. Marathopoli is parallel to the island being 5 minutes away, roughly 1.5km.

== Demographics ==
Historical population
Year	Pop.	±%
2001	4	—
2011	0	−100.0%
2021	0	0.00%

Up until 2001, there were inhabitants on the island. These inhabitants could have been fishermen or others in the Gorgopege Assumption Monastery.

== Description ==
The name of the island derives from the ancient sea god Proteus, son of Poseidon. The island was mentioned by ancient writers. The first reference of the island was in the history of Thukydides who refers that in 426 B.C. the Athenian fleet sailed around this island. Proti has archaeological interest, since on the island, there is a Mycenaean acropolis.

== Sights ==
Proti includes a beach (Vourlia). It is located on the southern side of the island and it is a tourist attraction for diving and snorkeling. There is also a monastery in the center of the island.(Gorgopege Assumption Monastery) Off the coast of the island, there are some WW2 shipwrecks, one of which is a Greek merchant ship. This ship was mistaken for a warship by the Italian Regia Marina and was torched in 1940. The other is a wooden shipwreck from the same era.

== Gallery ==
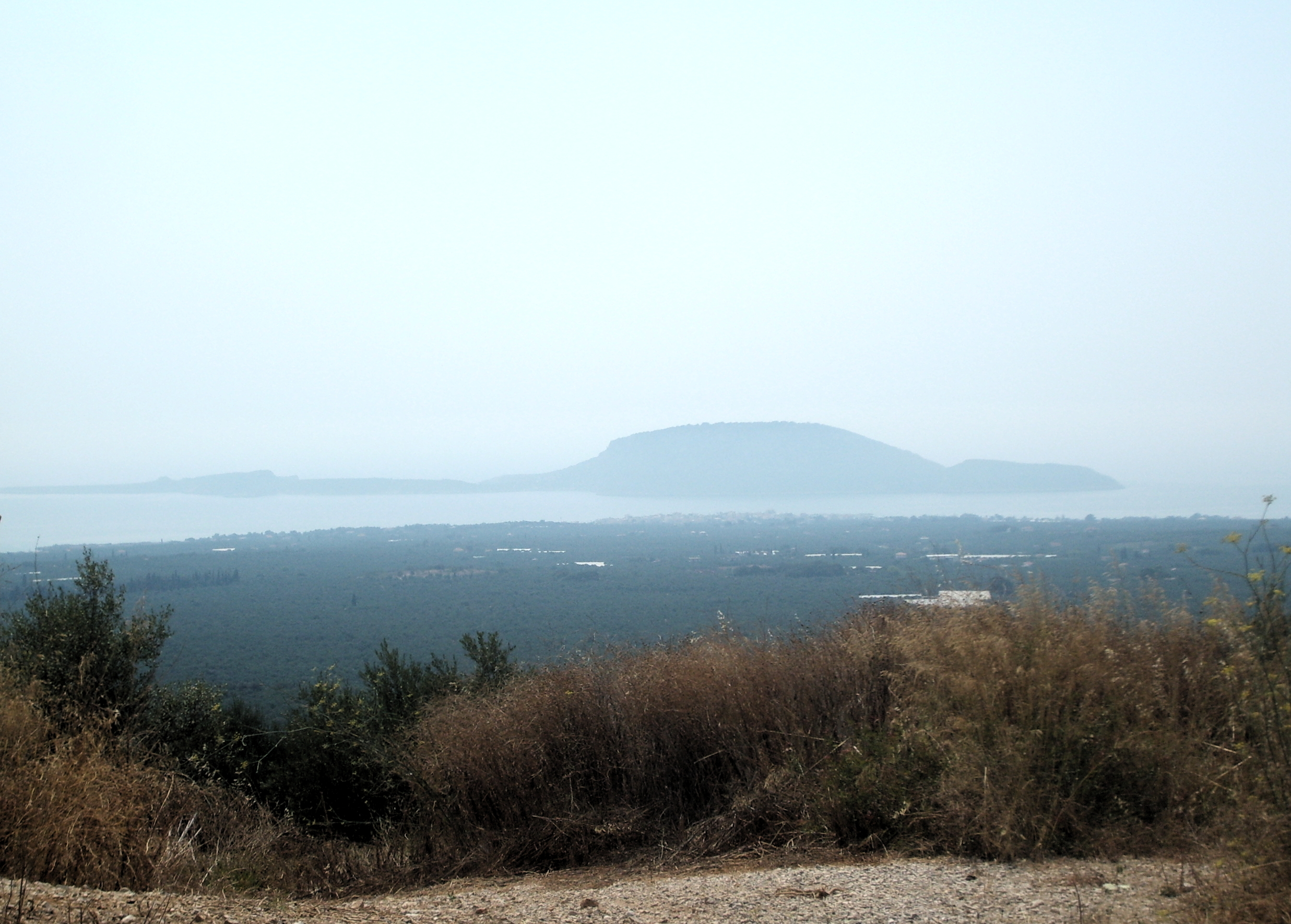
Proti from the opposite coast on a foggy day

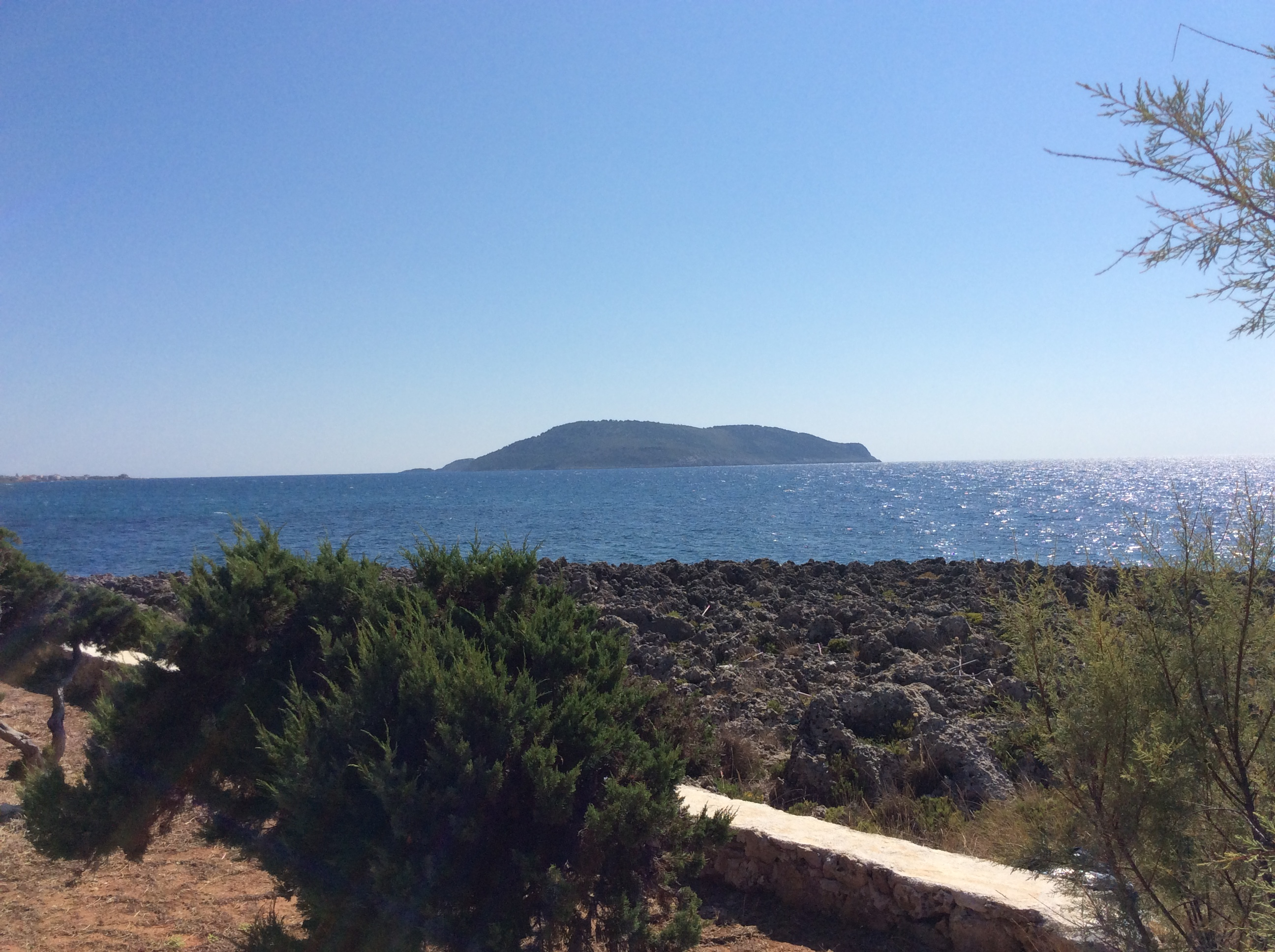
Proti viewed from the north in Lagouvardos

== See also ==
- Peleponnese (region)
- Messenia
- Gargalianoi
