= Koromilea, Messenia =

Koromilea Κορομηλέα
- Community
- Location within Greece
- Coordinates: 37°09′22″N 21°50′56″E
- Country: Greece
- Administrative region: Peloponnese
- Regional unit: Messenia
- Municipality: Messini
- Municipal unit: Trikorfo

Population (2021)
  - Community: 35
- Time zone: UTC+2 (EET)
  - Summer (DST): UTC+3 (EEST)

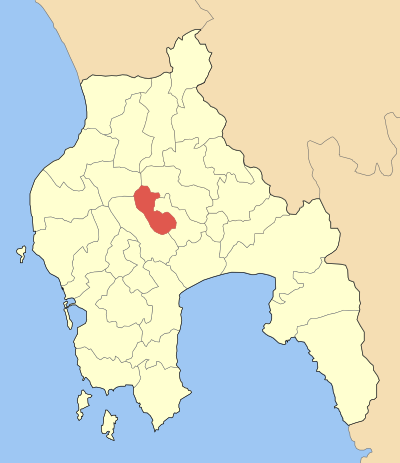
Locator map of Trikorfou Community (Κοινότητα Τρικόρφου) at Messinia perfecture, Greece

Koromilea (Greek: Κορομηλέα or Κορομηλιά, before 1927: Ζαγάρενα - Zagarena) is a village located in the central, mountainous area of Messenia, Greece. It is a settlement of 35 inhabitants (2021 census), administratively belonging to the municipal unit Trikorfo. The main occupation of the inhabitants, historically, is livestock and mixed farming.

Koromilea is well known in the area for the feasting which takes place every 14 and 15 of August in honour of the religious event of the Dormition. The dominant family names in Koromilea are Tserpes, Krompas, Konstantakopoulos (Greek: Τσερπές, Κρόμπας, Κωνσταντακόπουλος).
