= Mathia =

Mathia (Greek: Μαθία or Μαθιά) may refer to several villages in Greece:

- Mathia, Heraklion, a village in the Heraklion regional unit
- Mathia, Messenia, a village in Messenia

Mathia may also refer to food or cooking ingredients:

- Mathia, a flour, similar to peasemeal, made of peas and lentils
- Mathri, an Indian snack
- Mathia (film), a 2004 Indian film

Mathia may also refer to:

- MATHia, educational software developed by Carnegie Learning
