= Tragana =

Town in Messenia, Greece

Coordinates: 37.007°N 21.668°E

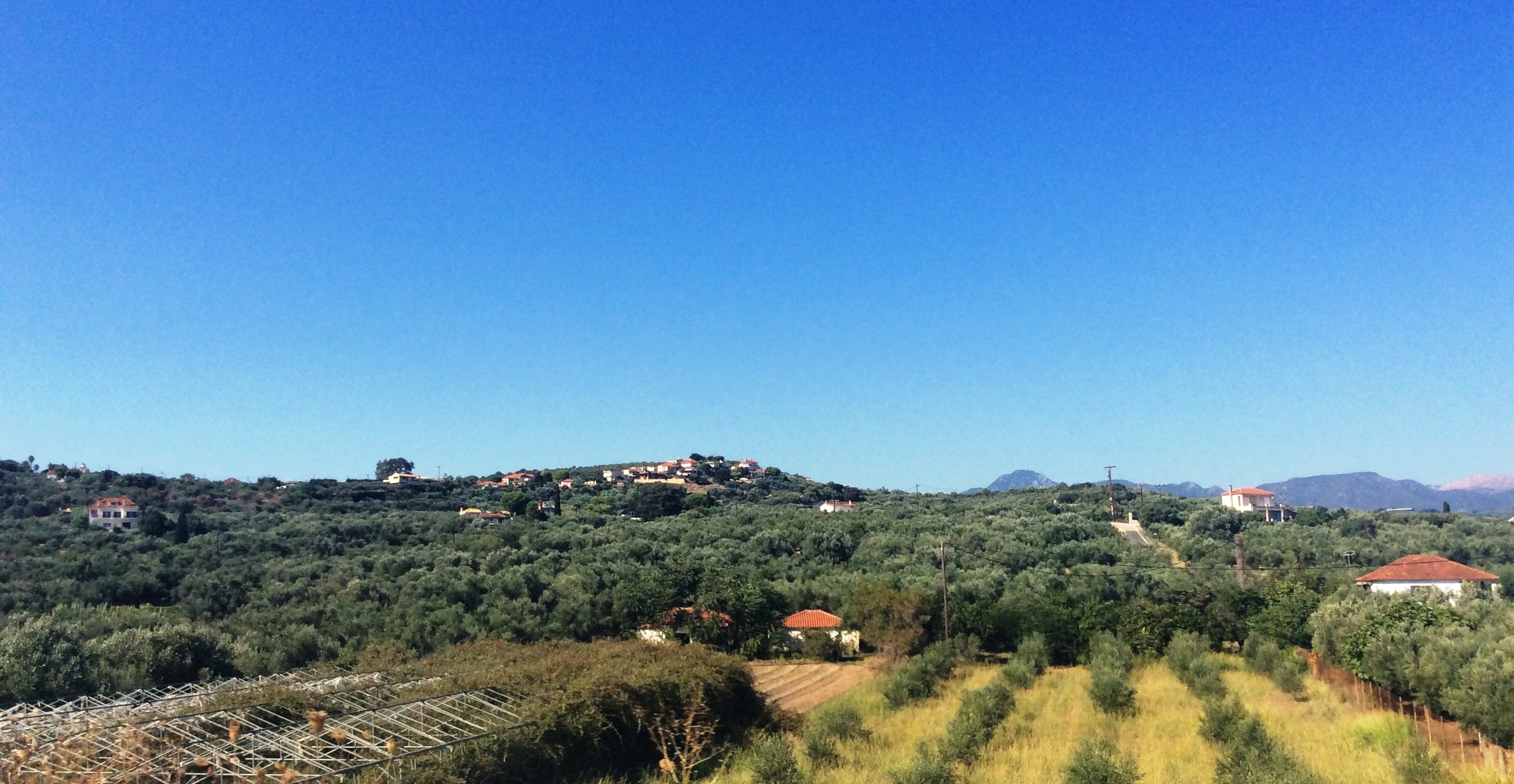
General view of the village from the southwest

Tragana is a town in the municipality of Trifylia, Messenia in Greece. It is located in the municipal unit of Gargalianoi. An early Bronze age cremation was found there.
