= Greek National Road 9a =

Trunk road in Greece

National Road 9a
- Εθνική Οδός 9α
- Route of the EO9a road, in blue

Route information
- Auxiliary route of EO9
- Part of E55
- Length: 31.2 km (19.4 mi)
- Existed: 24 July 1995–present

Major junctions
- East end: Tsakona
- West end: Kalo Nero

Location
- Country: Greece
- Regions: Peloponnese
- Primary destinations: Tsakona; Kalo Nero

Highway system
- Highways in Greece; Motorways; National roads
← EO9	→ EO10

Greek National Road 9a (Greek: Εθνική Οδός 9α), abbreviated as the EO9a, is a national road in the Peloponnese region of Greece. Created in 1995, the EO9a carries the European route E55 between Tsakona and Kalo Nero.

== Route ==
The EO9a is officially defined as an east–west road in the Messenia regional unit, running between Tsakona and the A7 motorway to the east, to Kalo Nero and the EO9 to the west: the road also connects with the EO7 at Tsakona. The entirety of the EO9a is part of European route E55.

== History ==
Ministerial Decision DMEO/e/oik/779 of 24 July 1995 created the EO9a, and classified it as part of the secondary national road network. It is unclear when the EO9a number came into use, but the number is presently in regular use.
