= Artemisia, Messenia =

Artemisia Αρτεμισία
- Community
- Location within Greece
- Coordinates: 37°6′N 22°14′E
- Country: Greece
- Administrative region: Peloponnese
- Regional unit: Messenia
- Municipality: Kalamata
- Municipal unit: Kalamata

Population (2021)
  - Community: 88
- Time zone: UTC+2 (EET)
  - Summer (DST): UTC+3 (EEST)
- Vehicle registration: KM

Artemisia (Greek: Αρτεμισία, before 1927: Τσερνίτσα - Tsernitsa) is a mountain village and a community in the municipality of Kalamata, Messenia, Greece. The community includes the small village Agios Ioannis Theologos. It is situated at 860 m above sea level. Many of its residents live there only during the summer months.

It is located in the west part of the Taygetos mountains on the EO82 road (Sparta–Kalamata–Pylos) between Kalamata and Sparta. It is 1.5 km southwest of Alagonia and 13 km northeast of Kalamata.

== Population ==
Year	Village population	Community population
1981	240	-
1991	327	339
2001	291	310
2011	136	142
2021	88	88

== History ==
Until 1927, the village was named Tsernitsa. From 1835 until 1912, it was part of the municipality of Alagonia. In 1912 it became an independent community, which joined the municipality of Kalamata in 1997.

== See also ==
- List of settlements in Messenia
