= Antikalamos =

Antikalamos Αντικάλαμος
- Community
- Location within Greece
- Coordinates: 37°4.1′N 22°3.8′E
- Country: Greece
- Administrative region: Peloponnese
- Regional unit: Messenia
- Municipality: Kalamata
- Municipal unit: Kalamata

Population (2021)
  - Community: 390
- Time zone: UTC+2 (EET)
  - Summer (DST): UTC+3 (EEST)
- Vehicle registration: KM

Antikalamos (Greek: Αντικάλαμος) is a village in the municipality of Kalamata, Messenia, Peloponnese, southern Greece. It is located 2 km southeast of Thouria and 6 km northwest of Kalamata city centre.

== Population ==
| Year | Population |
|---|---|
| 1981 | 281 |
| 1991 | 345 |
| 2001 | 541 |
| 2011 | 361 |
| 2021 | 390 |

== See also ==
- List of settlements in Messenia
