= Gargalianoi =

Town in Messenia, Greece

Gargalianoi Γαργαλιάνοι
- Municipal unit
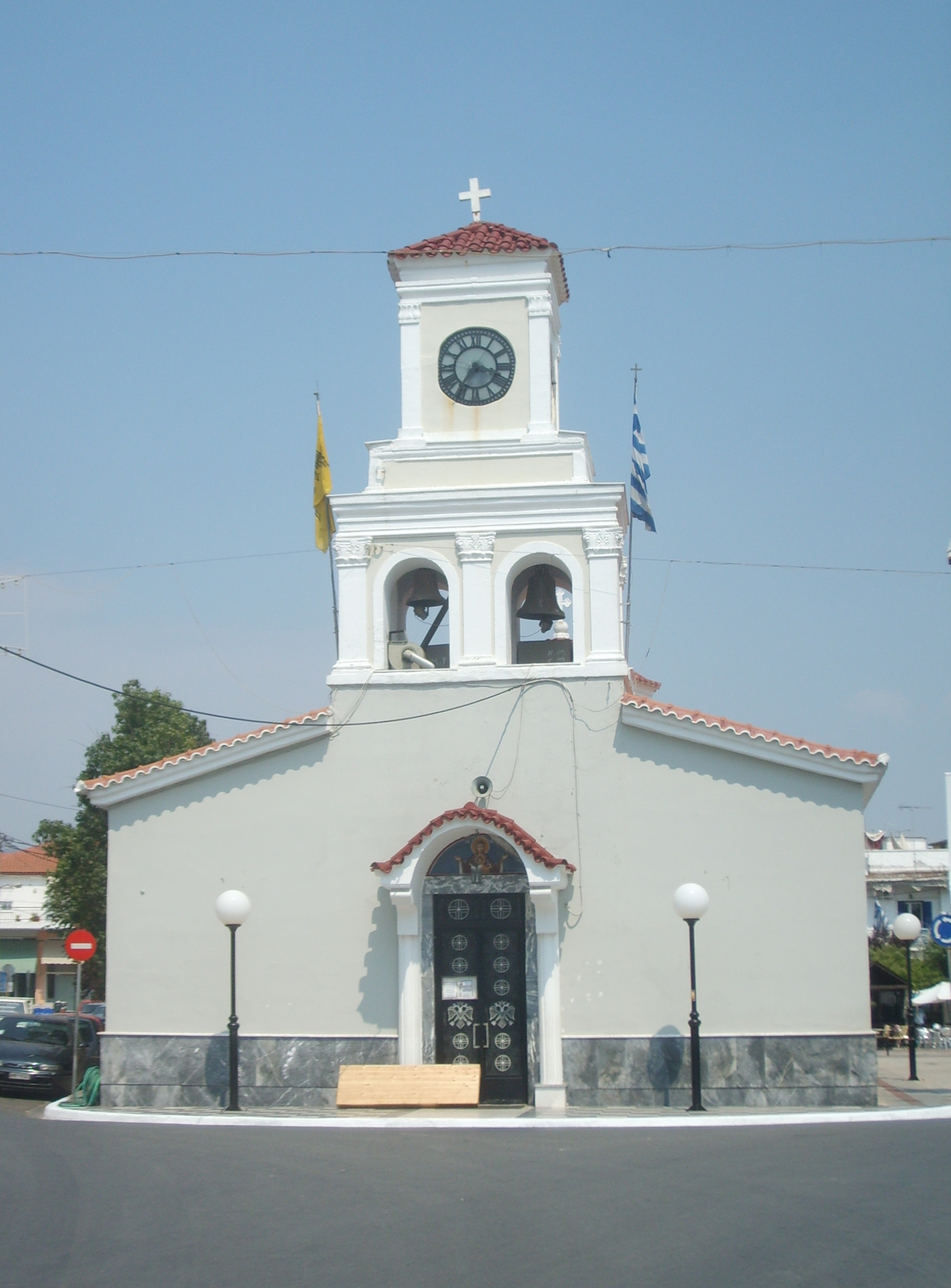
- Cathedral in Gargalianoi

- Location within the regional unit

- Location within Greece
- Coordinates: 37°4′N 21°38′E
- Country: Greece
- Administrative region: Peloponnese
- Regional unit: Messenia
- Municipality: Trifylia

Area
  - Municipal unit: 122.7 km^{2} (47.4 sq mi)
- Elevation: 294 m (965 ft)

Population (2021)
  - Municipal unit: 6,864
  - Municipal unit density: 55.94/km^{2} (144.9/sq mi)
  - Community: 4,724
- Time zone: UTC+2 (EET)
  - Summer (DST): UTC+3 (EEST)
- Postal code: 244 00
- Area code: 27630
- Vehicle registration: ΚΜ
- Website: gargaliani.gr

Gargalianoi (Greek: Γαργαλιάνοι) is a town and a former municipality in Messenia, Peloponnese, Greece. Since the 2011 local government reform it is part of the municipality Trifylia, of which it is a municipal unit. The municipal unit has an area of 122.680 km^{2}. It is situated 4 km (2.5 mi) from the Ionian Sea coast, 18 km (11 mi) north of Pylos, 21 km (13 mi) south of Kyparissia and 43 km (27 mi) west of Kalamata. The Greek National Road 9 (Patras - Pyrgos - Pylos) passes through the town.

== Subdivisions ==
The municipal unit Gargalianoi is subdivided into the following communities:

- Floka
- Gargalianoi
- Lefki (including Tragana)
- Marathopoli
- Mouzaki
- Pyrgos
- Valta

== Famous inhabitants ==
- Theophrastos Anagnostopoulos, who later anglicized his name to Theodore Agnew, father of United States Vice President Spiro Agnew
- Tellos Agras, Officer of the Hellenic Army during the Greek Struggle for Macedonia
- Theophilos III of Jerusalem, Patriarch of Jerusalem, born Ηλίας Γιαννόπουλος in Gargalianoi in 1952

== Historical population ==
Year	Town population	Municipality population
1981	5,430	-
1991	5,184	7,609
2001	5,970	9,083
2011	5,569	7,940
2021	4,724	6,864

== See also ==
- List of settlements in Messenia
