= Nea Koroni =

Nea Koroni Νέα Κορώνη
- Community
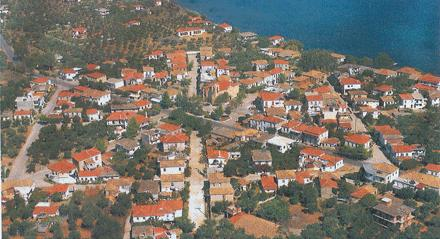

- Location within Greece
- Coordinates: 36°51′N 21°55′E
- Country: Greece
- Administrative region: Peloponnese
- Regional unit: Messenia
- Municipality: Messini
- Municipal unit: Aipeia

Population (2021)
  - Community: 234
- Time zone: UTC+2 (EET)
  - Summer (DST): UTC+3 (EEST)

Nea Koroni (Greek: Νέα Κορώνη) is a village in Messenia, part of the municipal unit of Aipeia. Its population is 234 (2021 census).

== History ==
Originally there was one village named Kastellia on the nearby hill of Goula (less than 1 km away of Nea Koroni). At this location in the ancient times existed the city of Kolonides. The Greek Pausanias (geographer) in his book "Messiniaka" reports that the people of Kolonides stated that they were not Messenians but Athenians brought from Attica by Kolainos(Greek:Κόλαινος). Kolainos is said that he followed a prophecy and was brought to the location where he founded Kolonides by following a korydon (bird).

Kastellia were named after the watch towers (Italian:Castello) the Venetians built at the top of the hill of Goula at 1200 AC. Kastellia played a part in the Greek War of Independence against the Ottoman Empire. An earthquake at the day of Friday 15 August 1886 struck the village and brought it to the ground. A matter of relocating the village occurred at that point.

The village was divided then and half of the people of Kastellia founded Nea Koroni at the location of Kadianika nearby the hill of Goula. Nea Koroni was built according to a unique design. The whole village, its roads and blocks, shape the United Kingdom's Union Flag.
