= Petalidi =

Petalidi Πεταλίδι
- Municipal unit
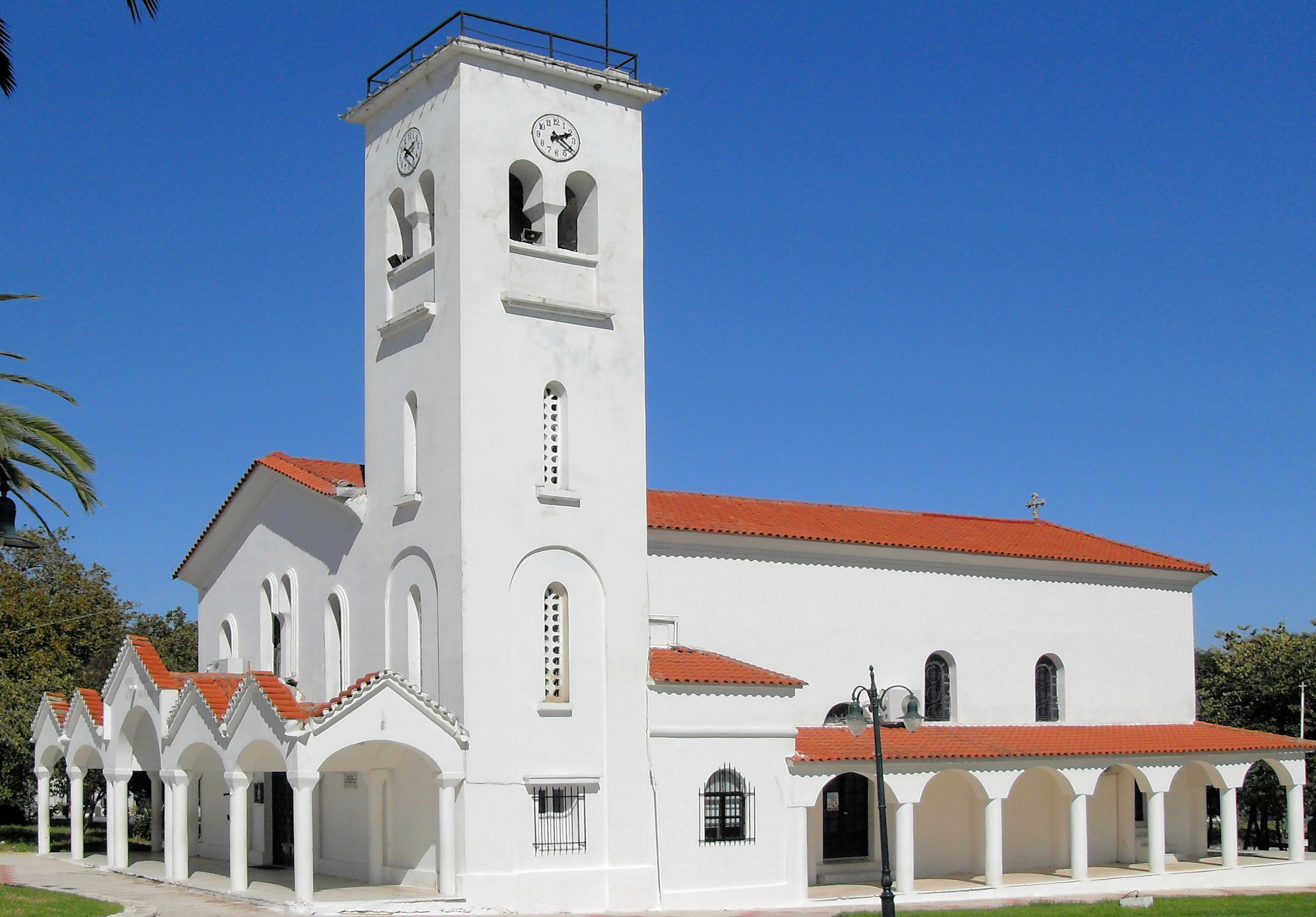
- Church of Agios Nikolaos, situated in the Central Square of the village

- Location within the regional unit

- Location within Greece
- Coordinates: 36°57′N 21°56′E
- Country: Greece
- Administrative region: Peloponnese
- Regional unit: Messenia
- Municipality: Messini

Area
  - Municipal unit: 104.97 km^{2} (40.53 sq mi)
- Elevation: 21 m (69 ft)

Population (2021)
  - Municipal unit: 2,555
  - Municipal unit density: 24.34/km^{2} (63.04/sq mi)
  - Community: 1,203
- Time zone: UTC+2 (EET)
  - Summer (DST): UTC+3 (EEST)
- Postal code: 240 05
- Area code: 27220
- Vehicle registration: ΚΜ

Petalidi (Greek: Πεταλίδι) is a village and a former municipality in Messenia, Peloponnese, Greece. Since the 2011 local government reform it is part of the municipality Messini, of which it is a municipal unit. The municipal unit has an area of 104.970 km^{2}. Petalidi is situated on the western shore of the Messenian Gulf, 14 km southwest of Messini, 20 km southwest of Kalamata and 25 km east of Pylos. The road Greek National Road 82 (Pylos – Kalamata) passes through the north of the municipal unit. Its population is 1,203 inhabitants, while the municipal unit has 2,555 residents (2021).

Petalidi is a touristic place in Messinia, visited mostly in summer months. Landmarks of the village are: The central square with the Church of Agios Nikolaos, the seafront, the lighthouse, the park on the port, the fount of Liar (η βρύση του ψεύτη in Greek) and the football field beside the sea.

== Subdivisions ==
The municipal unit Petalidi is subdivided into the following communities (2021 population in brackets):

- Achladochori (pop: 240)
- Daras (pop: 224)
- Drosia (pop: 79)
- Kalochori (pop: 98)
- Karpofora (pop: 139)
- Kastania (pop: 20)
- Kokkino (pop: 56)
- Lykissa (pop: 50)
- Mathia (pop: 52)
- Neromylos (pop: 231)
- Paniperi (pop: 163)
- Petalidi (pop: 1,203)

== Historical population ==
Year	Town population	Municipality population
1981	1,247	-
1991	1,138	3,906
2001	1,191	3,601
2011	1,244	3,217
2021	1,203	2,555

== See also ==
- List of settlements in Messenia
