= Evangelismos, Messenia =

Evangelismos Ευαγγελισμός
- Community
- Location within Greece
- Coordinates: 36°50′N 21°46′E
- Country: Greece
- Administrative region: Peloponnese
- Regional unit: Messenia
- Municipality: Pylos-Nestor
- Municipal unit: Methoni

Population (2021)
  - Community: 327
- Time zone: UTC+2 (EET)
  - Summer (DST): UTC+3 (EEST)

Evangelismos (Greek: Ευαγγελισμός) is a town near the southern coast of Messenia, Greece. It is located 10 km (6.2 mi) southeast of Pylos and 5 km (3.1 mi) east of Methoni. The town is the main settlement in Evangelismos Community which itself is part of the Methoni municipal unit within the Pylos-Nestor municipality. Nearby villages include Dentroulia and Kamaria.

== Other settlements within Evangelismos Community ==
- Amoulaki
- Dentroulia
- Kamaria
- Kavouriano
- Palialona

== Historical population ==
Year	Village	Community
1991	-	408
2001	287	398
2011	259	408
2021	195	327

== See also ==
- List of settlements in Messenia
