= Loutros =

Loutros may refer to the following places:

- Loutros, Cyprus, a village in Cyprus
- Loutros, Evros, a village in the Evros regional unit, Greece
- Loutros, Imathia, a village in the municipality Alexandreia, Imathia, Greece

== See also ==
- Loutro (disambiguation)
