= Ladas, Messenia =

Ladas Λαδάς
- Community
- Location within Greece
- Coordinates: 37°5′N 22°13′E
- Country: Greece
- Administrative region: Peloponnese
- Regional unit: Messenia
- Municipality: Kalamata
- Municipal unit: Kalamata

Population (2021)
  - Community: 102
- Time zone: UTC+2 (EET)
  - Summer (DST): UTC+3 (EEST)
- Vehicle registration: KM

Ladas (Greek: Λαδάς) is a small village in Greece, part of the municipality Kalamata, Messenia. It is located on Taygetos, and is one of the six villages which make up Alagonia. As of 2021, the village had 102 residents. The village was named for an athlete, Ladas, who took first place in the discus in the Ancient Olympic Games.
