= Lykissa =

Lykissa Λύκισσα
- Community
- Location within Greece
- Coordinates: 36°54′47″N 21°52′12″E
- Country: Greece
- Administrative region: Peloponnese
- Regional unit: Messenia
- Municipality: Messini
- Municipal unit: Petalidi

Population (2021)
  - Community: 50
- Time zone: UTC+2 (EET)
  - Summer (DST): UTC+3 (EEST)

Lykissa is a small village on the mountain of Mount Lykodimo in Messenia, Greece. The settlement was founded during the Greek revolution by Ioannis Pantazopoulos. It is part of the municipal unit Petalidi, which is part of the municipality Messini.
