= Platania, Messenia =

Village in southern Greece

Platania Πλατάνια
- Community

- Location within Greece
- Coordinates: 37°22′59″N 21°49′26″E
- Country: Greece
- Administrative region: Peloponnese
- Regional unit: Messenia
- Municipality: Trifylia
- Municipal unit: Avlonas

Population (2021)
  - Community: 81
- Time zone: UTC+2 (EET)
  - Summer (DST): UTC+3 (EEST)
- Postal code: 240 21

Platania (Greek: Πλατάνια) is a village in southern Greece, situated in the administrative region of the Peloponnese and the regional unit of Messenia. Up to 2011 it was a municipal district of the municipality of Avlonas. Since the 2011 local government reform, it is part of the municipality of Trifylia. The population of the village is 81 people (2021).
