= Meropi =

Meropi Μερόπη
- Community
- Location within Greece
- Coordinates: 37°14.5′N 22°0.1′E
- Country: Greece
- Administrative region: Peloponnese
- Regional unit: Messenia
- Municipality: Oichalia
- Municipal unit: Oichalia
- Elevation: 80 m (260 ft)

Population (2021)
  - Community: 484
- Time zone: UTC+2 (EET)
  - Summer (DST): UTC+3 (EEST)
- Postal code: 24002
- Area code: 27240

Meropi (Greek: Μερόπη) is a village and a community in the municipality of Oichalia, in Messenia, Greece. It is located in the plains of northern Messenia, west of the Taygetus mountains. It is near a major highway linking Kalamata and Corinth, the Greek National Road 7. It is 1.5 km south of Oichalia, 3.5 km northeast of Meligalas, 21 km southwest of Megalopoli and 26 km north of Kalamata. In 2021 its population was 484 for the community, which consists of the villages Meropi, Allagi and Mousta.

The community has a small school, a church, a restaurant, a post office and a square. Farm lands surround the villages. Olive groves are common in the west and north.

== See also ==
- List of settlements in Messenia
