= Voufrades =

Voufrades Βουφράδες
- Municipal unit
- Location within the regional unit

- Location within Greece
- Coordinates: 37°00′N 21°49′E
- Country: Greece
- Administrative region: Peloponnese
- Regional unit: Messenia
- Municipality: Messini

Area
  - Municipal unit: 42.36 km^{2} (16.36 sq mi)

Population (2021)
  - Municipal unit: 853
  - Municipal unit density: 20.1/km^{2} (52.2/sq mi)
- Time zone: UTC+2 (EET)
  - Summer (DST): UTC+3 (EEST)
- Vehicle registration: ΚΜ

Voufrades (Greek: Βουφράδες) is a former municipality in Messenia, Peloponnese, Greece. Since the 2011 local government reform it is part of the municipality Messini, of which it is a municipal unit. The municipal unit has an area of 42.360 km^{2}. Population 853 (2021). The seat of the municipality was in Chatzis.
