= Vlassis =

Vlassis is both a given name and a surname. Notable people with the name include:

- Aristidis Vlassis (1947–2015), Greek painter
- Vlassis Bonatsos (1949–2004), Greek actor
- Vlassis Maras, Greek gymnast
- Vlassis G. Rassias (1959–2019), Greek writer, religious leader
- Kostas Vlasis, Deputy Minister of Greeks abroad at the Ministry of Foreign Affairs (Greece)

== See also ==
- Vlasis
