= Ilektra =

Ilektra is a feminine given name which may refer to:

- Ilektra Apostolou (1912–1944), Greek Resistance member
- Ilektra Lebl (born 1999), Greek swimmer
- Ilektra Psouni (born 1985), Greek water polo player

== See also ==
- Elektra (name), including a list of people and fictional characters with the given name Elektra or Electra
