= Elaiochori, Messenia =

Elaiochori Ελαιοχώρι
- Community
- Country: Greece
- Administrative region: Peloponnese
- Regional unit: Messenia
- Municipality: Kalamata
- Municipal unit: Kalamata
- Time zone: UTC+2 (EET)
  - Summer (DST): UTC+3 (EEST)

Elaiochori (Greek: Ελαιοχώρι) is a village in the municipality of Kalamata, Messenia, Peloponnese, southern Greece. It was once known as Gianitsa or Giannitsa.

== Population ==
| Year | Population |
|---|---|
| 1981 | |
| 1991 | 352 |
| 2001 | 385 |
| 2011 | 270 |
| 2021 | |

== See also ==
- List of settlements in Messenia
