= Aetos, Messenia =

Aetos Αετός
- Municipal unit
- Location within the regional unit

- Location within Greece
- Coordinates: 37°17′N 21°49′E
- Country: Greece
- Administrative region: Peloponnese
- Regional unit: Messenia
- Municipality: Trifylia

Area
  - Municipal unit: 94.85 km^{2} (36.62 sq mi)

Population (2021)
  - Municipal unit: 1,540
  - Municipal unit density: 16.2/km^{2} (42.1/sq mi)
  - Community: 249
- Time zone: UTC+2 (EET)
  - Summer (DST): UTC+3 (EEST)
- Vehicle registration: ΚΜ

Aetos (Greek: Αετός meaning "eagle") is a village and a former municipality in Messenia, Peloponnese, Greece. Since the 2011 local government reform it is part of the municipality Trifylia, of which it is a municipal unit. The municipal unit has an area of 94.850 km^{2}. In 2021 its population was 249 for the village and 1,540 for the municipal unit. The seat of the former municipality was in Kopanaki.

== Subdivisions ==
The municipal unit Aetos is subdivided into the following communities (constituent villages in brackets):

- Aetos
- Agrilia Trifylia (Nea Agrilia)
- Artiki
- Glykorrizi
- Kamari
- Kefalovrysi (Kefalovrysi, Tsertsaiika)
- Kryoneri
- Kopanaki (Kopanaki, Agios Dimitrios, Rizochori)
- Monastiri
- Polythea
- Sitochori
