= Papaflessas, Messenia =

Papaflessas Παπαφλέσσας
- Municipal unit
- Location within the regional unit

- Location within Greece
- Coordinates: 37°01′N 21°47′E
- Country: Greece
- Administrative region: Peloponnese
- Regional unit: Messenia
- Municipality: Pylos-Nestor

Area
  - Municipal unit: 42.1 km^{2} (16.3 sq mi)

Population (2021)
  - Municipal unit: 1,120
  - Municipal unit density: 26.6/km^{2} (68.9/sq mi)
  - Community: 39
- Time zone: UTC+2 (EET)
  - Summer (DST): UTC+3 (EEST)
- Vehicle registration: ΚΜ

Papaflessas (Greek: Παπαφλέσσας, before 1915: Κοντογόνι - Kontogoni) is a village and a former municipality in Messenia, Peloponnese, Greece. Since the 2011 local government reform it is part of the municipality Pylos-Nestor, of which it is a municipal unit. The municipal unit has an area of 42.137 km^{2}. Population 1,120 (2021). The seat of the municipality was in Vlachopoulo.

It comprises five communities (τοπική κοινότητα): Vlachopoulo, Metamorfosi, Maniaki, Papaflessas, and Margeli. It was named after the Greek priest and revolutionary Papaflessas.
