= Sidirokastro, Messenia =

Sidirokastro Σιδηρόκαστρο
- Community
- Location within Greece
- Coordinates: 37.338°N 21.771°E
- Country: Greece
- Administrative region: Peloponnese
- Regional unit: Messenia
- Municipality: Trifylia
- Municipal unit: Avlonas

Population (2021)
  - Community: 109
- Time zone: UTC+2 (EET)
  - Summer (DST): UTC+3 (EEST)
- Vehicle registration: ΚΜ

Sidirokastro (Greek: Σιδηρόκαστρο), officially referred to as Sidirokastron, is a semi-mountainous settlement near Avlonas and is administratively part of the Municipality of Trifylia, in Messinia, Greece. Sidirokastro was the seat of the former municipality of Avlonas, which existed between 1835 and 1912, and between 1997 and 2010.

== History ==
The oldest village of Sidirokastro was located inside and around the homonymous castle, Sidirokastro and was a large settlement, according to its ruins, which still exist today. The history of the old village is directly related to the history of this Castle and its area, which was under the control of the Principality of Achaia and then the Despotate of Mystras.

During the pre-revolutionary period, the Revolution of 1821 and the struggles that followed until the final liberation of the area, several groups of rebels acted in the area of Sidirokastro.
