= Avramiou =

Avramiou Αβραμιού
- Community
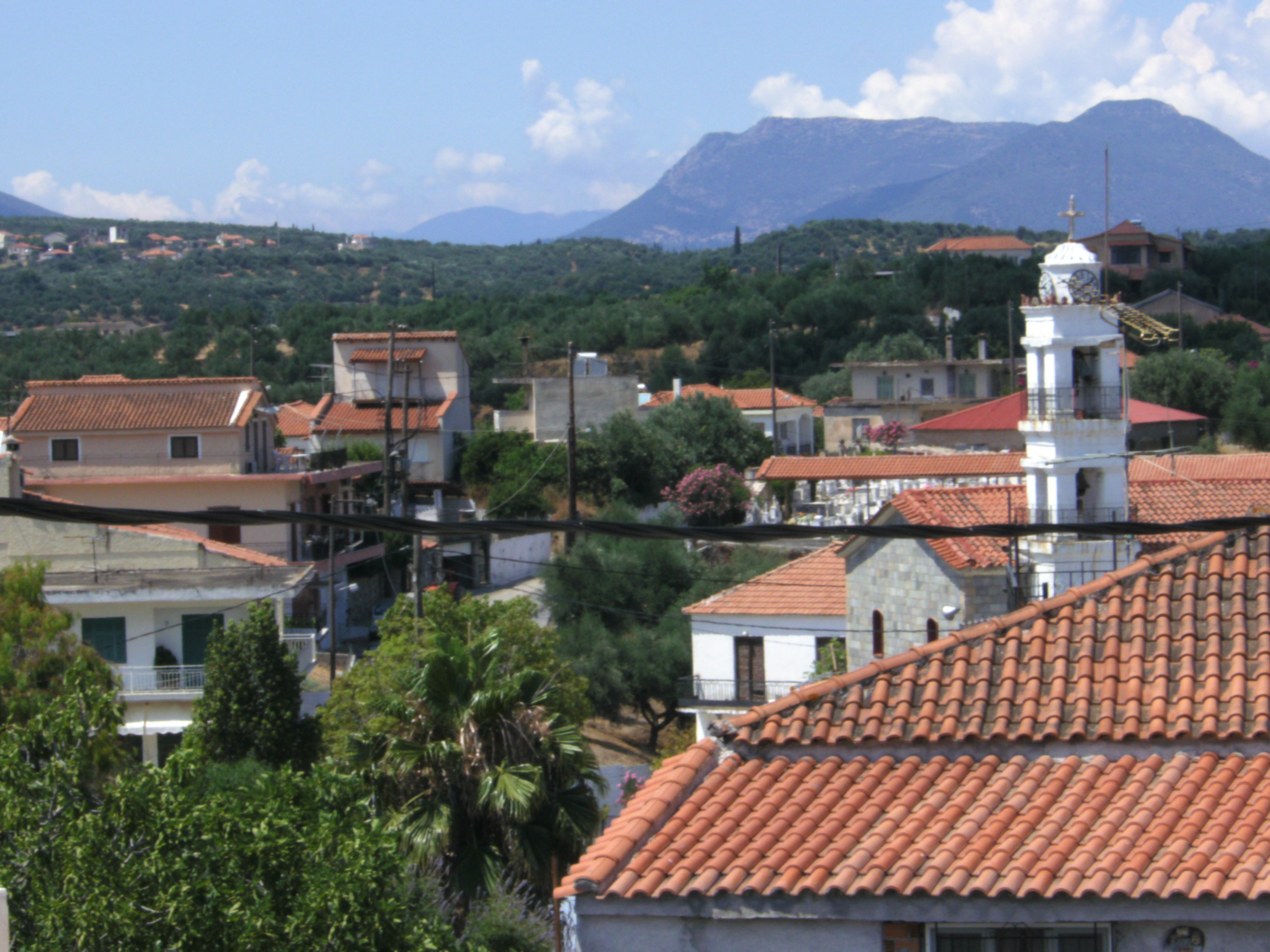
- North Side of the village

- Location within Greece
- Coordinates: 37°2′N 22°2′E
- Country: Greece
- Administrative region: Peloponnese
- Regional unit: Messenia
- Municipality: Messini
- Municipal unit: Messini

Area
  - Community: 8.12 km^{2} (3.14 sq mi)
- Elevation: 68 m (223 ft)

Population (2021)
  - Community: 424
  - Density: 52.2/km^{2} (135/sq mi)
- Time zone: UTC+2 (EET)
  - Summer (DST): UTC+3 (EEST)
- Area code: 27220
- Vehicle registration: KM

Avramiou is a village in Messenia, southern Greece. It was built before 1816; it had 32 families then. During the Turkish occupation, it was a village of Koroni province, and became a village of Messini province and capital of Leukothea Municipality ( now defunct) in 1835. In August 1840, Avramiou became a village of Aristomenis Municipality; it was almost destroyed by earthquakes in 1846. The primary school of Avramiou was founded in 1860. Ten years after, Avramiou became the capital of Aristomeni Municipality. Today, it is a community of the municipality Messini. The community contains the villages Drakoneri, Agios Avgoustinos and Avramiou.

== Location ==
Avramiou is 10 km from Messini and 5.5 km from the beach. Some villages near Avramiou are: Lefkochora, Lykotrafos, Madena, Neochori, and Strefi.

== Population ==
Year	Village population	Record
1816	32 families	Dimitrios Freretos record
1851	56 families	>>
1860	373	>>
1896	615	>>
1920	679	>>
1928	739	Community record
1940	933	>>
1982	856	>>
1984	450	>>
1991	420	>>
2001	413	>>
2011	466	Census
2021	424	Census
