= Aristomenis =

Aristomenis Greek: Αριστομένης
- Municipal unit
- Location within the regional unit

- Location within Greece
- Coordinates: 37°05′N 21°50′E
- Country: Greece
- Administrative region: Peloponnese
- Regional unit: Messenia
- Municipality: Messini

Area
  - Municipal unit: 90.678 km^{2} (35.011 sq mi)

Population (2021)
  - Municipal unit: 1,696
  - Municipal unit density: 18.70/km^{2} (48.44/sq mi)
  - Community: 267
- Time zone: UTC+2 (EET)
  - Summer (DST): UTC+3 (EEST)
- Vehicle registration: ΚΜ

Aristomenis (Greek: Αριστομένης) is a village and a former municipality in Messenia, Peloponnese, Greece. Since the 2011 local government reform it has been part of the municipality of Messini, of which it is a municipal unit. The municipal unit has an area of 90.678 km^{2}. Its population was 1,696 in 2021.
