= Tripyla =

Tripyla Τριπύλα
- Municipal unit
- Location within the regional unit

- Location within Greece
- Coordinates: 37°11′N 21°45′E
- Country: Greece
- Administrative region: Peloponnese
- Regional unit: Messenia
- Municipality: Trifylia

Area
  - Municipal unit: 69.7 km^{2} (26.9 sq mi)

Population (2021)
  - Municipal unit: 255
  - Municipal unit density: 3.66/km^{2} (9.48/sq mi)
  - Community: 33
- Time zone: UTC+2 (EET)
  - Summer (DST): UTC+3 (EEST)
- Vehicle registration: ΚΜ

Tripyla (Greek: Τριπύλα) is a former community in Messenia, Peloponnese, Greece. Since the 2011 local government reform it is part of the municipality Trifylia, of which it is a municipal unit. The municipal unit has an area of 69.696 km^{2}. Population 255 (2021). The seat of the community was in Raptopoulo.
