= Mathia, Messenia =

Mathia Μαθία
- Community
- Location within Greece
- Coordinates: 36°55′27″N 21°53′14″E
- Country: Greece
- Administrative region: Peloponnese
- Regional unit: Messenia
- Municipality: Messini
- Municipal unit: Petalidi

Population (2021)
  - Community: 52
- Time zone: UTC+2 (EET)
  - Summer (DST): UTC+3 (EEST)

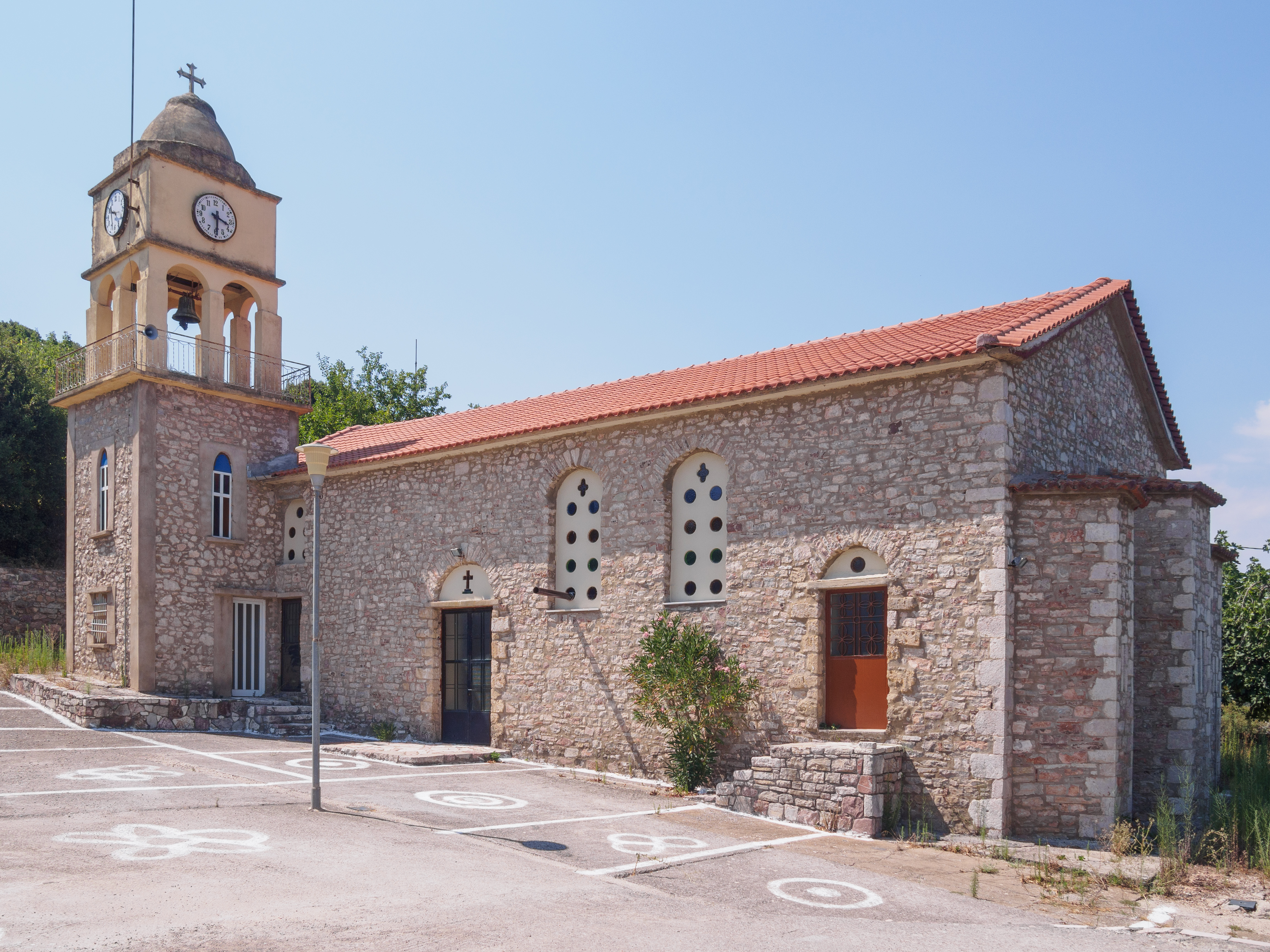

Mathia (Greek: Μαθία, before 1927: Δράγκα - Dragka) is a small village located near the top of the Mount Lycodimos. It is part of the municipal unit of Petalidi, in Messenia, Greece, 7 kilometres from the coastline. Under Ottoman occupation, it was referred to as Draga. Pirates had destroyed its original location. In the Greek War of Independence in 1821, the legendary Captain Yannis Makriyannis (Γιάννης Μαακρυγιαννης) a.k.a. Iannis Triantaphyllou and his heroic men destroyed the Turkish army. His monument stands in the village's entrance, as a reminder to the new generations.
