= Platania, Kozani =

Platania Πλατανιά
- Community
- Location within Greece
- Coordinates: 40°22.922′N 21°20.86967′E
- Country: Greece
- Administrative region: Western Macedonia
- Regional unit: Kozani
- Municipality: Voio
- Municipal unit: Neapoli
- Elevation: 680 m (2,230 ft)

Population (2021)
  - Community: 88
- Time zone: UTC+2 (EET)
  - Summer (DST): UTC+3 (EEST)
- Postal code: 500 01
- Area code: +30-2461
- Vehicle registration: ΚΖ

Platania (Greek: Πλατανιά, before 1927: Μπομπούστιον – Bompoustion), is a village and a community in the Voio municipality of Greece. Before the 2011 local government reform it was part of the municipality of Neapoli, of which it was a municipal district. The 2021 census recorded 88 inhabitants in the village.

In the late Ottoman period, it was inhabited by Vallahades; in the 1900 statistics of Vasil Kanchov, where the town appears under its Bulgarian name "Bobusht'"/"Bobushta", it was inhabited by some 300 "Greek Muslims".

Bompoustion was a mixed village and a part of its population were Greek speaking Muslim Vallahades. The 1920 Greek census recorded 290 people in the village, and 280 inhabitants (50 families) were Muslim in 1923. Following the Greek–Turkish population exchange, Greek refugee families in Bompoustion were from Pontus (73) in 1926. The 1928 Greek census recorded 213 village inhabitants. In 1928, the refugee families numbered 72 (236 people).
