= Vlachopoulo =

Vlachopoulo Βλαχόπουλο
- Community
- Location within Greece
- Coordinates: 37°01′52″N 21°47′28″E
- Country: Greece
- Administrative region: Peloponnese
- Regional unit: Messenia
- Municipality: Pylos-Nestoras
- Municipal unit: Papaflessas

Population (2021)
  - Community: 682
- Time zone: UTC+2 (EET)
  - Summer (DST): UTC+3 (EEST)

Vlachopoulo is the central village of the municipal unit of Papaflessas in the center of Messenia, Greece. The village is located 38 km from the capital of the prefecture Kalamata and 20 km from the nearest beach. Vlachopoulo is a rural village, the main products are olives, raisins and grapes. The village is famous for the festival of which every year become the Holy Spirit. Many people from across Messinia ascend on the first morning to Panagitsa chapel atop Magklavas mountain where the view is spectacular and the evening continues with bouzouki at the village.
