= Palaio Loutro =

Palaio Loutro Παλαιό Λουτρό
- Community
- Location within Greece
- Coordinates: 37°6′N 21°46′E
- Country: Greece
- Administrative region: Peloponnese
- Regional unit: Messenia
- Municipality: Pylos-Nestor
- Municipal unit: Nestoras
- Elevation: 540 m (1,770 ft)

Population (2021)
  - Community: 21
- Time zone: UTC+2 (EET)
  - Summer (DST): UTC+3 (EEST)
- Postal code: 24600

Palaio Loutro (Greek: Παλαιό Λουτρό) is a small mountain village in Messenia, Peloponnese, Southern Greece. It is located a few kilometres from Chora, the site of Nestor's Palace, and the seaside port of Pylos. Palaio Loutro means "old bath" in reference to the river that runs between the village and a mountain the locals refer to as "o koufieros".

Before World War II, Palaio Loutro had a thriving agricultural community. It suffered immensely from the occupation of Greece between 1941 and 1944; residents fled Nazi forces and sought refuge in the nearby mountains when Palaio Loutro was set alight to avenge the death of German troops in the area as a result of battles with the Greek Resistance. The village also suffered as a result of the Greek Civil War that ravaged Greece between 1946 and 1949.

In the 1950s and 1960s, many of its young people emigrated primarily to Australia but also to the United States and Germany. Others left for nearby larger Messinian towns and to the prefecture's capital, Kalamata. Many also settled in Greece's capital, Athens.

Palaio Loutro is known for the river that passes near the village, its scenic views and its annual patron saint festival (panigyri) held in the summer that attracts many visitors, including children and grandchildren of the village's former residents. In recent years, former residents of the village and their descendants have begun rebuilding their ancestral homes which are used in the summer months.

The town has two churches, Saint Demetrius and Saints Anargyroi (Cosmas and Damian). The latter was carved out of the mountain facing the village and many residents sought refuge there when Palaio Loutro was set alight by the Nazis in World War II.

== See also ==
- List of settlements in Messenia
- Loutro, Messenia (a distinct town)
