= Loutro, Messenia =

Loutro Λουτρό
- Community
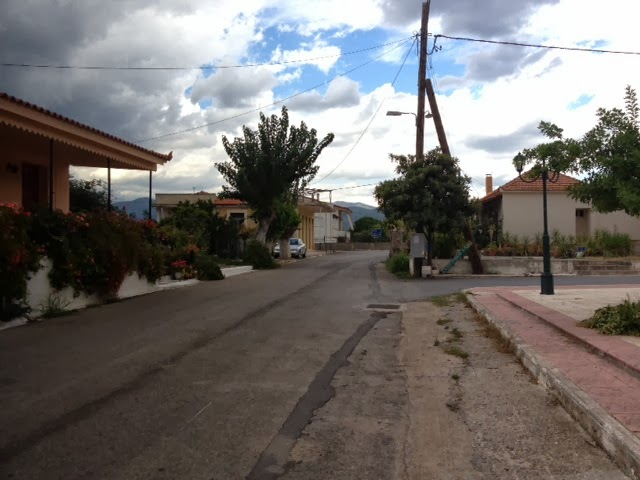
- Loutro

- Location within Greece
- Coordinates: 37°15′N 22°00′E
- Country: Greece
- Administrative region: Peloponnese
- Regional unit: Messenia
- Municipality: Oichalia
- Municipal unit: Oichalia
- Elevation: 105 m (344 ft)

Population (2021)
  - Community: 81
- Time zone: UTC+2 (EET)
  - Summer (DST): UTC+3 (EEST)
- Postal code: 24002

Loutro (Greek, Modern: Λουτρό) is a small town in the municipality of Oichalia, Messenia, Peloponnese, Southern Greece. There is a small church in the east side of the town and a large square where children play soccer and hide-and-seek. Five other small towns surround Loutro: Filia, Meligalas, Malta, Meropi, and Oichalia.

== See also ==
- List of settlements in Messenia
- Palaio Loutro
