= Vlasis =

Vlasis is both a given name and a surname. Notable people with the name include:

- Evangelos Vlasis (1944), Greek athlete
- Vlasis Gavriilidis (1848–1920), Greek journalist
- Vlasis Kazakis (1983), retired Greek footballer
- Vlasis Maras (1983), Greek gymnast
- Vlasis Vlaikidis (1965), Greek basketball coach

== See also ==
- Vlassis
