= Agios Floros =

Agios Floros Άγιος Φλώρος
- Community
- Location within Greece
- Coordinates: 37°10′01″N 22°01′34″E
- Country: Greece
- Administrative region: Peloponnese
- Regional unit: Messenia
- Municipality: Kalamata
- Municipal unit: Arfara

Population (2021)
  - Community: 190
- Time zone: UTC+2 (EET)
  - Summer (DST): UTC+3 (EEST)

Agios Floros (Greek: Άγιος Φλώρος) is a village and a community in the municipal unit of Arfara, Messenia, southern Greece. The community consists of the villages Agios Floros and Christofilaiika. It is located on the National Road 7 Kalamata - Corinth, about 20 km north of Kalamata. The population of the community was 190 in 2021.

== See also ==
- List of settlements in Messenia
