= Agios Sostis =

Agios Sostis Άγιος Σώστης
- Community
- Location within Greece
- Coordinates: 37°26′39″N 21°57′15″E
- Country: Greece
- Administrative region: Peloponnese
- Regional unit: Messenia
- Municipality: Oichalia
- Municipal unit: Eira

Population (2021)
  - Community: 37
- Time zone: UTC+2 (EET)
  - Summer (DST): UTC+3 (EEST)

Agios Sostis is a small village located at the borders of Arcadia, Elis and Messenia regional units, in southern Greece. It is part of the municipality Oichalia in Messenia. It lies at an altitude of 850 m (2,790 ft) measured at the bridge and 900 m (3,000 ft) measured at the upper part of the village.

Agios Sostis' history is closely related to the historical region of Gorena – the ancient city of Lykoa according to archaeologists - situated in the northwestern part of Mount Lykaion and next to the settlement of Tsouraki (a Turkish word for a small hut).

Agios Sostis is mostly known for the church of Saint John (Agios Ioannis or Ayannis in Greek). The church is built on the ruins of a Byzantine monastery that the Franks destroyed in the 14th century. Excavations began after a vision seen by Yannis Constantopoulos. During these excavations, 60 cells, a golden tong, a chalice and a limestone cross were found. The neighboring villages contributed to the construction of the church and established an annual feast held at the August 29, attracting many visitors from nearby villages.

Four men from Agios Sostis were among the passengers aboard the RMS Titanic during its maiden voyage in April 1912: Apostolos Chronopoulos, Dimitrios Chronopoulos, Panagiotis Lymperopoulos and Vasilios Katavelos. The four men were travelling to the United States in search of economic opportunities and were travelling in third class. The Chronopoulos passengers were brothers. All four died when the RMS Titanic sank in the North Atlantic on 15 April 1912. A memorial commemorating the four men was erected in Agios Sostis in 2001, near the church of Agios Ioannis.

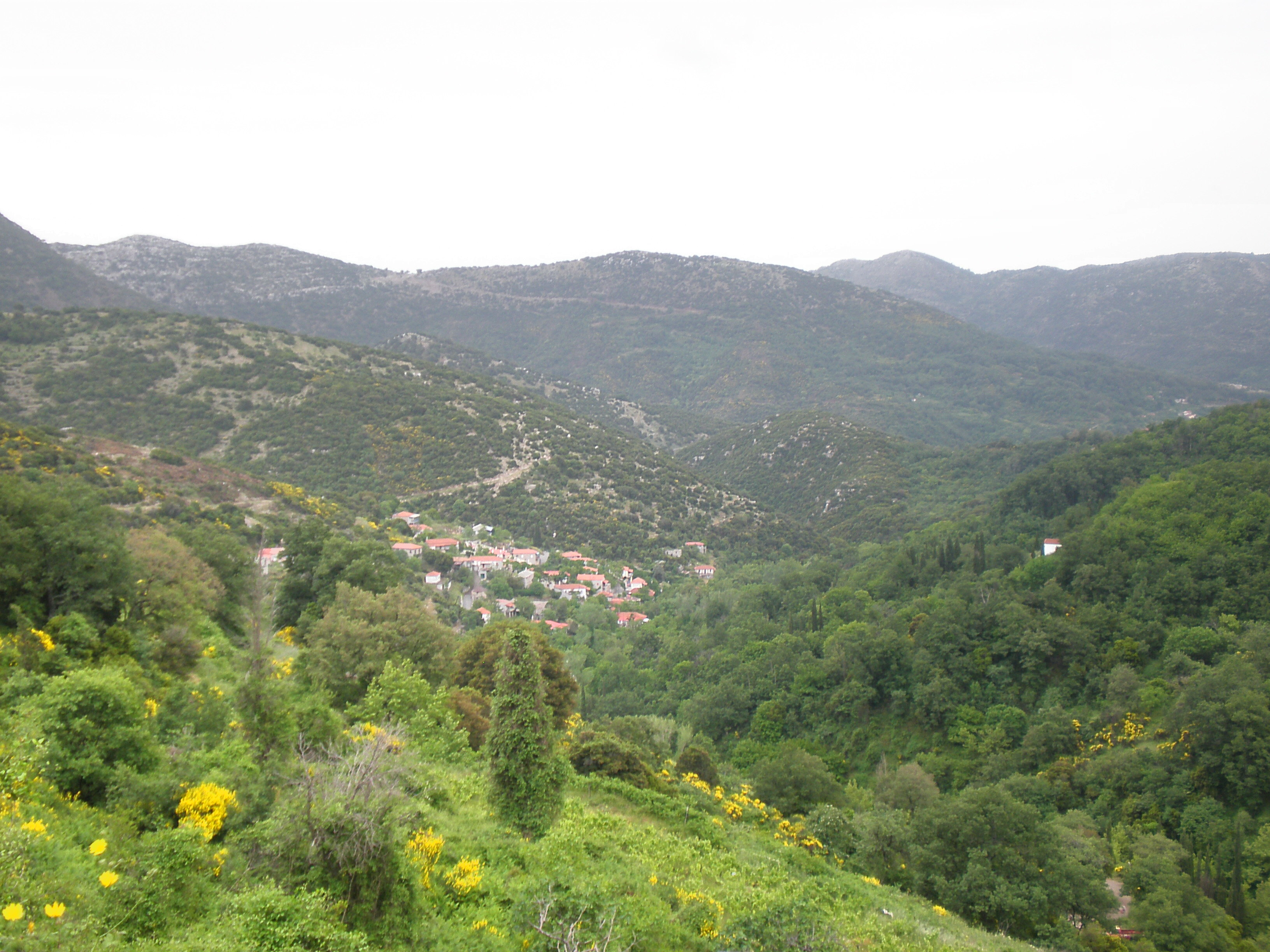
View of the village

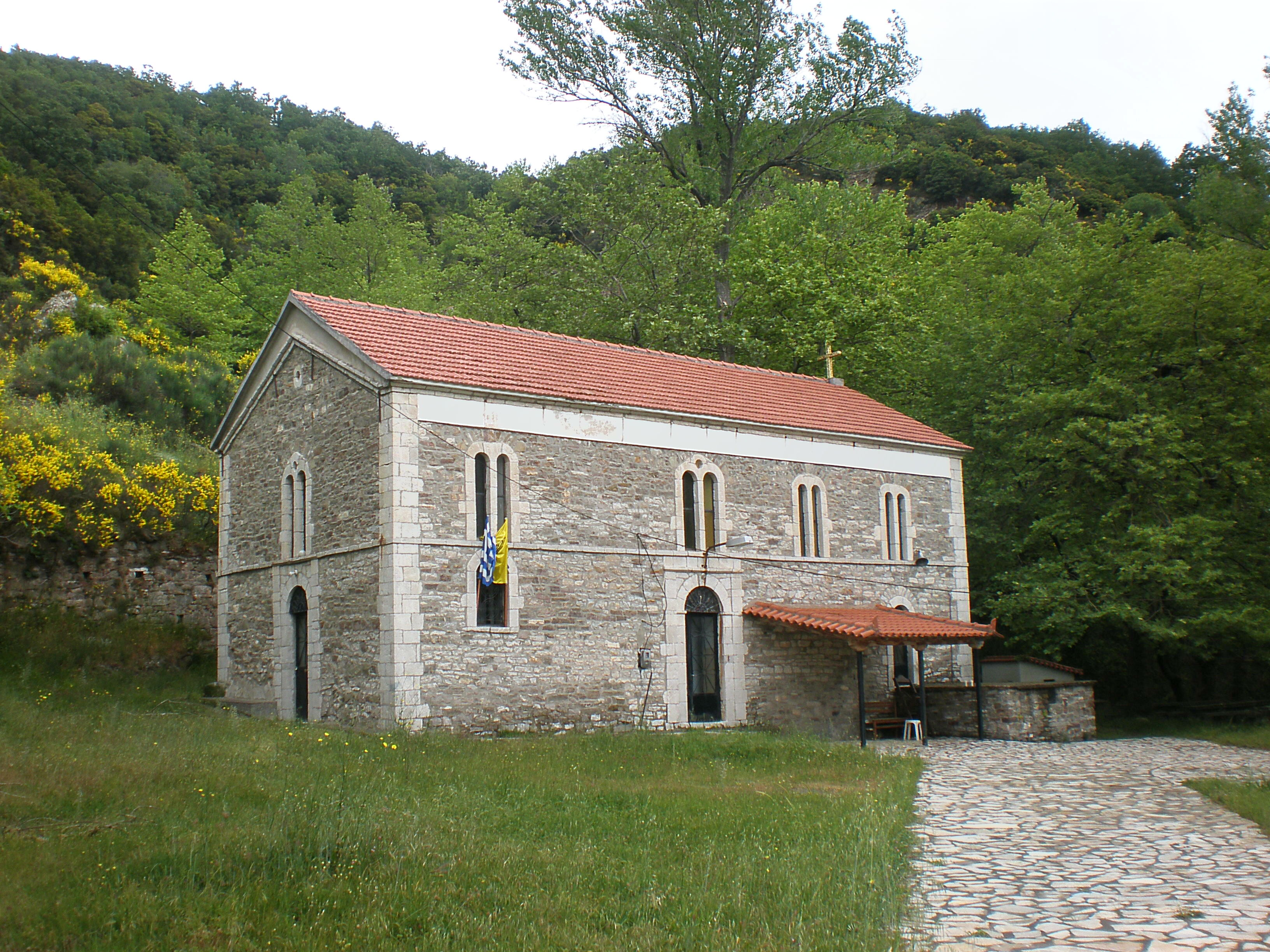
The church of Ayannis
