= Arfara =

Arfara Αρφαρά
- Municipal unit
- Location within the regional unit

- Location within Greece
- Coordinates: 37°09′N 22°02′E
- Country: Greece
- Administrative region: Peloponnese
- Regional unit: Messenia
- Municipality: Kalamata

Area
  - Municipal unit: 87.615 km^{2} (33.828 sq mi)

Population (2021)
  - Municipal unit: 2,364
  - Municipal unit density: 26.98/km^{2} (69.88/sq mi)
  - Community: 1,164
- Time zone: UTC+2 (EET)
  - Summer (DST): UTC+3 (EEST)
- Vehicle registration: ΚΜ

Arfara (Greek: Αρφαρά) is a village and a former municipality in Messenia, Peloponnese, Greece. Since the 2011 local government reform it is part of the municipality Kalamata, of which it is a municipal unit. The municipal unit has an area of 87.615 km^{2}. Population 2,364 (2021). The village of Arfara lies about 15 km from Kalamata. Its name is taken from the first people who lived in Upper Arfara, the Arfaras, some of whom still live in Simi and Rodos. It was the seat of the former Arfara municipality. Arfara has 4 small areas called Servia, Lafazaneika, Skomara and Karagiorgaika.

== Subdivisions ==
The municipal unit Arfara is subdivided into the following communities (constituent villages in brackets):

- Agios Floros (Agios Floros, Christofilaiika)
- Agrilos
- Arfara (Arfara, Agios Konstantinos, Ano Arfara)
- Pidima
- Platy
- Stamatinou (Stamatinou, Pelekito)
- Velanidia
- Vromovrisi (Vromovrisi, Ano Vromovrisi, Dremi, Krasopoula)
