= Greek National Road 9 =

Trunk road in Greece

National Road 9
- Εθνική Οδός 9
- Route of the EO9 road, in blue

Route information
- Part of E55 (Pyrgos–Kalo Nero)
- Length: 217.6 km (135.2 mi)
- Existed: 9 July 1963–present

Major junctions
- North end: Patras
- South end: Methoni

Location
- Country: Greece
- Regions: Western Greece; Peloponnese
- Primary destinations: Patras; Kato Achaia; Pyrgos; Kyparissia; Pylos; Methoni

Highway system
- Highways in Greece; Motorways; National roads
| ← EO8a | → EO9a |

Greek National Road 9 (Greek: Εθνική Οδός 9), abbreviated as the EO9, is a national road in the western Peloponnese in Greece. The EO9 runs along the west coast of the peninsula, from Patras to Methoni via Pyrgos and Kalo Nero: the EO9a is a branch of the EO9, from Kalo Nero to the A7 motorway at Tsakona. The section between Pyrgos and Tsakona is also part of European route E55.

The Greek government plans to replace the EO9a and part of the EO9 with the A5 motorway (Ionia Odos), between Patras and Tsakona: the first section of the A5, between Patras and Pyrgos, was delivered in 2025.

== Route ==
The EO9 is officially defined as a north–south coastal route through the Achaea, Elis and Messenia regional units of the Peloponnese, running between Patras to the north and Methoni to the south, via Kato Achaia, Pyrgos, Kyparissia and Pylos. The EO9 forms part of the European route E55 from Mintilogli – where the A5 motorway currently ends – to Kalo Nero.

== History ==
Ministerial Decision G25871 of 9 July 1963 created the EO9 from one half of the old EO51 between Patras and Methoni, which existed by royal decree from 1955 to 1963, and also followed the same route as the current EO9. In 1998, the Hellenic Statistical Authority created the EO9a as a branch of the EO9, from Kalo Nero to Tsakona, taking over some of the Messenia regional unit's provincial roads.
