= Asprochoma, Messenia =

Asprochoma Ασπρόχωμα
- Community
- Location within Greece
- Coordinates: 37°02′52″N 22°04′29″E
- Country: Greece
- Administrative region: Peloponnese
- Regional unit: Messenia
- Municipality: Kalamata
- Municipal unit: Kalamata

Population (2021)
  - Community: 1,244
- Time zone: UTC+2 (EET)
  - Summer (DST): UTC+3 (EEST)

Asprochoma (Greek: Ασπρόχωμα, "white soil") is a village in Messenia, Greece. It is part of the municipality Kalamata.

== Location ==
Asprochoma is located in an altitude of 19 meters and is 4 kilometres west of Kalamata. At the bounties of Asprochoma and Kalamata is located the main factory of Karelia Tobacco Company

== Railway Connection ==
Asprochoma Railway Station opened in 1892 and it served Piraeus, Athens and Peloponnese Railways. On the plans of Messinian Suburban Railway it is expected to connect Messinia - Kalamata line with Kalamata - Korinthos (Athens) line, like it used to. Services stopped in 2011 after the financial crises.
