= Kalo Nero =

Kalo Nero Καλό Νερό
- Community
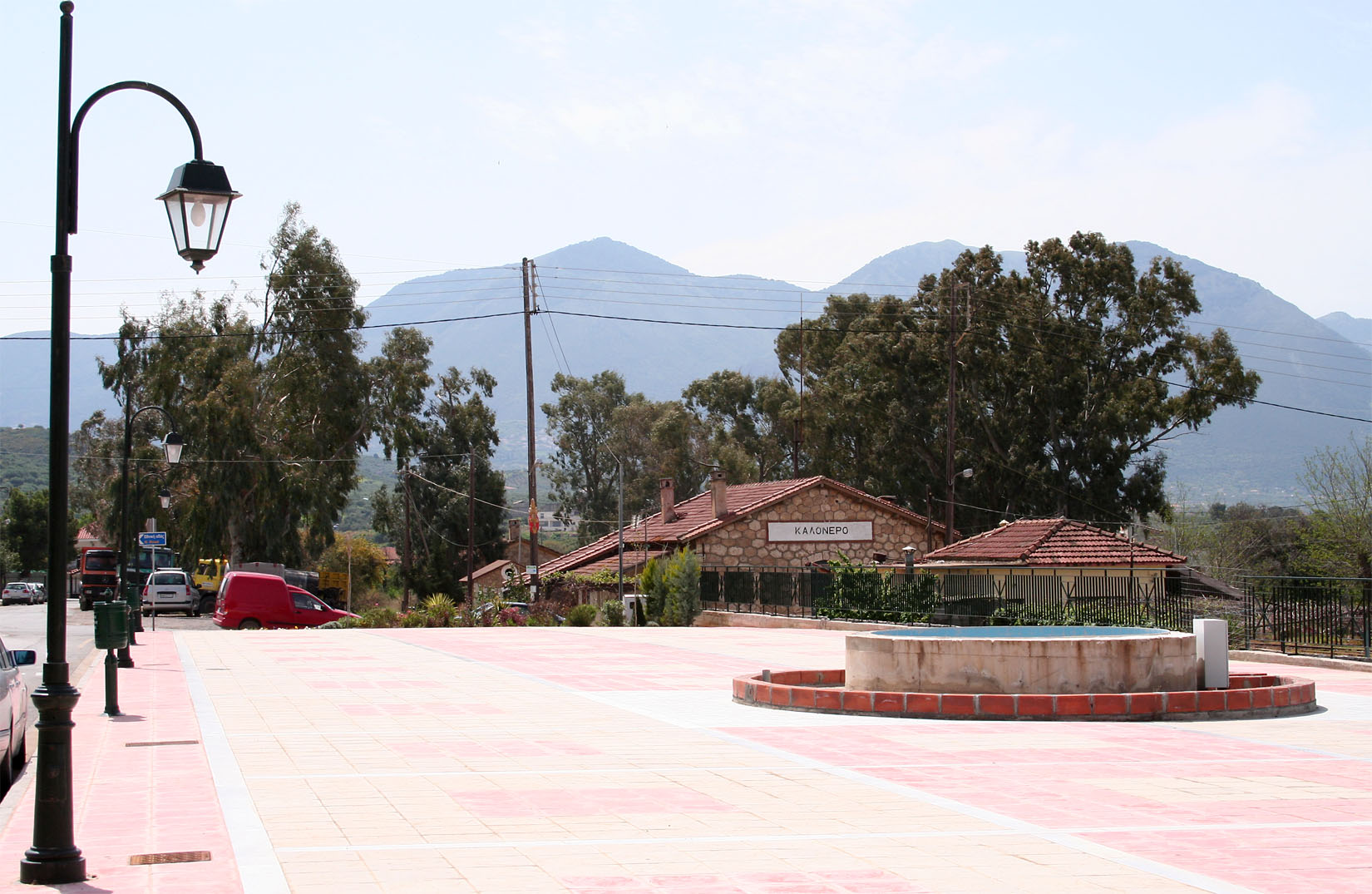
- Kalo Nero square, with the railway station behind

- Location within Greece
- Coordinates: 37°17′53″N 21°42′04″E
- Country: Greece
- Administrative region: Peloponnese
- Regional unit: Messenia
- Municipality: Trifylia
- Municipal unit: Avlonas

Population (2021)
  - Community: 559
- Time zone: UTC+2 (EET)
  - Summer (DST): UTC+3 (EEST)

Kalo Nero or Kalonero (Greek: Καλό Νερό or Καλόνερο meaning "good water") is a village and a community of the Trifylia municipality, Messenia, southern Greece. The population of the community is 559 (2021 census), including the smaller settlements Ano Kalo Nero, Kakavas, Stasi Sidirokastro (Sidirokastro station, a railway halt), Marmaro and Vounaki.

== Geography ==
Kalo Nero is situated on the Gulf of Kyparissia, a bay of the Ionian Sea. It is 6 km northeast of Kyparissia, 21 km south of Zacharo and 47 km northwest of Kalamata. The Greek National Road 9 (Patras - Pyrgos - Pylos), and the main road to Kalamata pass through the town. Kalo Nero is a railway junction where the line from Patras and Pyrgos in the north branches to the terminus station of Kyparissia to the south and towards Kalamata via Zevgolatio in the east. Kalo Nero has a relatively large railway yard, located alongside the central square of the village, with the station building at the southern end of the square. Kalo Nero used to have several daily passenger train services but during recent years these have been reduced until 21-Jan-2011 the last remaining services were closed down.

== Tourism and the environment ==
Kalo Nero has a 20 kilometre sandy beach which attracts a moderate amount of bathers in the summer months, both Greeks and foreign tourists. On the seafront there are a number hotels, tavernas and bars. From May to July. Loggerhead sea turtles nest on the beach, with the nests hatching between July and October. Nearby are the Mycenian Tombs in Peristeria and the Neda River Waterfalls.
