= Kalyvia, Messenia =

Kalyvia Καλύβια
- Settlement
- Location within Greece
- Coordinates: 37°14′45″N 22°1′35″E
- Country: Greece
- Administrative region: Peloponnese
- Regional unit: Messenia
- Municipality: Oichalia
- Municipal unit: Oichalia
- Elevation: 145 m (476 ft)

Population (2021)
  - Total: 81
- Time zone: UTC+2 (EET)
  - Summer (DST): UTC+3 (EEST)
- Postal code: 240 02
- Area code: 2724

Kalyvia (Greek: Καλύβια), formerly Rereika Kalyvia (Ρερέικα Καλύβια) until 1912, is a village in Messenia, Greece. It is located at an altitude of 145 metres (476 feet) above sea level, and has a population of 81 residents.

== Geography ==
Kalyvia is a small village located at an altitude of 145 metres (476 feet) above sea level, in the Peloponnese peninsula. It became part of the municipality of Oichalia on 21 April 1835, and since the local government reform of the Kallikratis Programme in 2011, the municipal unit of Oichalia.

== History ==
The Morea expedition of 1828–1833 recorded Kalyvia as Rhézéika, a village in the sector of Lakki in the province of Leontari (French: Léondari). The expedition recorded a population of 11 families and a total population of 46: the archives of Ioannis Kapodistrias recorded the village as "Kalyvia", with same number of families and population.

According to the Greek Society for Local Development and Local Government, Kalyvia was previously known as Rereika Kalyvia (Greek: Ρερέικα Καλύβια) until 1912.

== Demographics ==
According to the 2021 census, Kalyvia had 81 permanent residents.

== Transportation ==
Kalyvia is accessible by a local road, 1.55 kilometres (0.96 miles) off the EO7 road at Allagi. The EO7 provides access to the A7 motorway and the EO9a, which all converge at the Tsakona interchange, located 543 metres (594 yards) northwest of the village: Tsakona is also where European routes E55 and E65 merge (from Pyrgos and Tripoli respectively), towards Kalamata.
