= Trikorfo, Messenia =

Trikorfo Τρίκορφο
- Municipal unit
- Location within the regional unit

- Location within Greece
- Coordinates: 37°08′N 21°52′E
- Country: Greece
- Administrative region: Peloponnese
- Regional unit: Messenia
- Municipality: Messini

Area
  - Municipal unit: 42.938 km^{2} (16.578 sq mi)
- Elevation: 398 m (1,306 ft)

Population (2021)
  - Municipal unit: 473
  - Municipal unit density: 11.0/km^{2} (28.5/sq mi)
  - Community: 274
- Time zone: UTC+2 (EET)
  - Summer (DST): UTC+3 (EEST)
- Vehicle registration: ΚΜ

Trikorfo (Greek: Τρίκορφο) is a former community in Messenia, Peloponnese, Greece. Since the 2011 local government reform it is part of the municipality Messini, of which it is a municipal unit. The municipal unit has an area of 42.938 km^{2}. Population 473 (2021). The average altitude of Trikorfo village is 398 meters. It is famous place because of the extra quality of olives. The seat of the community was Trikorfo. Predominantly a farming region, the principal exports include kalamata olives, olive oil and figs. The community was divided into Trikorfo, Mavros Logkos, Chilia Spitia, Draina Klima, Koromilea, Palaiokastro, Kinigos. Trikorfo village is also known as Pentias. Common family names in Trikorfo include Skoufis and Katsipodas.

== Notable people ==
- Pantelis Dionysopoulos (1909–1941), hero of World War II
- Fred Smerlas, Greek-American player of American football
- Sakis Theodoropoulos, journalist
- Despoina Drepania, actor
- Olia Nikolopoulou, lawyer and politician
