= Avlonas, Messenia =

Avlonas Αυλώνας
- Municipal unit
- Location within the regional unit

- Location within Greece
- Coordinates: 37°21′58″N 21°48′11″E
- Country: Greece
- Administrative region: Peloponnese
- Regional unit: Messenia
- Municipality: Trifylia

Area
  - Municipal unit: 112.9 km^{2} (43.6 sq mi)

Population (2021)
  - Municipal unit: 1,325
  - Municipal unit density: 11.74/km^{2} (30.40/sq mi)
  - Community: 120
- Time zone: UTC+2 (EET)
  - Summer (DST): UTC+3 (EEST)
- Vehicle registration: ΚΜ

Avlonas (Greek: Αυλώνας) is a village and a former municipality in Messenia, Peloponnese, Greece. Since the 2011 local government reform it is part of the municipality Trifylia, of which it is a municipal unit. The municipal unit has an area of 112.898 km^{2}. Population 1,325 (2021). The seat of the municipality was in Sidirokastro.
