= Alagonia =

Ancient Greek town

Coordinates: 36°57′20″N 22°15′40″E

Alagonia (Ancient Greek: Ἀλαγονία) was a town of ancient Laconia, ancient Greece, near the Messenian frontier, belonging to the Eleuthero-Lacones, containing temples of the Greek gods Dionysus and Artemis. This town was 30 stadia distant from Gerenia.

It took its name from Alagonia, a daughter of Zeus and Europa.

Its site is tentatively located near the modern Anatoliko.
