= Aris, Messenia =

Aris Άρις
- Municipal unit
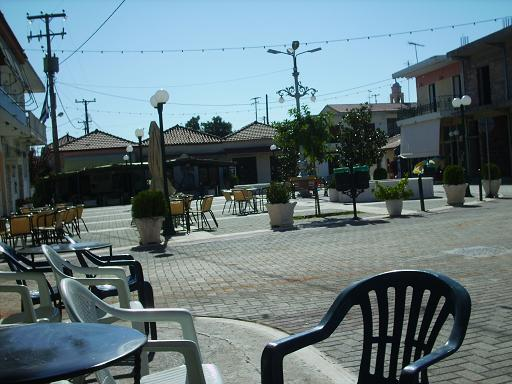
- Village square of Aris

- Location within the regional unit

- Location within Greece
- Coordinates: 37°06′N 22°00′E
- Country: Greece
- Administrative region: Peloponnese
- Regional unit: Messenia
- Municipality: Kalamata

Area
  - Municipal unit: 22.497 km^{2} (8.686 sq mi)

Population (2021)
  - Municipal unit: 1,719
  - Municipal unit density: 76.41/km^{2} (197.9/sq mi)
  - Community: 851
- Time zone: UTC+2 (EET)
  - Summer (DST): UTC+3 (EEST)
- Vehicle registration: ΚΜ

Aris (Greek: Άρις) is a village and a former municipality in Messenia, Peloponnese, Greece. Since the 2011 local government reform it is part of the municipality Kalamata, of which it is a municipal unit. The municipal unit has an area of 22.497 km^{2}. Population 1,719 (2021).
