= Messini =

Messini Μεσσήνη
- Municipality
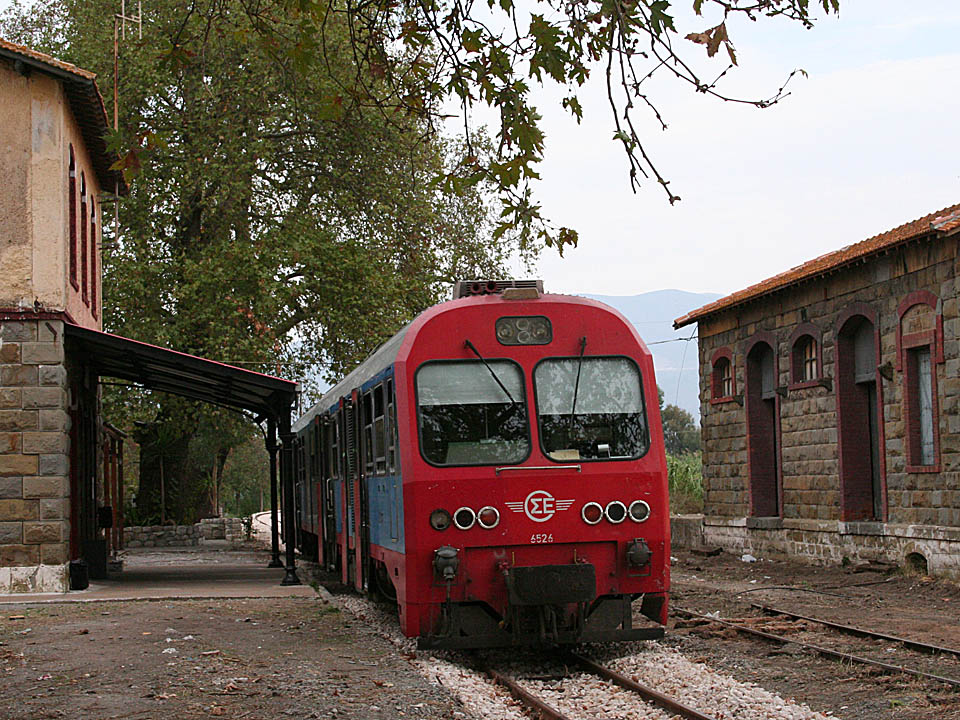
- The old railway station.

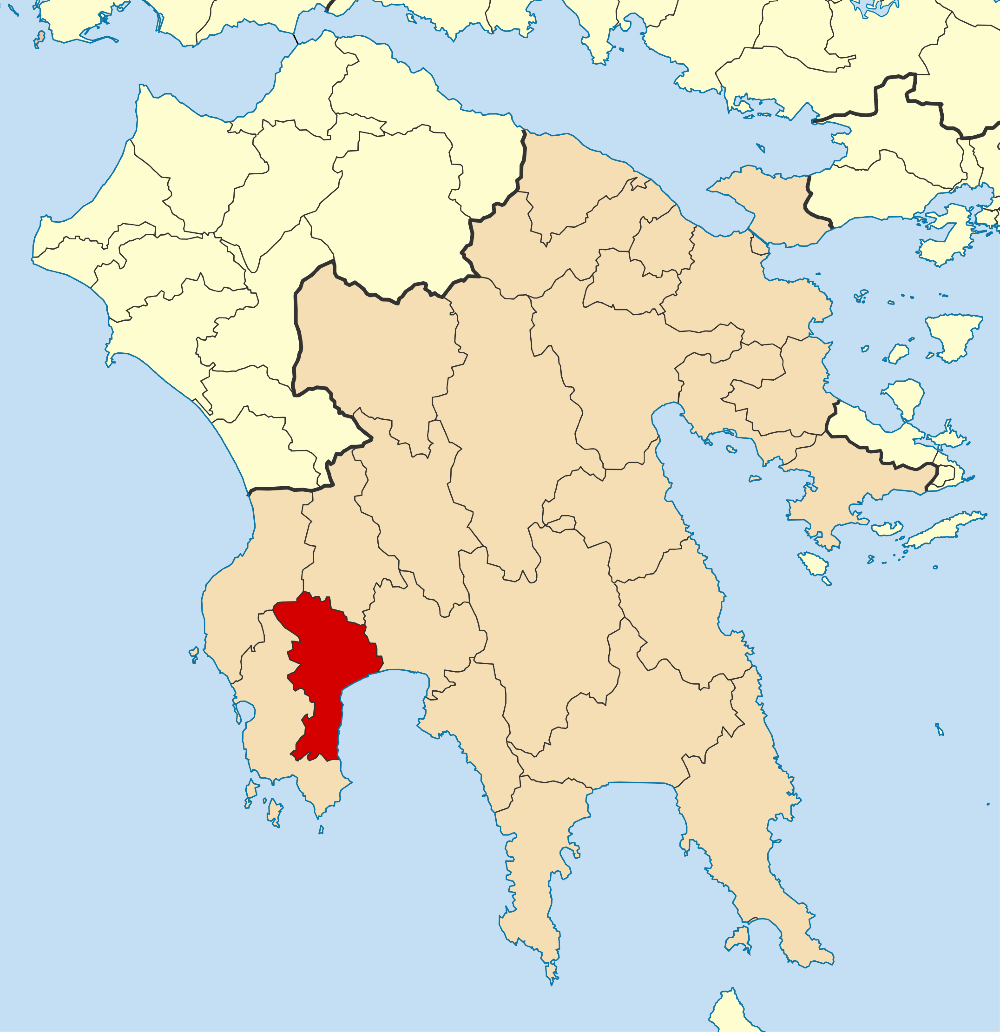

- Location within Greece
- Coordinates: 37°3′N 22°0′E
- Country: Greece
- Administrative region: Peloponnese
- Regional unit: Messenia

Area
  - Municipality: 562.1 km^{2} (217.0 sq mi)
  - Municipal unit: 84.6 km^{2} (32.7 sq mi)
- Elevation: 5 m (16 ft)

Population (2021)
  - Municipality: 19,170
  - Density: 34.10/km^{2} (88.33/sq mi)
  - Municipal unit: 8,937
  - Municipal unit density: 106/km^{2} (274/sq mi)
  - Community: 5,958
- Time zone: UTC+2 (EET)
  - Summer (DST): UTC+3 (EEST)
- Postal code: 242 00
- Area code: 27220
- Vehicle registration: ΚΜ

Messini (Greek: Μεσσήνη, before 1867: Νησί Nisi) is a municipal unit (dimotiki enotita) and the seat town (edra) of the municipality (dimos) of Messini within the regional unit (perifereiaki enotita) of Messenia in the region (perifereia) of Peloponnese, one of 13 regions into which Greece has been divided. Before 2011 the same hierarchy prevailed, according to Law 2539 of 1997, the Kapodistrias Plan, except that Messenia was a nomos and the Municipal unit was a locality (topiko diamerisma). The dimos existed under both laws, but not with the same constituents.

Messini (modern pronunciation) is not to be confused with its ancient namesake, Messene, located 15 kilometres (9.3 miles) to the north in the shadow of Mount Ithome. Ancient Messene is an equally large but abandoned site of ruins partially occupied by the small village of Mavrommati.

== Geography ==
The modern town has some 6,000 inhabitants. It is the second largest municipality of Messinia regional unit. The town centre is 3 km (1.9 mi) from the Messinian Gulf coast, near the right bank of the river Pamisos. The major city of Messinia, Kalamata, is 10 km (6.2 mi) to the east of Messini and has almost 9 times its population. The town is accessed by Greek National Road 82 (Pylos - Kalamata - Sparta). The Kalamata International Airport is two kilometers to the east. Since 1892, Messini had a railway station on a branch line from the Corinth–Kalamata railway known as Messinian Suburban Railway. It was closed in 1976, reopened in 2007.Regular operations on the line ceased in 2011 however, until 2016, when it was rendered unusable due to severe weather damage, it operated seasonally from 20 to 28 September for the Messini fair, as well as during the holiday period from 24 December to 10 January.

== Administration ==
Before the reorganization, the municipality of Messini contained 14 local divisions (topika diamerismata) for a total population of 11041. Since 2010 Messini has still been a municipality, one of the six of Messenia. However, it has absorbed seven other former municipalities. These, and the former municipality of Messini, have become municipal units (dimotikes enotites) of the municipality Messini, with a total population of 19,170 (2021 census). These are as follows:

Municipal unit	Population (2021)
Aipeia	1,319
Androusa	1,800
Aristomenis	1,696
Voufrades	853
Ithomi	1,537
Messini	8,937
Petalidi	2,555
Trikorfo	473

The municipality has an area of 562.06 km^{2} (217.01 sq mi), the municipal unit 84.60 km^{2} (32.66 sq mi). The municipal unit of Messini contains the same subdivisions and populations as did the previous municipality of Messini but the subdivisions are now local communities. These are as follows:

Local community	Population (2021)
Messini (town)	5,958
Avramiou	424
Analipsis	380
Velika	294
Karteroli	374
Lefkochora	184
Lykotrafos	225
Madena	106
Mavrommati Pamisou	406
Neochori	113
Pilalistra	154
Piperitsa	112
Spitali	77
Triodos	130

In summary, Messini is a town, a municipal unit and a municipality.

=== Province ===
The province of Messini (Greek: Επαρχία Μεσσήνης) was one of the provinces of the Messenia Prefecture. Its territory corresponded with that of the current municipality Messini (except the municipal units Aipeia, Petalidi and Voufrades) and the municipal units Andania, Meligalas and Oichalia. It was abolished in 2006.

== History ==
Messini began its communal existence as Nisi, a settlement placed on an island (nēsos, from which Nisi) in the extensive marshland at the mouth of the Pamisos River. It was placed in Frankish territory, the Principality of Achaia, dated 1205-1432, consisting of 40 villages in Messenia and Elis. The ethnic content of the population in the vicinity at that time was Greek. After 1432, when the Byzantine Empire fell and was commandeered by the Ottoman Empire, some Turks entered the region. Except for the names, these distinctions have more or less disappeared in modern Greece.

The government of Greece changed the official name to Messini in 1867. Baedeker's for the later 19th century and early 20th centuries referred to Nisi as "now officially Messini," a phrase that was widely used in travelogues of the period. The earliest Baedeker's to do so is the German edition of 1888. Prior to 1887 Nisi is not treated as Messini. Subsequent references to the place often refer to Nisi as "the popular name".

== Recent population growth ==
The populations of the town for the last few census' are given below.

Census Year	Town population
1981	6,854
1991	6,453
2001	6,912
2011	6,287
2021	5,958

== Notable people ==
- Ioannis Alevras (1912–1995), politician
- Stefanos Linaios (1928–2026), actor

== Bibliography ==
- Hellenic Interior Ministry (18 March 2001). Δείτε τη Διοικητική Διαίρεση (in Greek). Hellenic Interior Ministry.. The previous Kapodistrias organization of all the communities in Greece. The populations are from the Census of 2001.
