= Trifylia =

Trifylia Τριφυλία
- Municipality
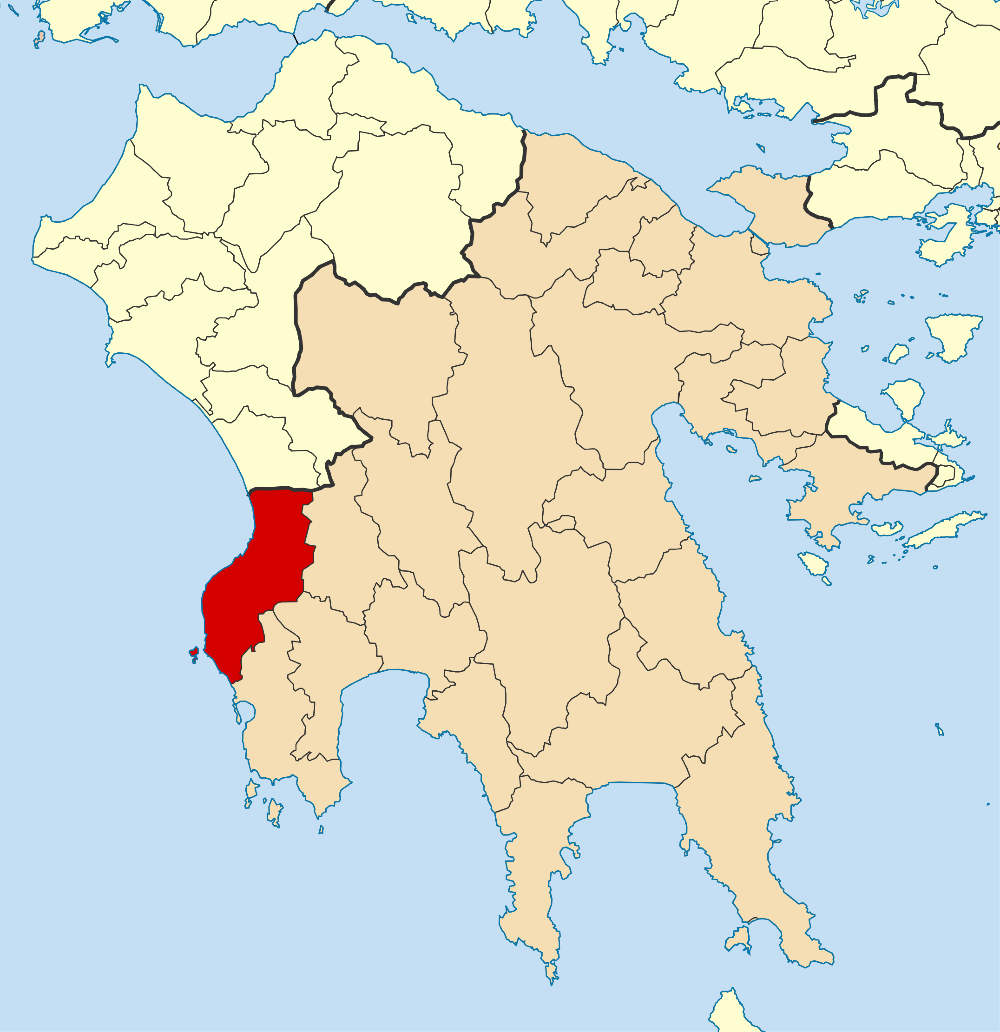

- Location within Greece
- Coordinates: 37°14′N 21°40′E
- Country: Greece
- Administrative region: Peloponnese
- Regional unit: Messenia
- Seat: Kyparissia

Government
  - Mayor: Georgios Leventakis (since 2019)

Area
  - Municipality: 616.0 km^{2} (237.8 sq mi)

Population (2021)
  - Municipality: 22,431
  - Density: 36.41/km^{2} (94.31/sq mi)
- Time zone: UTC+2 (EET)
  - Summer (DST): UTC+3 (EEST)
- Website: Official website

Trifylia (Greek: Τριφυλία) is a municipality in the Messenia regional unit, Peloponnese, Greece. The seat of the municipality is the town Kyparissia. The municipality has an area of 616.019 km^{2}. It was named after the ancient Triphylia region.

== Municipality ==
The municipality Trifylia was formed at the 2011 local government reform by the merger of the following 6 former municipalities, that became municipal units:

- Aetos
- Avlonas
- Filiatra
- Gargalianoi
- Kyparissia
- Tripyla

=== Province ===
The province of Trifylia (Greek: Επαρχία Τριφυλίας) was one of the provinces of the Messenia Prefecture. Its territory corresponded with that of the current municipality Trifylia and the municipal units Dorio, Eira and Nestoras. The province was founded in 1833, comprising the northern part of the newly formed Messenia Prefecture. It was abolished with the administrative reform of 1836, but re-established in 1848. In 1899, along with the neighbouring Olympia Province (until then part of the Elis Prefecture), it formed the short-lived Trifylia Prefecture, which was abolished in 1909. The province of Trifylia was abolished in 2006.
