= Kalama (disambiguation) =

Kalama (1817–1870) was a Queen Consort of Hawaii.

Kalama may also refer to:

- Kalama, Washington, a city in Cowlitz County, Washington
- Kalama Atoll, Hawaiian name for Johnston Atoll
- Kalama Sutta, a Buddhist scripture
- Kamalatmika/Kalama, a Hindu Goddess
- Kalama (bug), a genus of heteropteran bugs

== People with the surname ==
- Benny Kalama Falsetto singer and musician from Hawaii
- Dave Kalama, Hawaiian big wave surfer, windsurfer, and celebrity watersports enthusiast
- Simon P. Kalama (died 1875), Hawaiian politician and engraver

== Places ==
- Kālāma, an Iron Age Indo-Aryan tribe

== See also ==
- Kamala (disambiguation)
  - Kamala Harris, vice president of the United States
  - Kamala (name), a Sanskrit-language name
- Calama (disambiguation)
- Kalamai (disambiguation)
