= Kalamata =

City on the Peloponnese in southern Greece

Kalamata Καλαμάτα
- Municipality
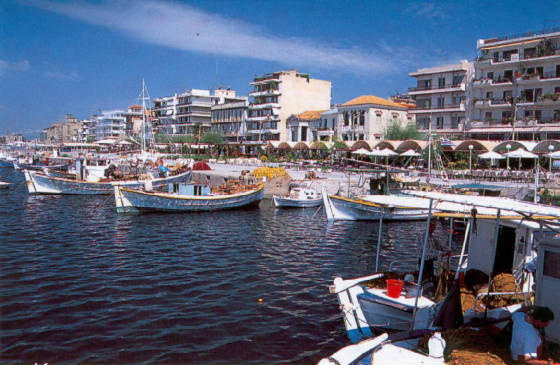
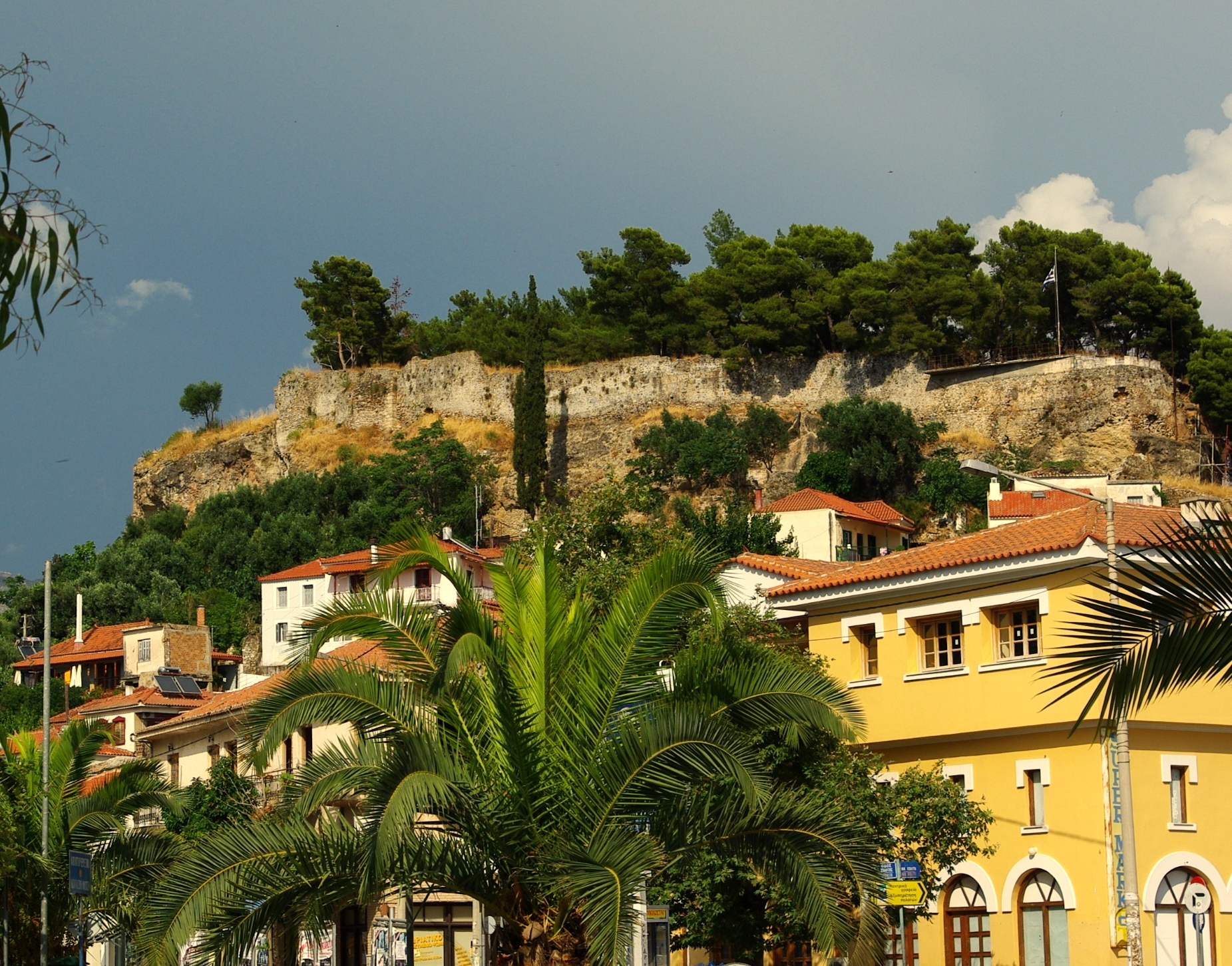
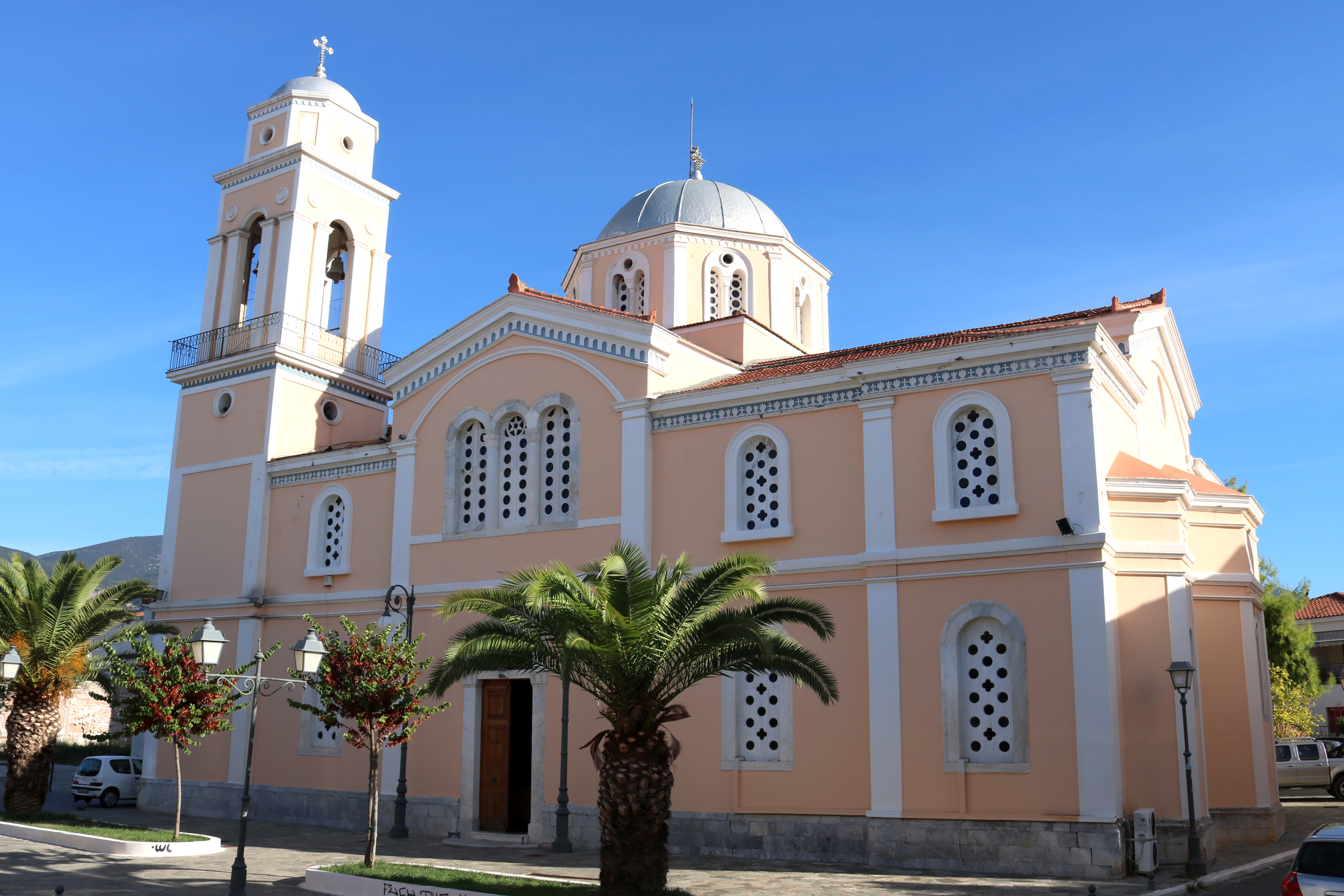
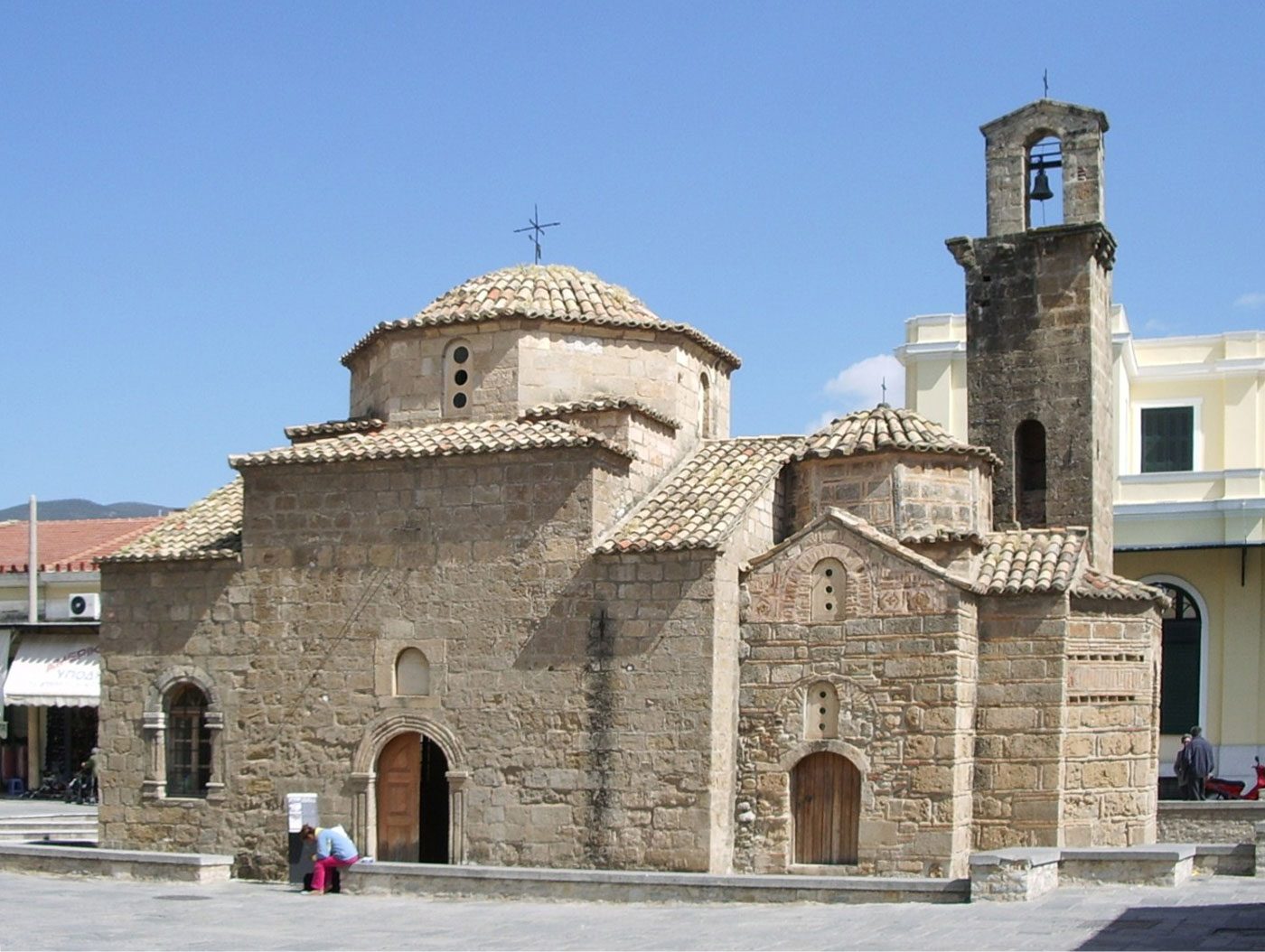
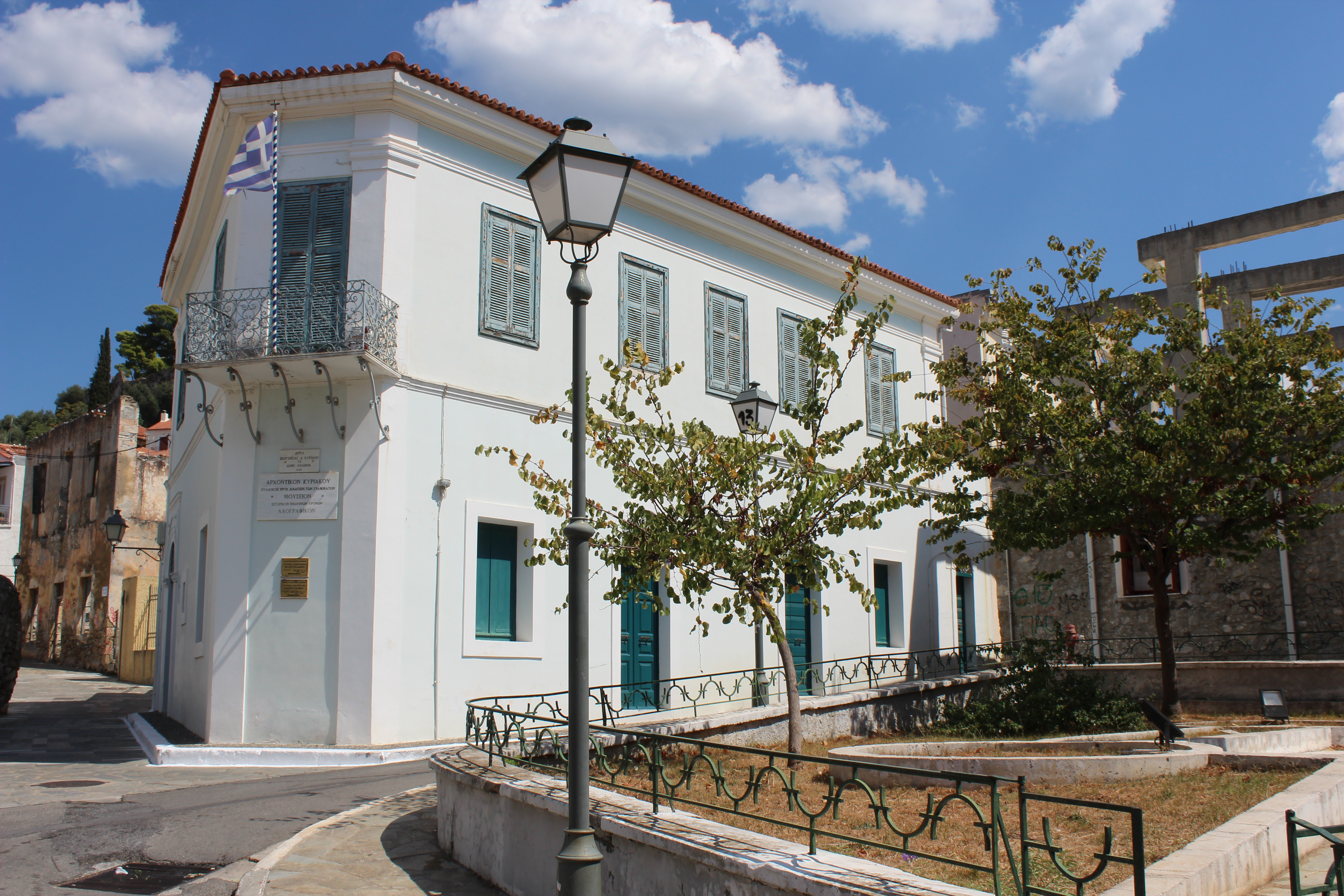
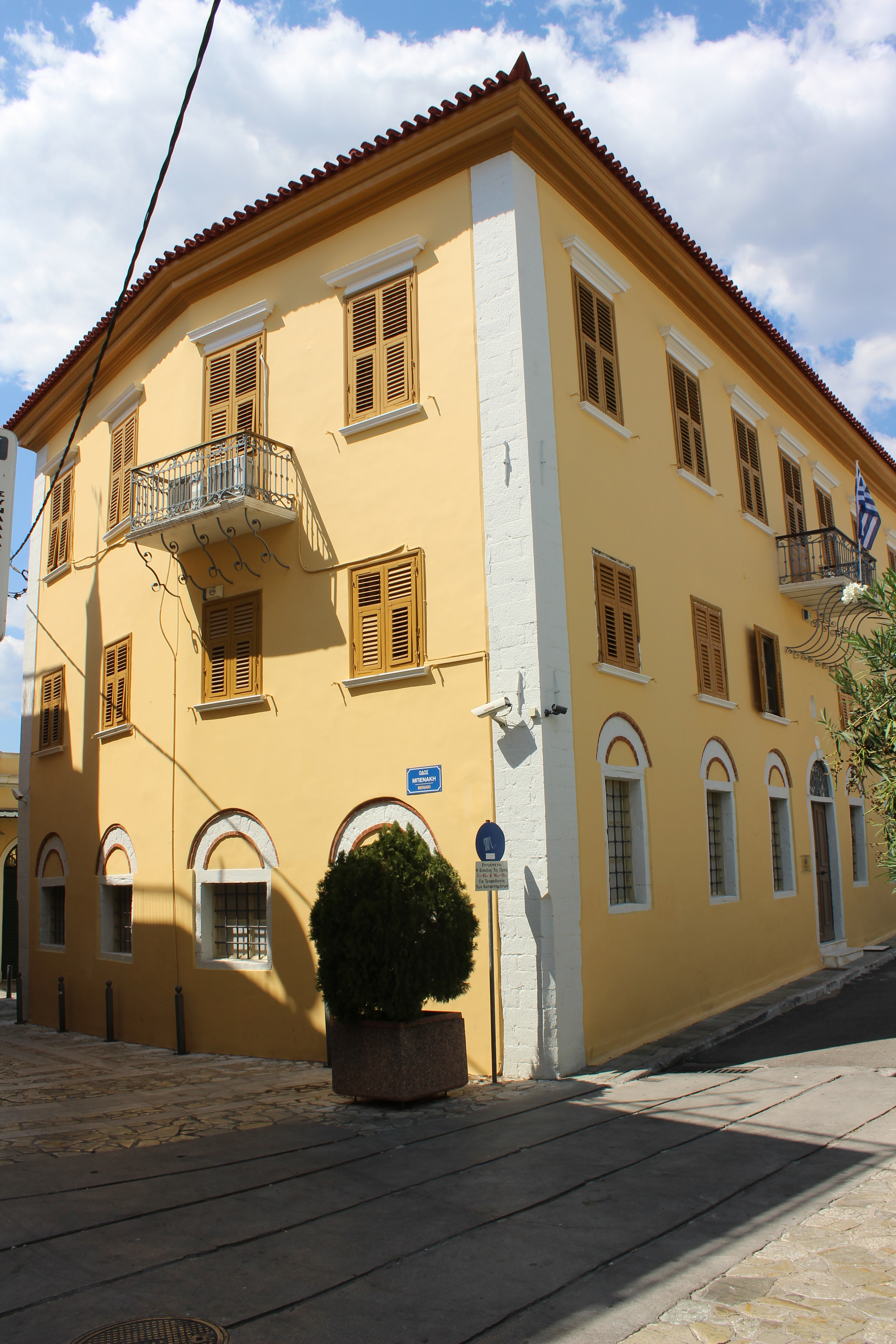
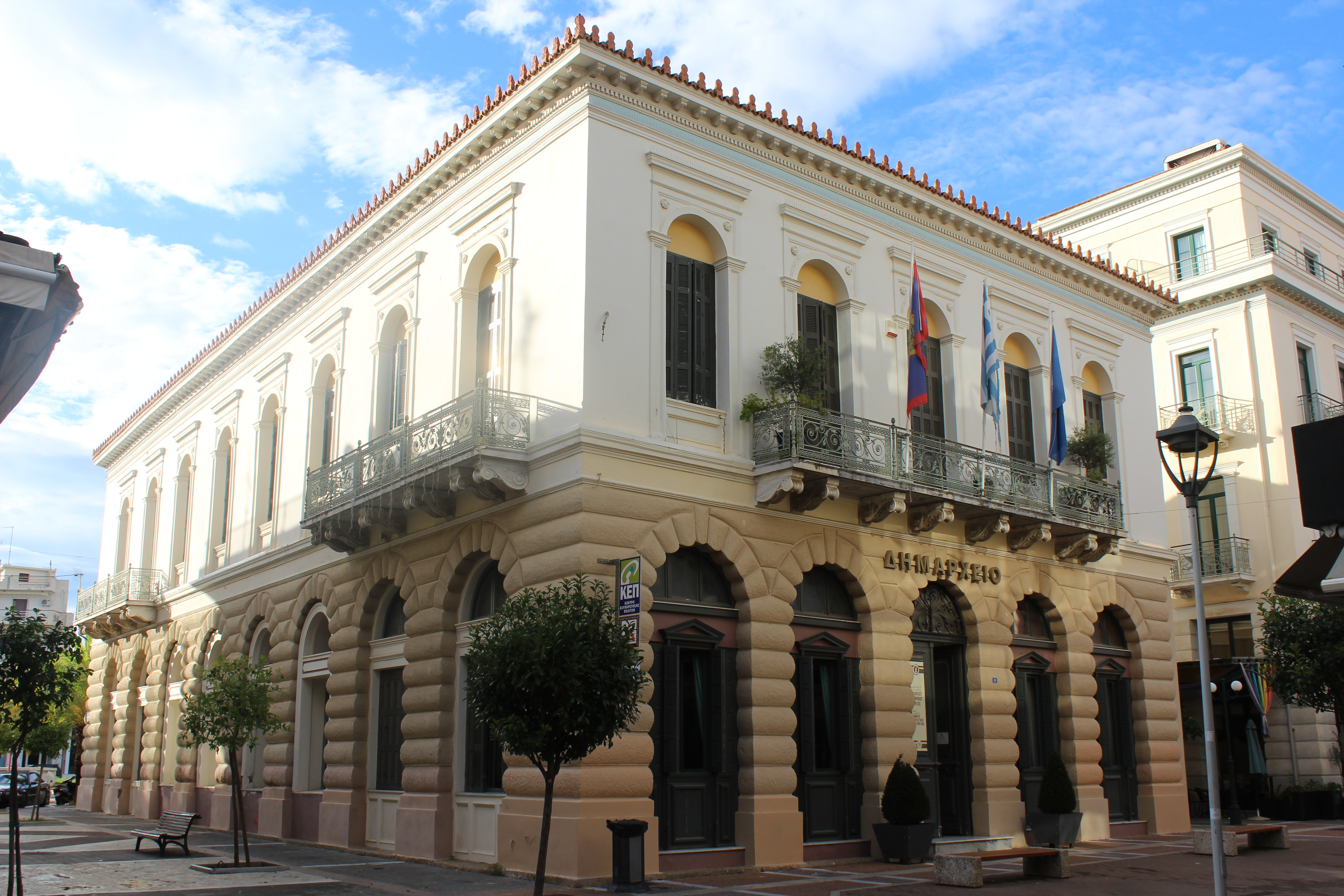
- Clockwise from top right: Promenade of Kalamata, Saint John Church, Kyriakou Folklore Museum, Kalamata City Hall, Archaeological Museum of Messenia, Church of the Holy Apostles, Kalamata Castle

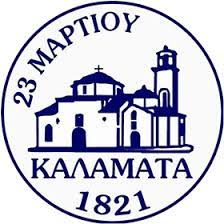
- Seal

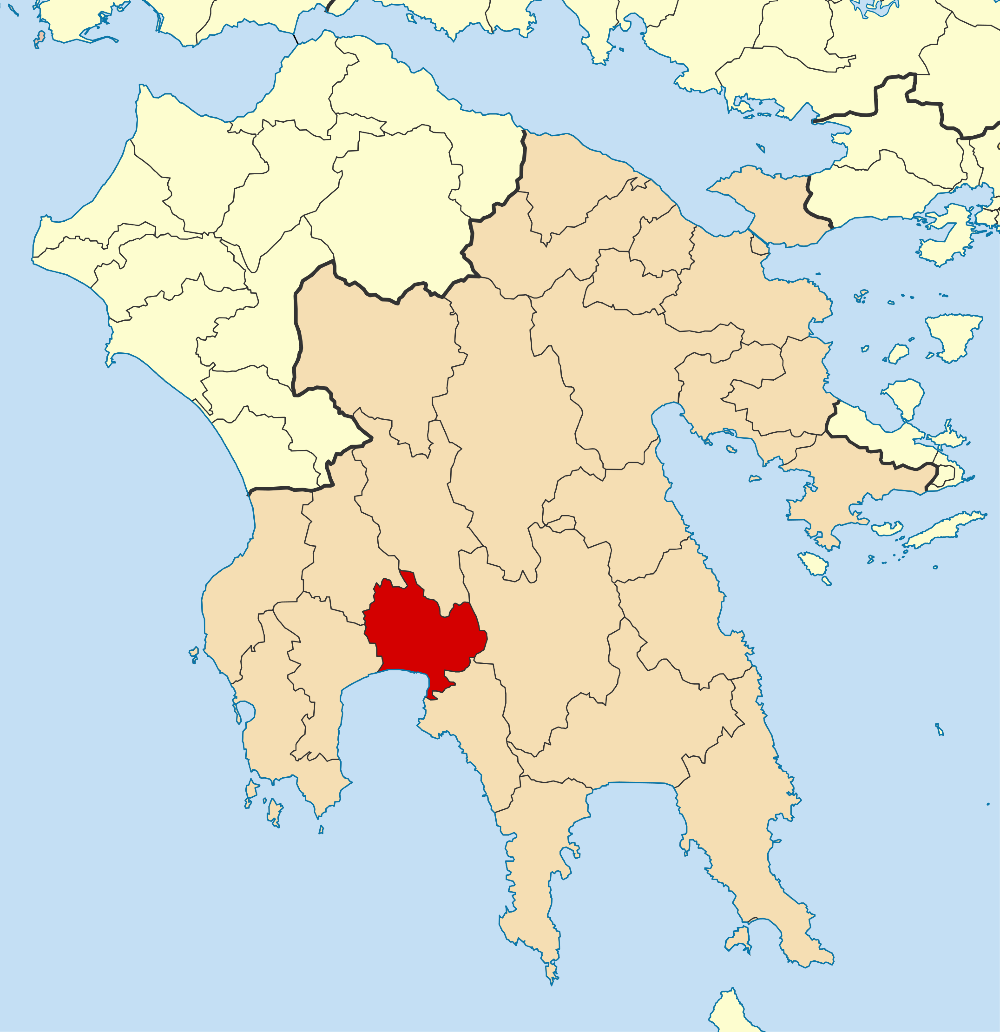

- Location within Greece
- Coordinates: 37°02′16″N 22°06′40″E
- Country: Greece
- Administrative region: Peloponnese
- Regional unit: Messenia

Government
  - Mayor: Athanasios Vasilopoulos (since 2019)

Area
  - Municipality: 440.3 km^{2} (170.0 sq mi)
  - Municipal unit: 253.3 km^{2} (97.8 sq mi)
- Highest elevation: 21 m (69 ft)
- Lowest elevation: 0 m (0 ft)

Population (2021)
  - Municipality: 72,906
  - Density: 165.6/km^{2} (428.9/sq mi)
  - Municipal unit: 66,135
  - Municipal unit density: 261.1/km^{2} (676.2/sq mi)
  - Community: 58,816
- Time zone: UTC+2 (EET)
  - Summer (DST): UTC+3 (EEST)
- Postal code: 241 00
- Area code: 27210
- Vehicle registration: KM
- Website: www.kalamata.gr

Kalamata (Greek: Καλαμάτα [kalaˈmata]) is the second most populous city of the Peloponnese peninsula in southern Greece after Patras, and the largest city of the homonymous administrative region. As the capital and chief port of the Messenia regional unit, it lies along the Nedon River at the head of the Messenian Gulf.

The 2021 census recorded 72,906 inhabitants for the wider Kalamata Municipality, of which 66,135 resided in the municipal unit of Kalamata, and 58,816 in the city proper. Kalamata is renowned as the land of the Kalamatianos dance, Kalamata olives and Kalamata olive oil.

== Name ==
The modern name Kalamáta likely comes from Παναγία η Καλαμάτα, Panagía i Kalamáta, 'Virgin Mary with beautiful eyes'; another hypothesis is a corruption of the older name Καλάμαι, Kalámai, 'reeds'.

== Administration ==
The municipality Kalamata was formed as part of the 2011 local government reform by the merger of the following four former municipalities, each of which subsequently became municipal units:

- Arfara
- Aris
- Kalamata
- Thouria

The municipality has an area of 440 km^{2} (170 mi^{2}), the area of the municipal unit is 253 km^{2} (98 mi^{2}).

=== Subdivisions ===
The municipal unit of Kalamata is subdivided into the following communities (population according to the 2021 census, settlements within the community listed):

Municipal Unit:

- Kalamata (population: 66,135)

Local communities:

- Kalamata city proper (population 58,816)
- Alagonia (population: 154; Alagonia, Machalas)
- Antikalamos (population: 390; Antikalamos, Goulismata)
- Artemisia (population: 88; Agios Ioannis Theologos, Artemisia, Theotokos)
- Asprochoma (population: 1,244; Akovitika, Asprochoma, Kagkareika, Kalami, Katsikovo, Lagkada-Dimitrakopouleika)
- Verga (population: 2,125; Paralia Vergas, Ano Verga, Kato Verga )
- Elaiochori (population: 243; Arachova, Dendra, Diasella, Elaiochori, Moni Dimiovis, Perivolakia)
- Karveli (population: 74; Agia Triada, Emialoi, Karveli, Kato Karveli)
- Ladas (population: 102; Agia Marina, Agios Vasileios, Ladas, Silimpoves-Agios Vasilis)
- Laiika (population: 1,449; Laiika, Katsaraiika, Spitakia, Xerokampi)
- Mikri Mantineia (population: 615; Alimoneika, Mikra Mantineia, Zouzouleika)
- Nedousa (population: 86)
- Piges (population: 71; Piges, Skourolakkos)
- Sperchogeia (population: 678)

=== Province ===
The province of Kalamata (Greek: Επαρχία Καλαμών) was one of the provinces of the Messenia Prefecture. Its territory corresponded with that of the current municipalities Kalamata and West Mani. It was abolished in 2006.

== History ==
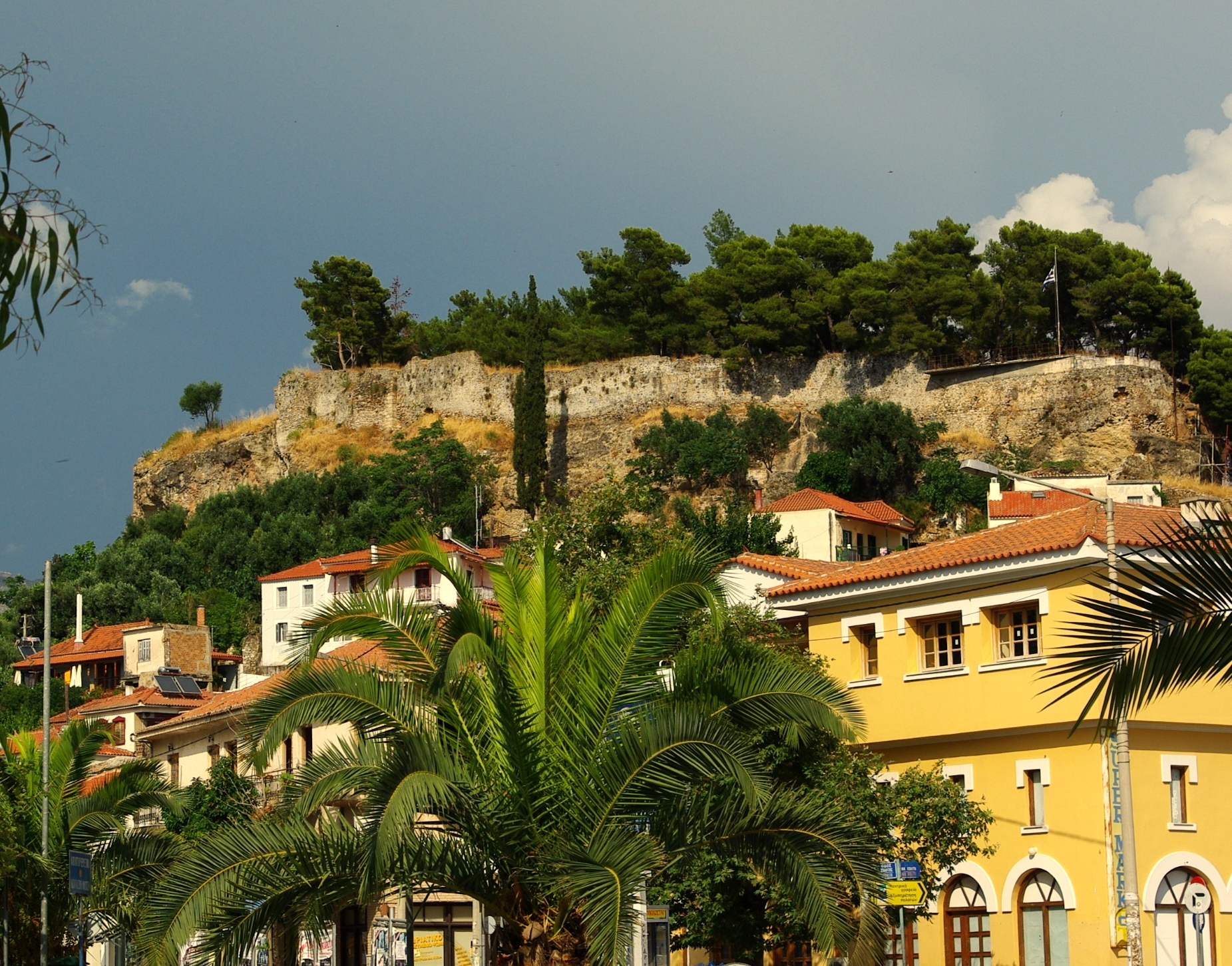
View of the Kalamata Castle

Kalamata occupies the site of an ancient city, the identity of which has been disputed. The name clearly refers to ancient Calamae, but it has been established in the 20th century that the actual site is that of ancient Pharae, a city already mentioned by Homer. It was long believed that the area that the city presently occupies was covered by the sea during ancient times, but the proto-Greek and Archaic-period remains (Temple of Poseidon) that were unearthed at Akovitika region prove otherwise.

=== Middle Ages ===
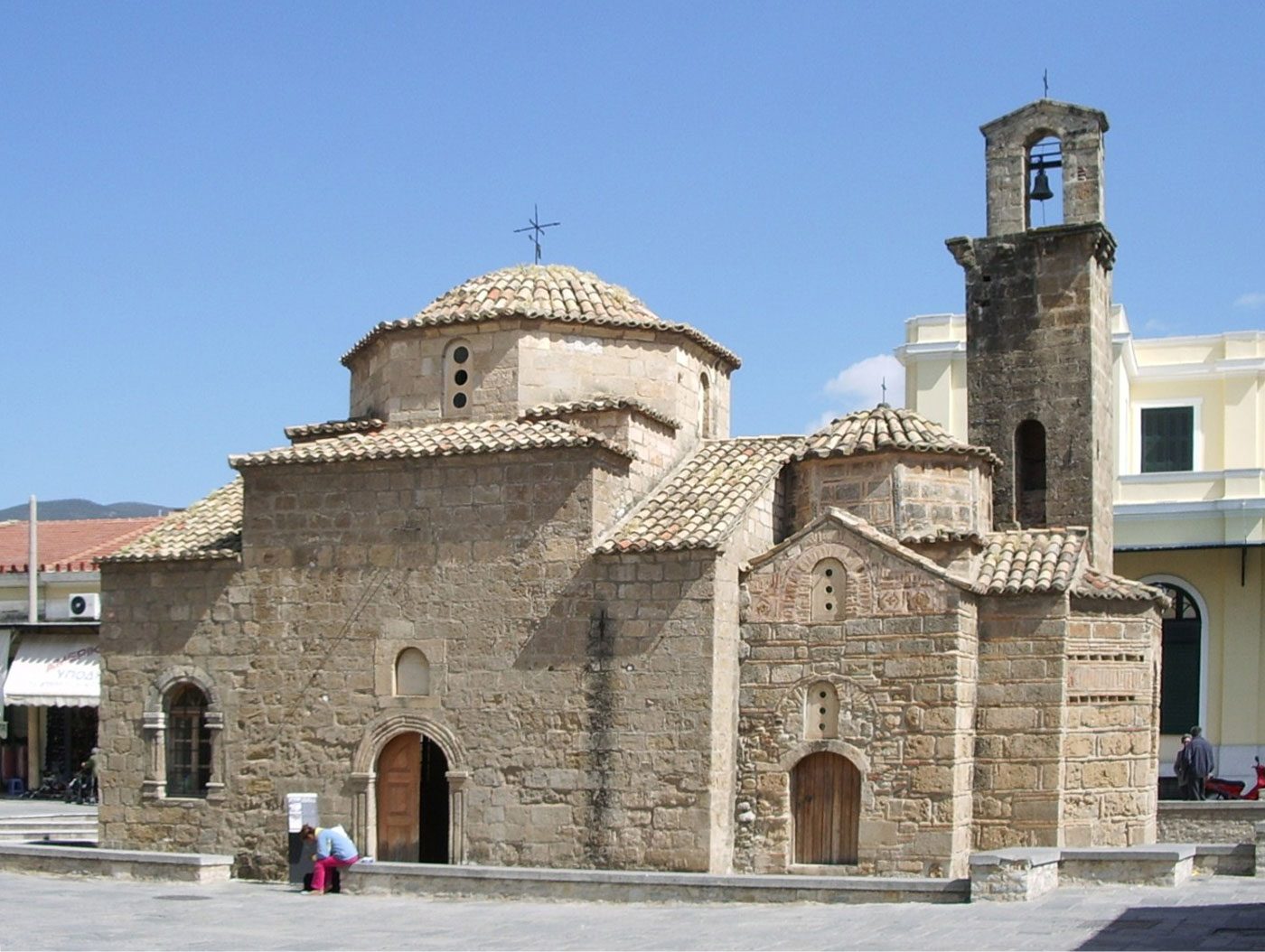
The Byzantine-era Church of the Holy Apostles

Pharae was rather unimportant in antiquity, and the site continued in obscurity until middle Byzantine times. Kalamata is first mentioned in the 10th-century Life of St. Nikon the Metanoeite with its modern name. Medieval Kalamata was not a port, as the local coast offered no shelter to ships from the weather, but lay further inland, at the foot of the western outliers of Mount Taygetos. As the capital of the fertile Messenian plain, the town experienced a period of prosperity in the 11th–12th centuries, as attested by the five surviving churches built in this period, including the Church of the Holy Apostles, as well as the comments of the Arab geographer al-Idrisi, who calls it a "large and populous" town.

Following the Fourth Crusade, Kalamata was conquered by Frankish feudal lords William of Champlitte and Geoffrey of Villehardouin in 1205, when its Byzantine fortress was apparently in so bad a state that it could not be defended against them. Thus, the town became part of the Principality of Achaea, and after Champlitte granted its possession to Geoffrey of Villehardouin, the town was the center of the Villehardouins' patrimony in the Principality. Prince William II of Villehardouin was born and died there. After William II's death in 1278, Kalamata remained in the hands of his widow, Anna Komnene Doukaina, but when she remarried to Nicholas II of Saint Omer, King Charles of Anjou was loath to see this important castle in the hands of a vassal, and in 1282 Anna exchanged it with lands elsewhere in Messenia.

In 1292 or 1293, two local Melingoi Slavic captains managed to capture the castle of Kalamata by a ruse and, aided by 600 of their fellow villagers, took over the entire lower town as well in the name of the Byzantine emperor, Andronikos II Palaiologos. Constable John Chauderon in vain tried to secure their surrender, and was sent to Constantinople, where Andronikos agreed to hand the town over, but then immediately ordered his governor in Mystras not to do so. In the event, the town was recovered by the Franks through the intercession of a local Greek, a certain Sgouromalles. In 1298, the town formed the dowry of Princess Matilda of Hainaut upon her marriage to Guy II de la Roche. Matilda retained Kalamata as her fief until 1322, when she was dispossessed and the territory reverted to the princely domain. In 1358, Prince Robert gifted the châtellenie of Kalamata (comprising also Port-de-Jonc and Mani) to his wife, Marie de Bourbon, who kept it until her death in 1377. The town remained one of the largest in the Morea—a 1391 document places it, with 300 hearths, on par with Glarentza—but it nevertheless declined in importance throughout the 14th and 15th centuries in favour of other nearby sites like Androusa. Kalamata remained in Frankish hands until near the end of the Principality of Achaea, coming under the control of the Byzantine Despotate of the Morea only in 1428.

=== Ottoman period and War of Independence ===
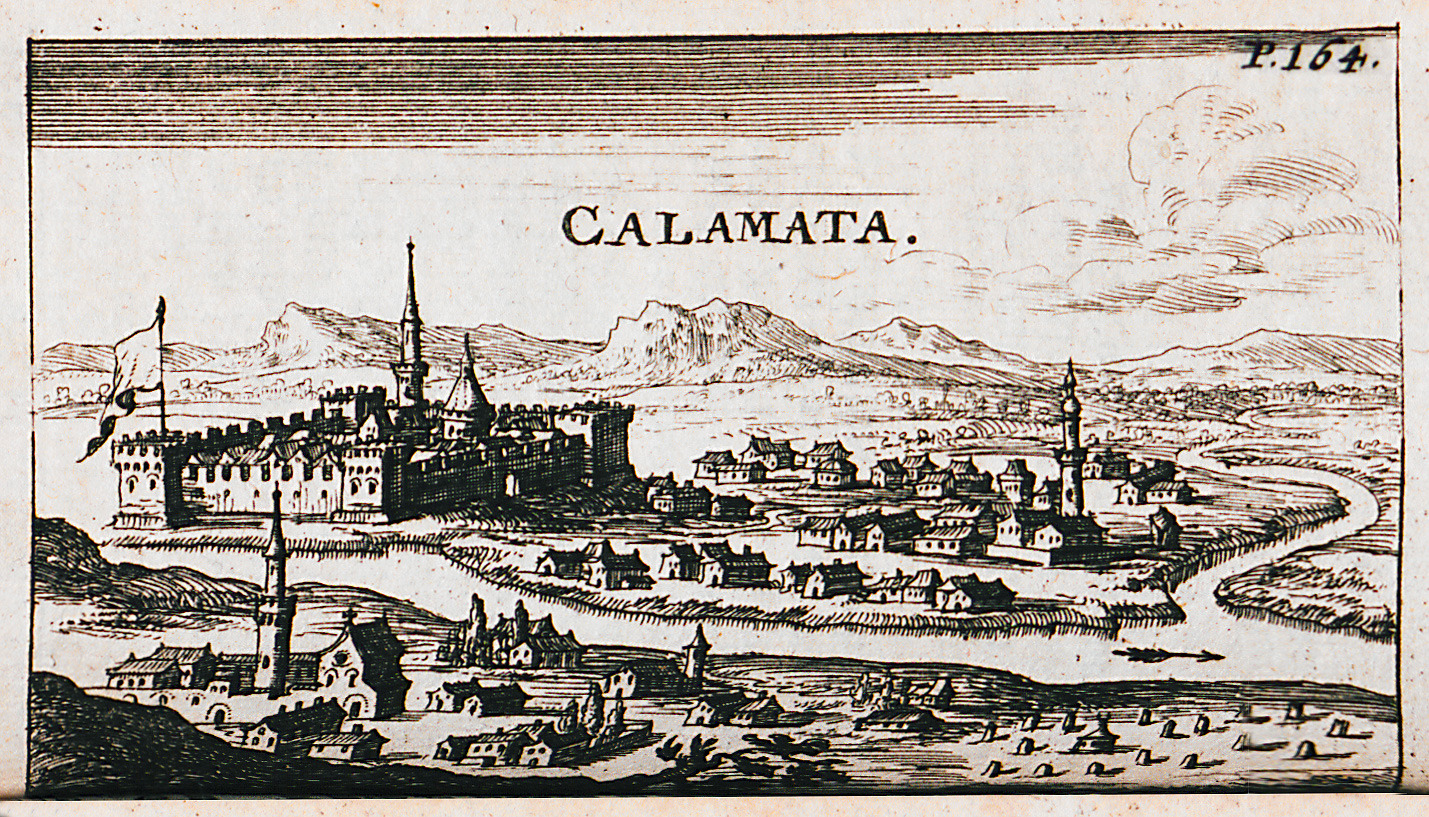
Engraving of Kalamata, 1686

Kalamata was occupied by the Ottomans in 1481. In 1659, during the long war between Ottomans and Venetians over Crete, the Venetian commander Francesco Morosini, captured Kalamata in an effort to divert Ottoman attention from the Siege of Candia, and raise a wider revolt. The Venetian fleet took Kalamata without effort, as the Ottomans abandoned the town. The town and its castle were plundered and destroyed, and all able-bodied men were carried off to serve as rowers in the Venetian galleys. Morosini returned in 1685, at the start of the Morean War: on 14 September 1685 the Venetians defeated an Ottoman army before Kalamata, and again plundered and destroyed the town's castle, as it was judged obsolete. Kalamata was then ruled by Venice as part of the "Kingdom of the Morea" (Italian: Regno di Morea). During the Venetian occupation the city was developed and thrived economically. However, the Ottomans reoccupied Kalamata in the war of 1715 and controlled it until the Greek War of Independence.

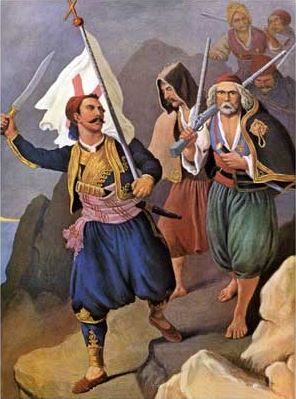
Petros Mavromichalis raises Messenia in revolt, by Peter von Hess

Kalamata was the first city to be liberated as the Greeks rose in the Greek War of Independence. On 23 March 1821, it was taken over by the Greek revolutionary forces under the command of generals Theodoros Kolokotronis, Petros Mavromichalis and Papaflessas. However, in 1825, the invading Ottoman officer Ibrahim Pasha destroyed the city.

=== Modern period ===
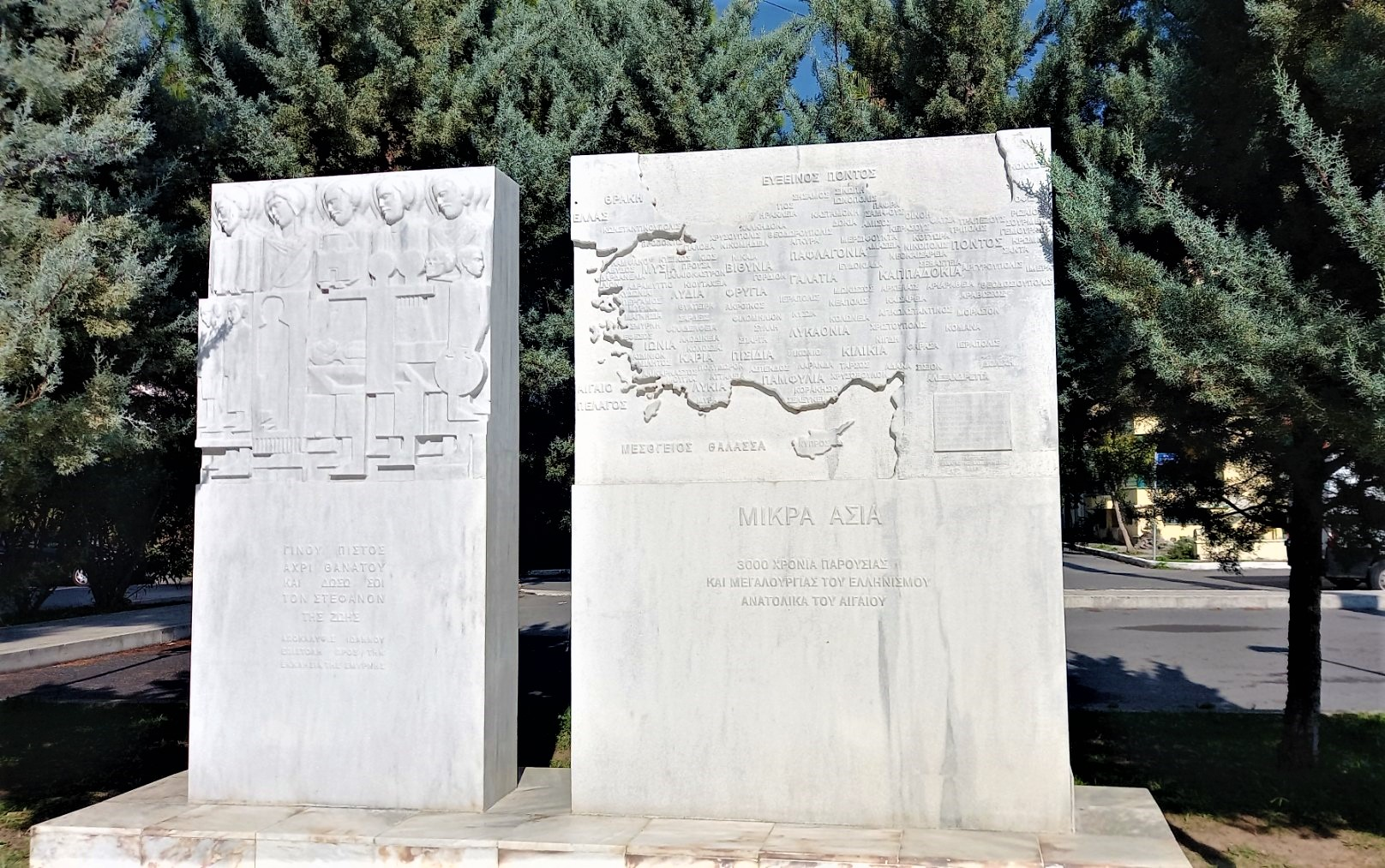
Monument to Greek Asia Minor

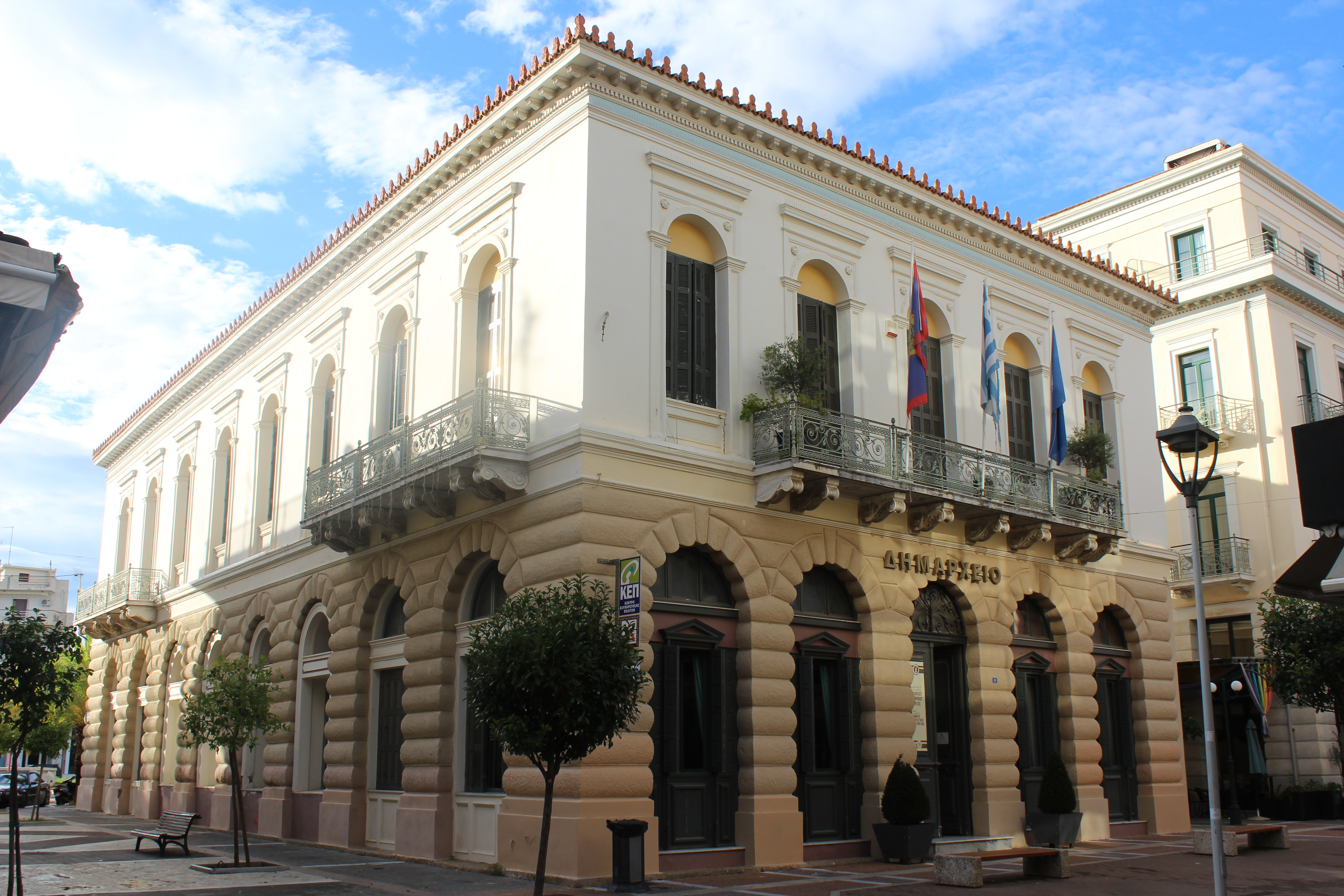
The city hall

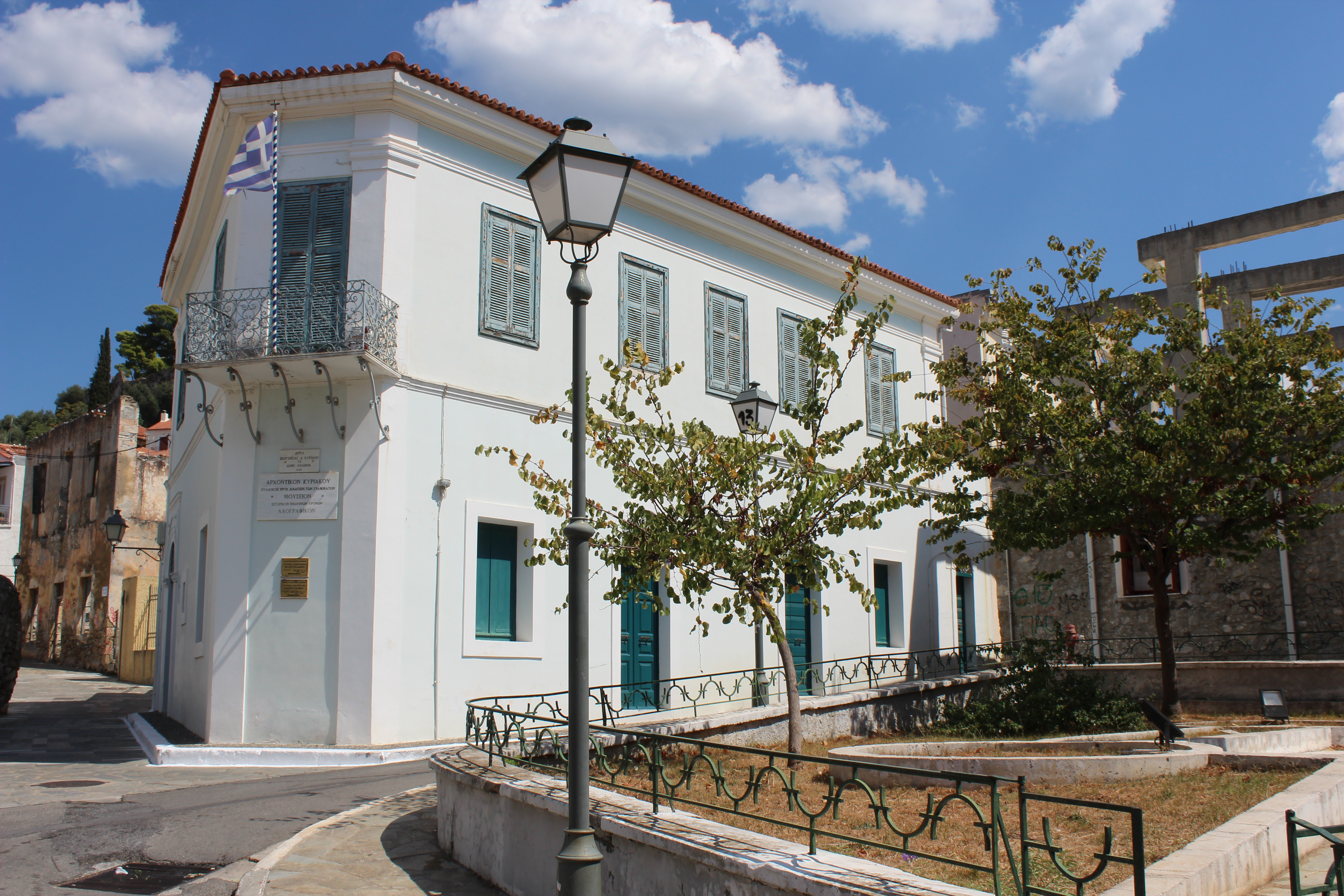
Folklore museum (Kyriakou mansion)

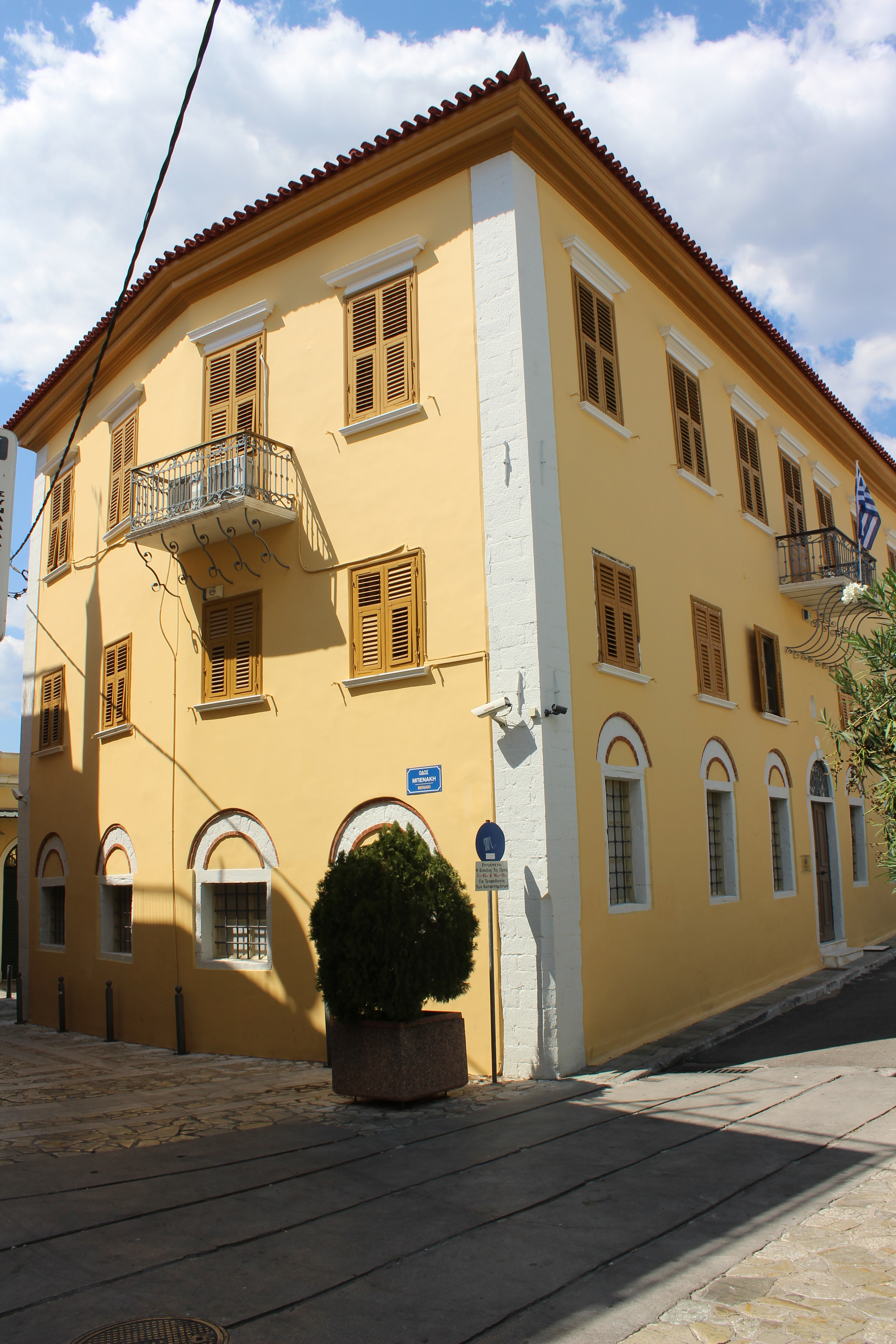
The archaeological museum

In independent Greece, Kalamata was rebuilt and became one of the most important ports in the Mediterranean Sea. It is not surprising that the second-oldest Chamber of Commerce in the Mediterranean, after that of Marseille, exists in Kalamata. In 1934, a large strike of harbor workers occurred in Kalamata. The strike was violently suppressed by the government, resulting in the death of five workers and two other residents of the town.

During World War II on 29 April 1941, a battle was fought near the port between the invading German forces and the 2nd New Zealand Division, for which Jack Hinton was later awarded the Victoria Cross. Kalamata was liberated on 9 September 1944, after a battle between ELAS and the local Nazi collaborators.

Kalamata was again in the news on 13 September 1986, when it was hit by an earthquake that measured 6.2 on the surface wave magnitude scale. It was described as "moderately strong" but caused heavy damage throughout the city, killed 20 people and injured 330 others.

Kalamata has developed into a modern provincial capital and has returned to growth in recent years. Today, Kalamata has the second largest population and mercantile activity in Peloponnese. It makes important exports, particularly of local products such as raisins, olives and olive oil. It is also the seat of the Metropolitan Bishop of Messenia. The current Metropolitan Bishop is Chrysostomus III of Kalamata, since 15 March 2007.

== Sights ==
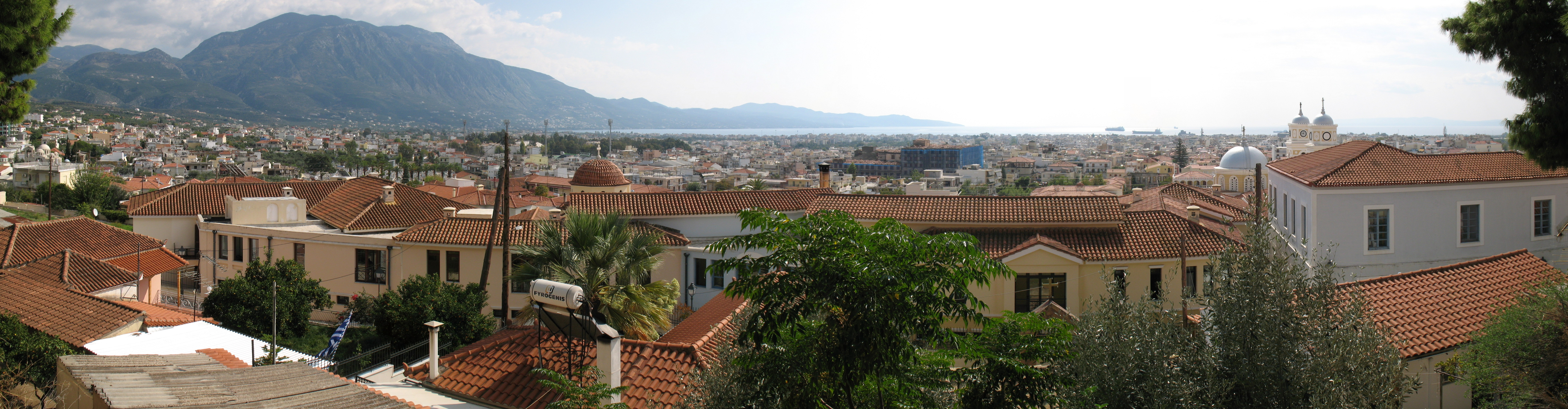
View from the castle

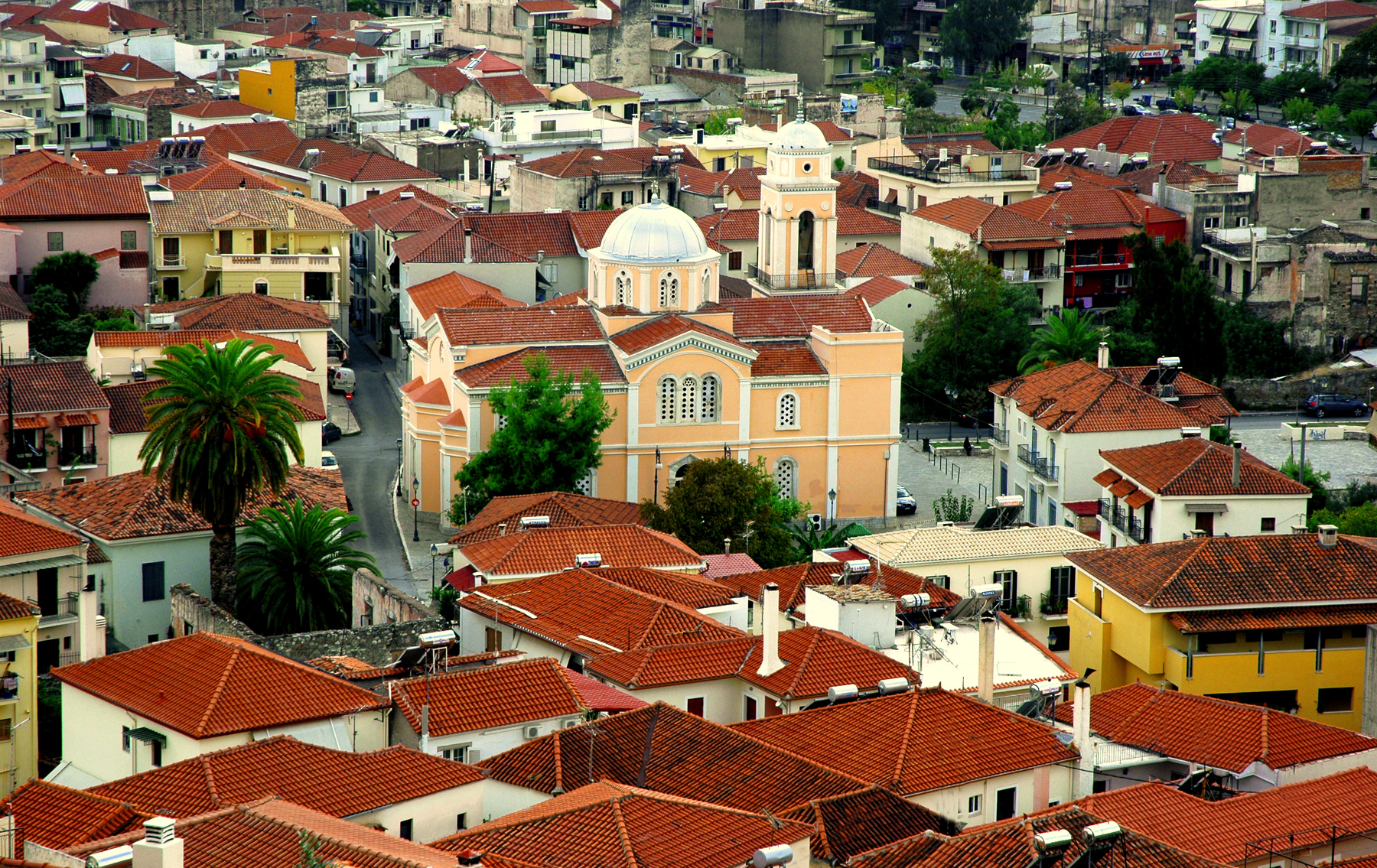
View of the old town

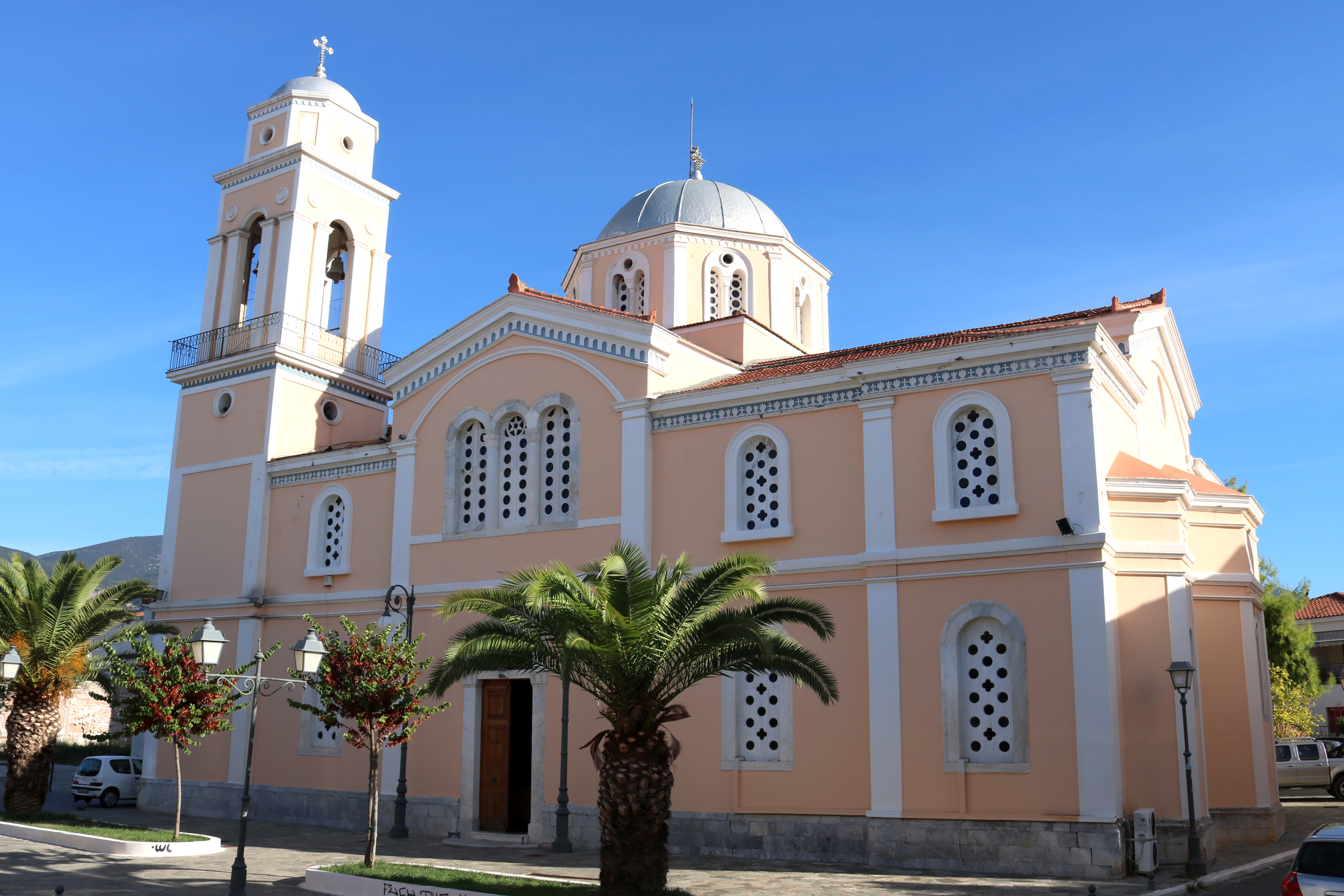
Agios Ioannis (St. John) church

Maria Callas Alumni Association of the Music School of Kalamata / "Maria Callas Museum"

There are numerous historical and cultural sights in Kalamata, such as the Villehardouin castle, the Ypapanti Byzantine church, the Kalograion monastery with its silk-weaving workshop where the Kalamata scarves are made, and the municipal railway park. The Church of the Holy Apostles is where Mavromichalis declared the revolt against Ottoman rule in 1821. Art collections are housed at the Municipal Gallery, the Archaeological Museum of Messenia and the Folk Art Museum.

- Benakeion Archaeological Museum of Kalamata, located in the heart of the historical centre of Kalamata.
- Cultural events, such as the Kalamata International Dance Festival
- The Kalamata Dance Megaron
- Kalamata Drama International Summer School
- Kalamata Castle from the 13th century AD.
- The marina and the Port of Kalamata, located SW of the city centre, is the main and largest port in Messenia and the southern part of the Peloponnese.
- Kalamata Municipal Stadium, home of Messiniakos, seats 5,400 spectators
- The Railway Museum of the Municipality of Kalamata, a railway museum which first opened since 1986
- Ancient Messene, some 15–20 km (9–12 mi) north-west of modern Messini
- The Maria Callas Alumni Association of the Music School of Kalamata (www.mariacallas.gr) with the exhibition of the personal letters of the legendary Maria Callas.

=== Cathedral of Ypapanti ===
Kalamata's cathedral of the Ypapanti (Presentation of the Lord to the Temple) nestles beneath the 14th-century Frankish castle. The foundation stone was laid on 25 January 1860, and the building was consecrated on 19 August 1873. It suffered great damage during the 1986 earthquake, but was subsequently restored. The Festival of the Ypapanti (27 January through 9 February) is of national importance for the Greek Orthodox Church and, locally, the occasion for a holiday (2 February), when the procession of what is believed to be a miraculous icon, first introduced in 1889, takes place.

In late January 2010, the city hosted the Ecumenical Patriarch Bartholomew to celebrate the 150th anniversary of the cathedral. He was offered the golden key of the city. The region around Kalamata has provided two Ecumenical patriarchs in the past.

== Economy ==
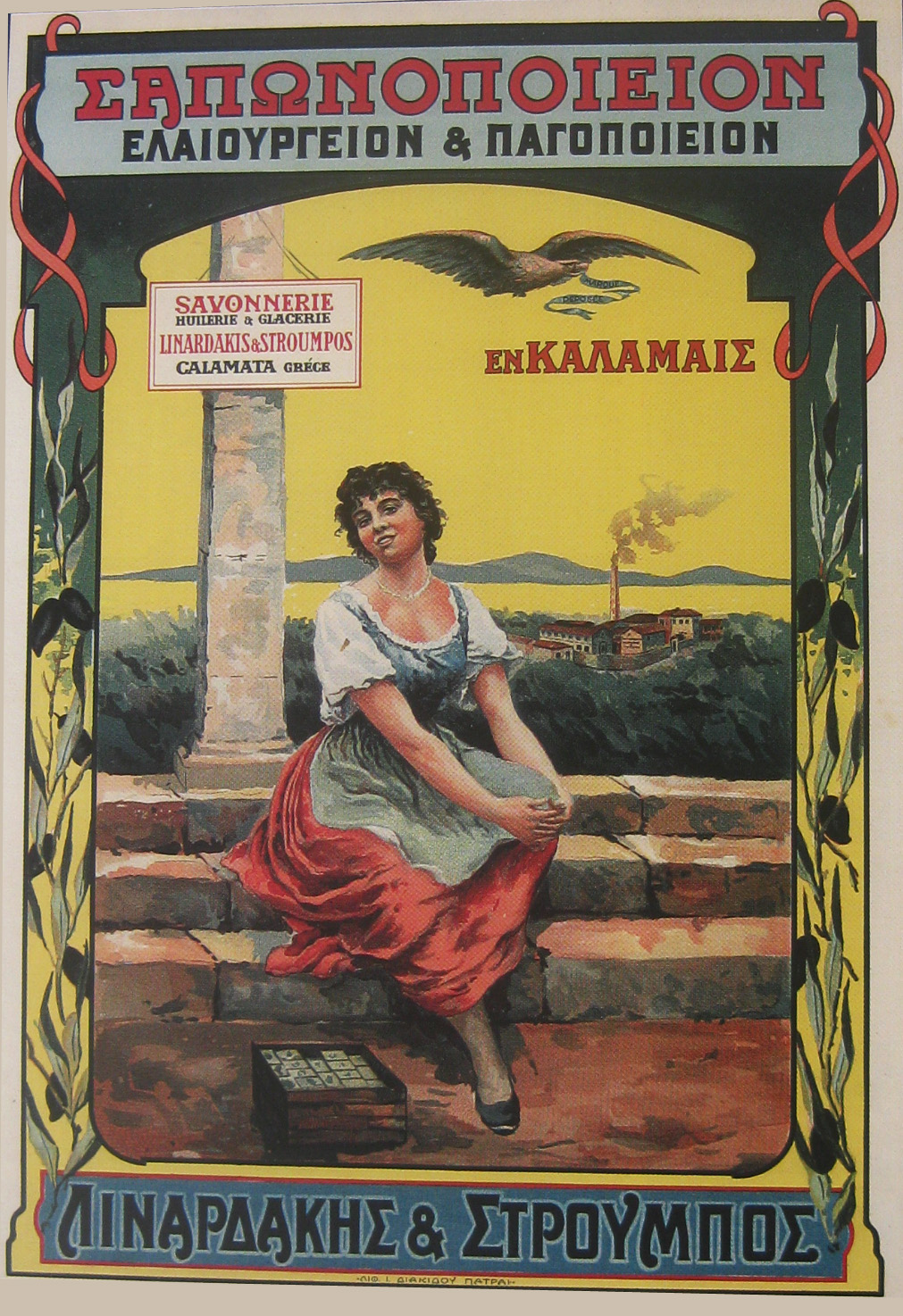
Historic advertising for olive oil soap from Kalamata

Kalamata's Chamber of Commerce is the second-oldest in the Mediterranean after Marseille. Kalamata is well known for its black Kalamata olives.

Karelia Tobacco Company has been in operation in Kalamata since 1888.

== Historical population ==
Year	City	Municipal unit	Municipality
1981	42,075	–	–
1991	43,625	50,693	–
2001	49,550	57,620	–
2011	54,567	62,409	69,849
2021	58,816	66,135	72,906

== Climate ==
According to the meteorological station in the nearby airport, Kalamata has a hot-summer Mediterranean climate (Köppen: Csa) with mild, wet winters and hot, dry summers. Kalamata receives plenty of precipitation during the winter, while summers are hot and generally dry with plenty of sunshine. The highest maximum temperature ever recorded in Kalamata is 45.0 °C or 113.0 °F on 24 June 2007 and the lowest minimum ever recorded is −5 °C or 23 °F on 14 February 2004. A reading of 45.1 °C (113.2 °F) was reported in the city station which is operated by the National Observatory of Athens on 23 July 2023.

Climate data for Kalamata airport, HNMS 1971–2010 normals
Month	Jan	Feb	Mar	Apr	May	Jun	Jul	Aug	Sep	Oct	Nov	Dec	Year
Record high °C (°F)	23.0 (73.4)	26.0 (78.8)	26.0 (78.8)	30.9 (87.6)	39.9 (103.8)	45.0 (113.0)	44.4 (111.9)	43.2 (109.8)	38.9 (102.0)	37.0 (98.6)	29.0 (84.2)	26.0 (78.8)	45.0 (113.0)
Mean daily maximum °C (°F)	14.7 (58.5)	14.9 (58.8)	16.9 (62.4)	19.9 (67.8)	24.6 (76.3)	29.1 (84.4)	31.3 (88.3)	31.4 (88.5)	28.4 (83.1)	24.3 (75.7)	19.6 (67.3)	16.0 (60.8)	22.6 (72.7)
Daily mean °C (°F)	9.8 (49.6)	10.1 (50.2)	12.0 (53.6)	15.0 (59.0)	19.7 (67.5)	24.3 (75.7)	26.5 (79.7)	26.2 (79.2)	22.8 (73.0)	18.5 (65.3)	14.1 (57.4)	11.0 (51.8)	17.5 (63.5)
Mean daily minimum °C (°F)	5.4 (41.7)	5.3 (41.5)	6.4 (43.5)	8.7 (47.7)	12.4 (54.3)	16.0 (60.8)	18.8 (65.8)	18.4 (65.1)	16.0 (60.8)	12.9 (55.2)	9.4 (48.9)	6.7 (44.1)	11.4 (52.5)
Record low °C (°F)	−5.0 (23.0)	−5.0 (23.0)	−3.6 (25.5)	0.0 (32.0)	5.4 (41.7)	9.0 (48.2)	12.0 (53.6)	12.4 (54.3)	9.6 (49.3)	4.2 (39.6)	−0.4 (31.3)	−3.4 (25.9)	−5.0 (23.0)
Average precipitation mm (inches)	105.6 (4.16)	95.0 (3.74)	66.3 (2.61)	51.9 (2.04)	22.8 (0.90)	7.8 (0.31)	6.0 (0.24)	10.9 (0.43)	36.7 (1.44)	85.7 (3.37)	141.7 (5.58)	141.2 (5.56)	780.3 (30.72)
Average precipitation days	14.4	13.7	11.8	10.3	6.8	3.0	1.5	2.4	6.1	9.9	12.8	15.7	108.4
Average relative humidity (%)	75.0	73.5	73.3	70.3	66.3	57.7	57.8	61.3	66.8	72.1	77.6	77.3	70.1
Mean monthly sunshine hours	143.6	140.8	185.9	212.2	286.0	338.2	367.6	346.6	269.9	205.6	150.6	131.1	2,778.1
Source: HNMS climate means, NOAA extremes & sunshine 1961-1990 Info Climat extremes 1991-present

== Transportation ==
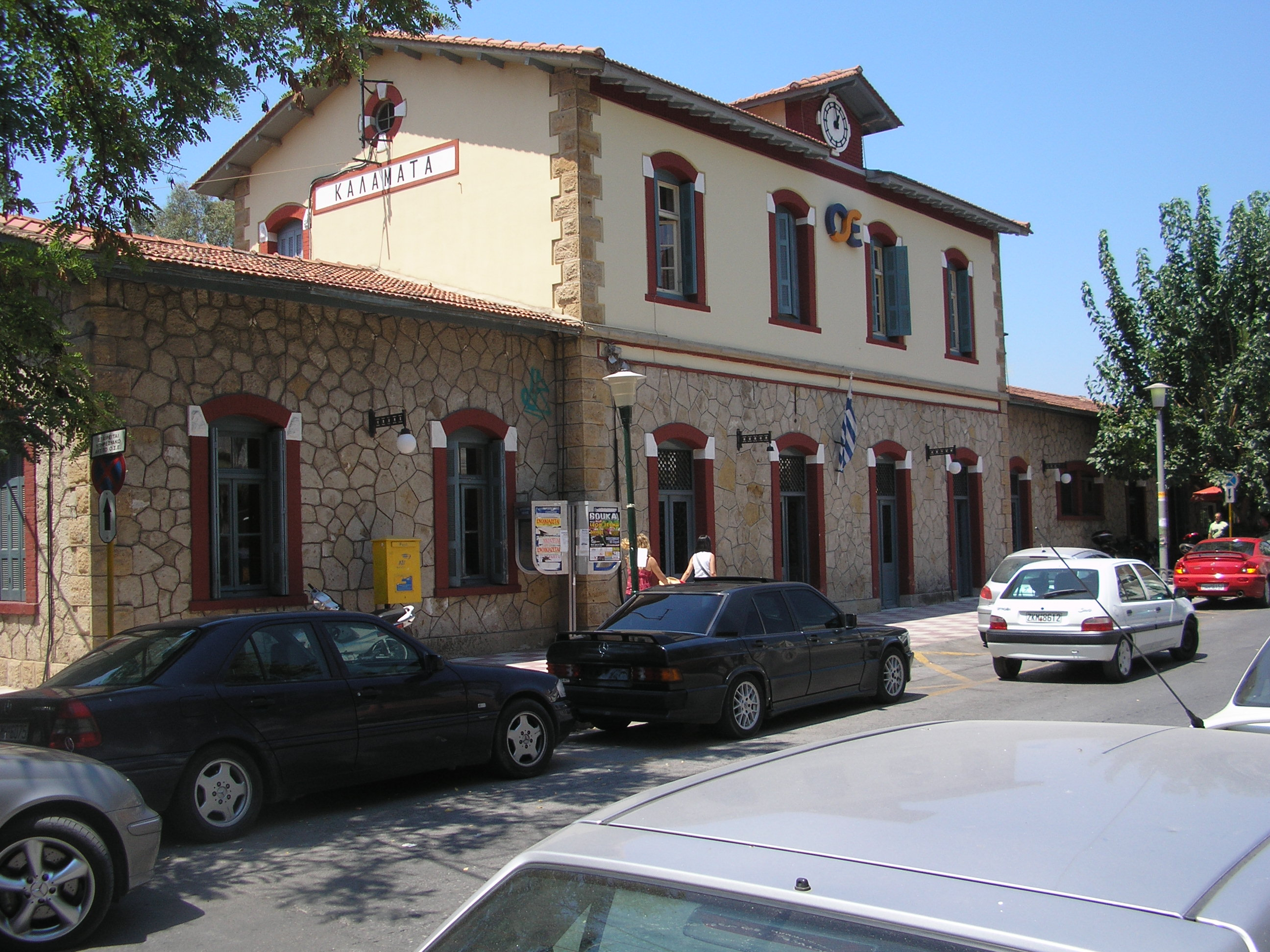
The railway station

Kalamata is accessed by the EO7/E55/E65 roads in the west, and the EO82 road runs through Kalamata and into the Taygetus. The motorway to Kalamata from Tripoli is complete.

Kalamata is served by a metre gauge railway line of the former Piraeus, Athens and Peloponnese Railways, now owned by the Hellenic Railways Organisation (OSE). There is a station and a small freight yard in the city, as well as a rolling stock maintenance depot to the north. There used to be a mainline train service to Kyparissia, Pyrgos and Patras, and a suburban service to Messini and the General Hospital. However, in December 2010, all train services from Kalamata, along with those in the rest of the Peloponnese south of Corinth, were discontinued on economic grounds, and the train station is now closed. A previously disused extension line to the port is now a Railway Park, with old steam engines on display, and a café in the old station building. Since 10 June 2025, there has been an effort in the Kalamata municipal council to restore the Kalamata - Messinia part of the line. The Municipal government wishes for the line to connect the port of Kalamata, Kalamata International Airport, the Courts and finally Messinia. The vice-mayor supported the plan and wished to install traffic lights should construction be implemented finishing to say that by the end of 2025 3km of the line will have been completed. The local KKE-backed Councillor claimed that the shutting down of the train tracks is one of the most destructive decisions made.

There is a bus link, operated by the KTEL company, to Tripoli, Corinth, and Athens, with frequent services. Ferries are available to places such as the Greek islands of Kythira and Crete in the summer months. Also in the summer months, charter and scheduled flights fly direct to Kalamata International Airport from some European cities. A scheduled service by Aegean Airlines once a day linking Kalamata and Athens International Airport commenced in 2010.

Kalamata also has four urban bus lines that cross the city and its suburbs.

== Cuisine ==
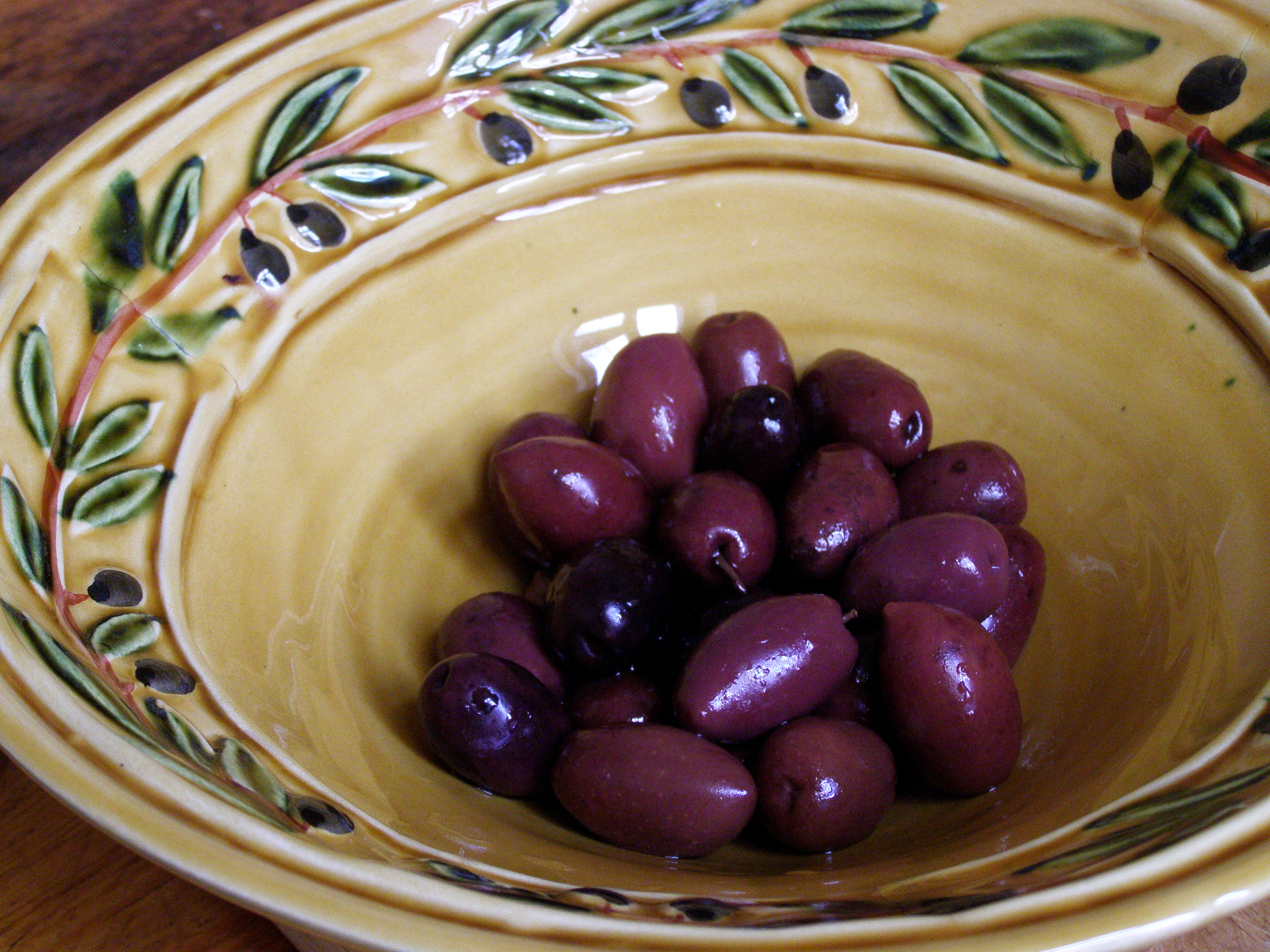
A plate with black Kalamata olives

Local specialities:

- Kalamata olives
- Lalagia (Λαλάγγια/Λαλαγγίδες)
- Diples (dessert)
- Pasteli (dessert)
- Talagani cheese
- Sfela cheese

== Notable people ==
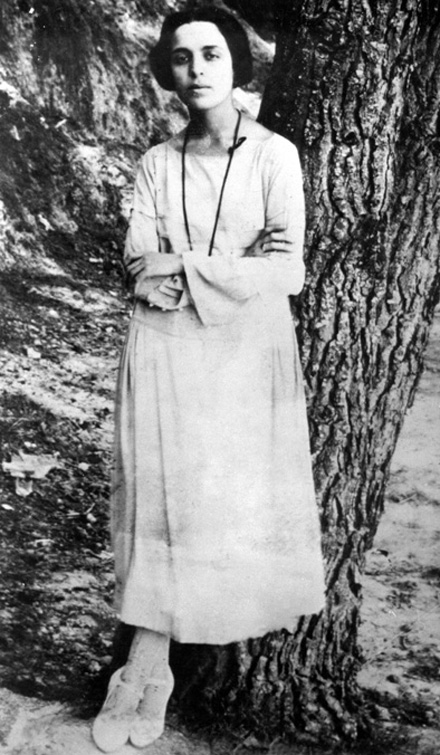
Maria Polydouri

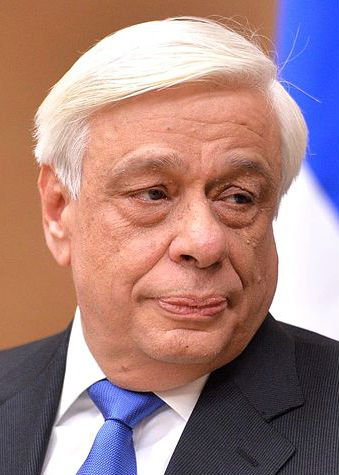
Prokopis Pavlopoulos, former President of Greece

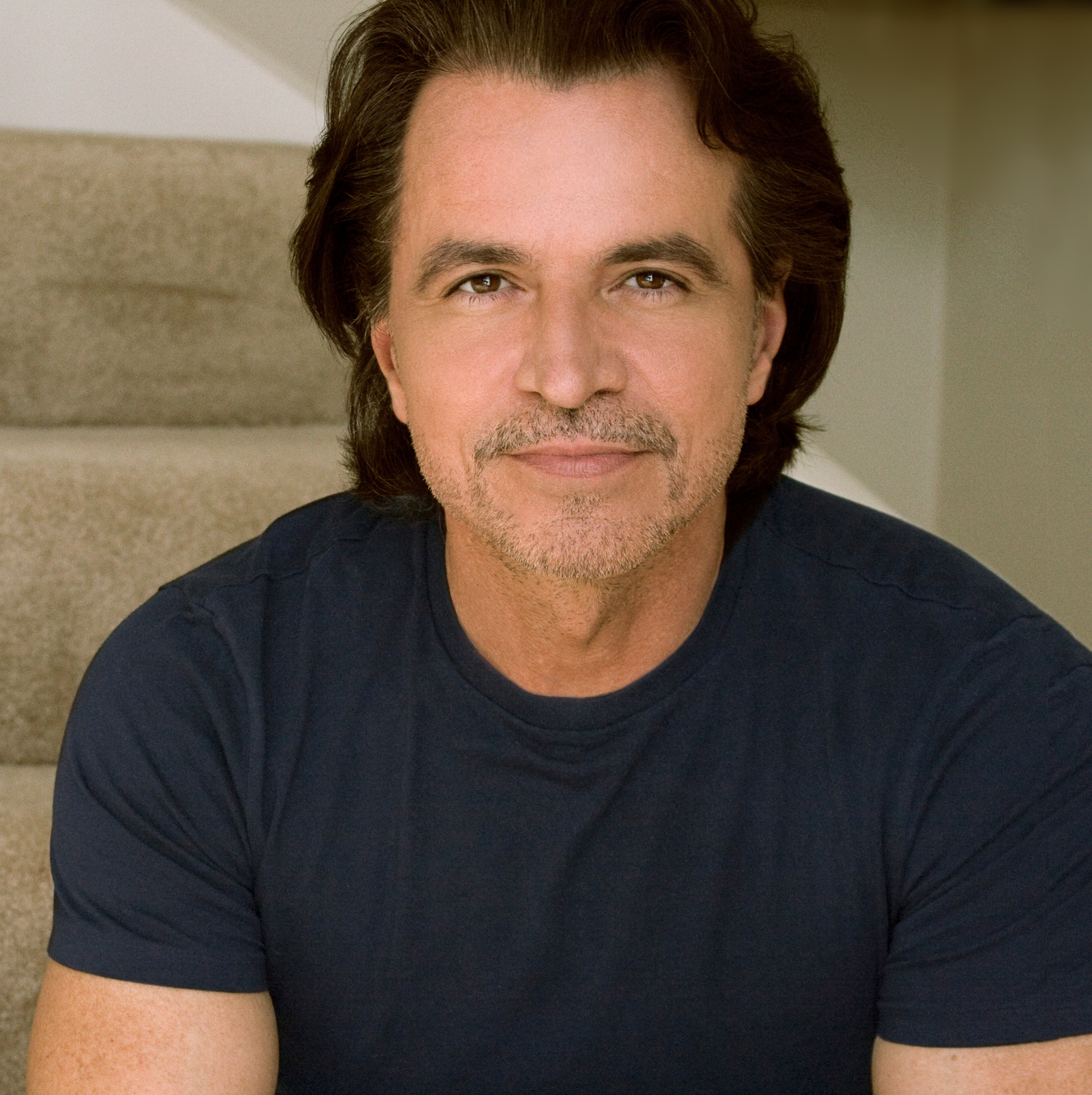
Yanni

- Andreas Apostolopoulos (born 1952), real estate developer and sports team owner
- John Barounis, Greek Australian politician
- Giannis Christopoulos (born 1972), football coach
- Yiannis Chryssomallis ("Yanni") (born 1954), composer and musician
- Vassilis C. Constantakopoulos (1935–2011), shipowner
- Aggeliki Daliani (born 1979) actress
- Nikolaos Doxaras, painter
- Panagiotis Doxaras, painter
- Lawrence Durrell (1912–1990), writer
- Nikolaos Georgeas (born 1976), footballer
- Alexandros Koumoundouros, Prime Minister of Greece in the 19th century
- Elia Markopoulos, American professional wrestler who spent his childhood summers at his family's home in Kalamata.
- Gerasimos Michaleas (1945), American Eastern Orthodox bishop
- Panos Mihalopoulos (born 1949), actor
- Nikos Moulatsiotis, footballer and coach
- Sokratis Papastathopoulos (born 1988), footballer
- Prokopis Pavlopoulos (born 1950) lawyer, university professor, politician, former President of Greece from 2015 to 2020
- Vassilis Photopoulos (1934–2007) painter, film director, art director and set designer
- Nikolaos Politis (1872–1942), diplomat, lawyer
- Maria Polydouri (1902–1930), poet
- Aris San (born Aristides Saisanas, 1940–1992), Greek-Israeli singer
- Angelos Skafidas, footballer and coach
- Kenny Stamatopoulos (born 1979), footballer
- Michail Stasinopoulos (1903–2002) lawyer, President of the Republic of Greece
- Gregory Stephanopoulos (born 1950) Professor of Chemical Engineering, MIT
- William II of Villehardouin (died 1278) the last Villehardouin prince of Achaea
- Mihalis Papagiannakis (1941–2009), Greek politician
- Panagiotis Benakis (1700–1771), Greek notable
- Stavros Kostopoulos (1900–1968), Greek banker and politician
- Dimitrios Stefanakos (1936–2021), Greek footballer
- Konstantinos Ventiris (1892–1960), Greek army officer
- Panagiotis Bachramis (1976–2010), Greek footballer
- Nikos Economopoulos (born 1953), Greek photographer
- Bleepsgr, Greek street artist

== Sporting teams ==
Kalamata hosts a lot of notable sport clubs with earlier presence in the higher national divisions in Greek football. It also hosts one of the oldest Greek club, the club Messiniakos FC founded in 1888.

Sport clubs based in Kalamata
Club	Founded	Sports	Achievements
Messiniakos GS	1888	Football, Volleyball	Earlier presence in Beta Ethniki football, earlier presence in A1 Ethniki volleyball
A.E.K. Kalamata	1926	Football	Earlier presence in Beta Ethniki
Apollon Kalamata	1927	Football	Earlier presence in Beta Ethniki
Prasina Poulia Kalamata	1938	Football	Earlier presence in Beta Ethniki
Kalamata F.C.	1967	Football	Earlier presence in A Ethniki
AO Kalamata 1980	1980	Basketball, Volleyball	Presence in A2 Ethniki volleyball
Argis Kalamata	1994	Athletics	

== International relations ==
=== Twin towns—sister cities ===
Kalamata is twinned with:

- Aglantzia, Cyprus.
- Amioun, Lebanon.
- Lowell, Massachusetts, United States
- Xi'an, China

== See also ==
- List of cities and towns in Greece
