= Kalamai =

Kalamai may refer to:

- kalamai (dessert), a coconut pudding from the Mariana islands
- an older name for Kalamata, a city in southern Greece
- Kalamai (Messenia), a town of ancient Messenia, Greece
- Kalamai, Uganda, a village in Teso sub-region, Uganda
