= Kalamata dock workers' strike =

The Kalamata dock workers' strike (Greek: Λιμενεργατικά της Καλαμάτας, lit. 'Kalamata dock-workers' events'), was a strike of Kalamata's harbor workers in May 1934 that resulted in the intervention of the army and killing of five dock-workers and two other residents of the town.

== Strikes of previous years in Kalamata ==
In October 1932 the dockworkers of the port of Kalamata asked to work in shifts so that all workers in the industry could earn some daily wages, but their request was not accepted by the port contractors and the workers went on strike. Clashes took place in which strikers were severely beaten by the police and strikebreakers. At the beginning of the following year, the dockworkers went on strike demanding that the Evangelistria rolling mill not operate so that they would not lose their jobs or at least those who would be fired would receive some compensation. In September 1933, there were fierce clashes between dockworkers and shipowners over the unloading of a ship. The climax of these conflicts was the murder of K. Kalogerakos, owner of a barge, by the president of the Union of Dockworkers, Apostolos Diamantopoulos.

== Events of 1934 ==
On April 26, 1934, a meeting was held in which representatives of the Ministry of Labor also participated, in which a plan was discussed to reduce the number of dockworkers by approximately 200 (as the rolling mill would be put into operation) and the establishment of a pension fund for those over 40 years of age, they would leave. But a dispute arose over the amount of compensation and the workers declared a strike for May 8. On this day the professionals of the city, to express their solidarity with the dockworkers, closed their shops. In the meantime, trade unionists from Athens, who agreed with the proposal for the operation of the rolling mill, arrived in Kalamata; however, by decision of the general assembly of the dockworkers, the latter rejected the agreement and the Athenian trade unionists.

Meanwhile, large-scale strikes occurred elsewhere in Greece: a strike in a cement factory in Elefsina started on May 1, which eventually lasted two months, while in Omonoia and Piraeus there were clashes between strikers and the police. Tobacco workers went on strike in Thessaloniki and Kavala and the demonstrations reached large dimensions.

In Kalamata, in the morning of May 9, a team of strikers tried to stop the functioning of the rolling mill and then the soldiers opened fired against them leaving five strikers dead and 10 injured. Afterwards, the strikers took the dead bodies of their comrades and carried them through the streets of the city, in a state of rage while cursing the murderers. Protestors threw rocks at the building of the Bank of Athens and entered the house of an employer causing damage. New clashes followed in which two more people died and three were seriously injured.

The events were condemned by workers throughout Greece and several protests and strikes in solidarity with Kalamata's strikers occurred the following days.

== Trial ==
In January 1935, a trial was held in Kalamata regarding the events of May of the previous year. However the ones sitting in the defendant's place where workers, 4 of whom were sentenced to 18 months in prison and two years of exile in Agios Efstratios.
