= Angelos Skafidas =

Greek footballer and coach

Angelos Skafidas (Άγγελος Σκαφιδάς) is a Greek soccer (footballer) player and a former coach. He played in the 1960s and the 1970s in the First and Second divisions with Kalamata F.C.

== A player ==
Angelos Skafidas was born in Kalamata and played throughout his soccer career. He played in the heart of the club along with the club's huff. He was a chief in the 1971–72 season and the team got the Second Division championships. In the 1972–73 season, he played in the premier division. At the end of the season, Kalamata was relegated but in 197 he won another second division title and entered the premier division again. He played only for a season before being relegated again to the second division.

Later on, he stopped playing football (soccer) and became a coach for different clubs with the Messinia FCA.

== Family ==
Angelos Skafidas married Vasia/Vassia Nikolakopoulou, a music producer on the radio and has a daughter Gioulika Skafida, an actress.

== Career ==
Years	Clubs	Divisions	Goals
until 1972	Kalamata	Second Division
1972–73	Kalamata	32	0
1973–74	Kalamata	Second Division
1974–75	Kalamata	16	0
Total	First Division	48	0
Total	Second Division		'

== Titles ==
- Second Division (2): 1972, 1974
