= Yaya (military) =

- Active: 1325—1582
- Country: Ottoman Empire
- Branch: Army
- Type: Infantry
- Engagements: Battle of Marica; Battle of Kosovo; Battle of Nicopolis; Capture of Kalamata (1659)

Yaya or Piyade, lasted approximately from 1325 to 1582, (Note: The studies, according to singular source document, stated that the studies attempted to examined the corps in two successive stages. The first stage were done examined by undergoing through studies of its military importance of the yaya corps. The 2nd one seems informingly unknown.) were institutions of infantry of military units of the Ottoman Empire, and some other medieval Anatolian beyliks. Many of them were Christian origin.

== Name ==
Yaya means "pedestrian" in Ottoman Turkish. It is of Turkic origin word. An alternative name, piyade, is derived from a Persian word with the same meaning. This latter name was also used in the series of dynasties that ruled the neighboring Persian state.

== Background ==
The early Ottoman military forces consisted of irregular nomadic cavalry and volunteer light infantry. These units were efficient against local Byzantine feudal lords but were unable to capture fortified castles by direct assault. This was the reason for Alaeddin Pasha including the establishment of this unit in his proposal for reorganization the military of the Ottoman Empire made in the mid 1320s. His brother, sultan Orhan, accepted his proposal and established yaya.

Yaya were precursors of the Janissary corps of the Ottoman military, which would become one of the most influential and increasingly political forces in the Ottoman state until the 19th century. Janissary Corps would be made of converted Christians from Balkans up to 1500(most of them Albanians, Bosnians and Eastern Romans). However, by 1550s when the Devshirme was abolished " de facto", the Janissary Corps would be dominated by Muslim born Ottomans, majority of them being Muslim Albanians.

== Organization ==
The commander of the Yaya unit was referred to as Yayabashi. Members of this units were both Christian and Muslim citizens of the Ottoman Empire who were sometimes granted land estates in the Balkans in exchange for military service. They were most irregular infantry Ottoman units because they usually served as armed laborers whose military skills were limited. Still, before Janissary units were established and expanded in 1380s and afterwards, yaya peasant infantry had important military function. By giving regular salary to yaya Ottomans acquired a standing army.

== Engagements ==
Among notable engagements of yaya military units are battles of Marica (1371) and Nicopolis (1396) where Ottoman infantry units, including yaya, were used to bait enemy heavy cavalry into an ambush between two flanks of more maneuverable light Ottoman cavalry.
