= Capture of Kalamata (1659) =

- Part of Cretan War (fifth Ottoman–Venetian war)
Date	mid-March 1659
Location	Kalamata, Morea
Result	Venetian victory
Territorial changes	Venetians conquer parts of Kalamata

Belligerents
Republic of Venice	Ottoman Empire

Commanders and leaders
Francesco Morosini	unknown Kapudan Pasha

Strength
unknown Maniots	6,000 infantry 2,000 sipahi

Capture of Kalamata (1659) were fought between the Ottomans and the Venetians during the cretan war.

Led by Francesco Morosini, he led his men and the other of his forces to capture Kalamata, which were part of the Ottoman rule at that time during the war. The town sustained and considerable damage before once and more to the collapse of the Turks, and progressively over time in 1685, the Republic of Venice took parts of Kingdom of Morea as well.

== Background ==
The battle was to divert the Ottomans attention on siege of Candia, and then raise a wider revolt. The Venetians took Kalamata with no efforts whatsoever, and as the Ottomans, they had abandoned their town as the Venetians capturing the Kalamata. The town and castles were plundered, and all of able-bodied men were carried off to serve as rowers in the Venetian galleys; Lazzaro Mocenigo, a Venetian noblemen attacked Chios in 1657, (Note: He also inflected some defeats against by them, between the year of 1655 to 1668, and were unable to turn the tide of the war.) continuingly as of Francesco Morosini attack Kalamata in 1659, which at that time, he had his naval militia occupied Kalamata on southern coast of Morea, and therefore took Torone from Chalcidic peninsula, as well as Çeşme on Anatolian coast, which is the opposite to Chios island.

Kalamata was ensued destroyed under the led of Francesco, carrying off of about fourteen pieces of canon from the castle, subsequently condemning the inhabitants to make them as a slave at the oar in specifically Francesco galleys, and also perpetuating to burn down all the house in the town. (Note: It was then destroyed again later when it was being found incapable of their defence. When destroy, the rest of inhabitants in this occasion remains in possession under Venetian protection.)

== Bibliography ==
- Setton, Kenneth Mayor (1991). Venice, Austria, and the Turks in the seventeenth century. p. 513. ISBN 9780871691927.
- Petitjean, Johann (2016). CHAPTER 7 The Papal Network: How the Roman Curia Was Informed about South-Eastern Europe, the Ottoman Empire and the Mediterranean (1645–1669). pp. 178–192. JSTOR 10.1163/j.ctt1w8h1ng.14.
- Finlay, George (1877). A History of Greece from its Conquest by the Romans to the Present Time, B.C. 146 to A.D. 1864, Vol. V: Greece under Othoman and Venetian Domination A.D. 1453–1821. Oxford: Clarendon Press. p. 177.
- Mikaberidze, Alexander (22 July 2011). Conflict and Conquest in the Islamic World. Greenwood. p. 1,042. ISBN 9781598843378.
- Finlay, George (1856). The History of Greece Under Othoman and Venetian Domination. W. Blackwood and sons. p. 367.
