= Kalamata Dance Megaron =

Dance Hall in Kalamata, Greece

Kalamata Dance Megaron Μέγαρο Χορού Καλαμάτας
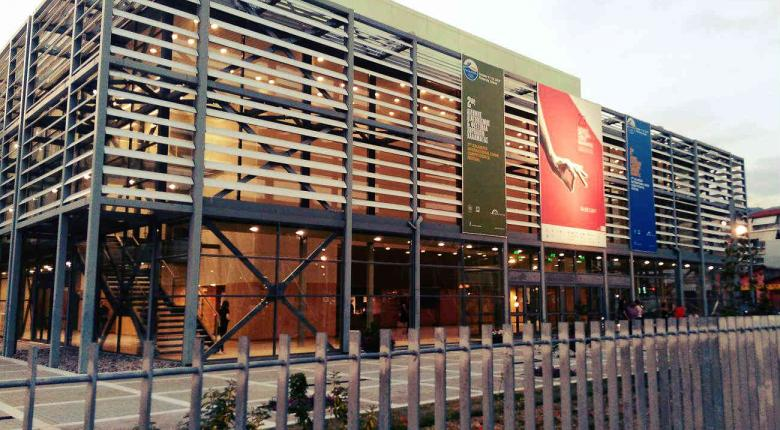
- Interactive map of Kalamata Dance Megaron; Μέγαρο Χορού Καλαμάτας
- Address: Artemidos and Klada street
- Location: Kalamata, Greece
- Coordinates: 37°02′22.46″N 22°06′27.68″E

The Kalamata Dance Megaron is a dance hall located in Kalamata, Greece. The venue has an imposing central stage, with a total area of 1,500 m^{2} (16,000 sq ft) and 675 seats spectator room, plus 15 special seats for disabled people, two large dance classrooms, a foyer at the entrance, dressing rooms, a canteen, administration rooms and other auxiliary spaces, with the ability to host theatrical performances of prose and cinema, theatre, large-sized productions with high set and stage design and other technical requirements from Greece and abroad. The venue is able to act as a convention center.

The venue has hosted the Kalamata International Dance Festival and the Kalamata International Choir Festival.

With an additional extra room of 350 m^{2} (3,800 sq ft), which is used for the preparation of dancers but also for parallel events to the main hall, it is the largest cultural building in the Peloponnese.
