= Kalamata olive =

Olive cultivar from Greece

Kalamata
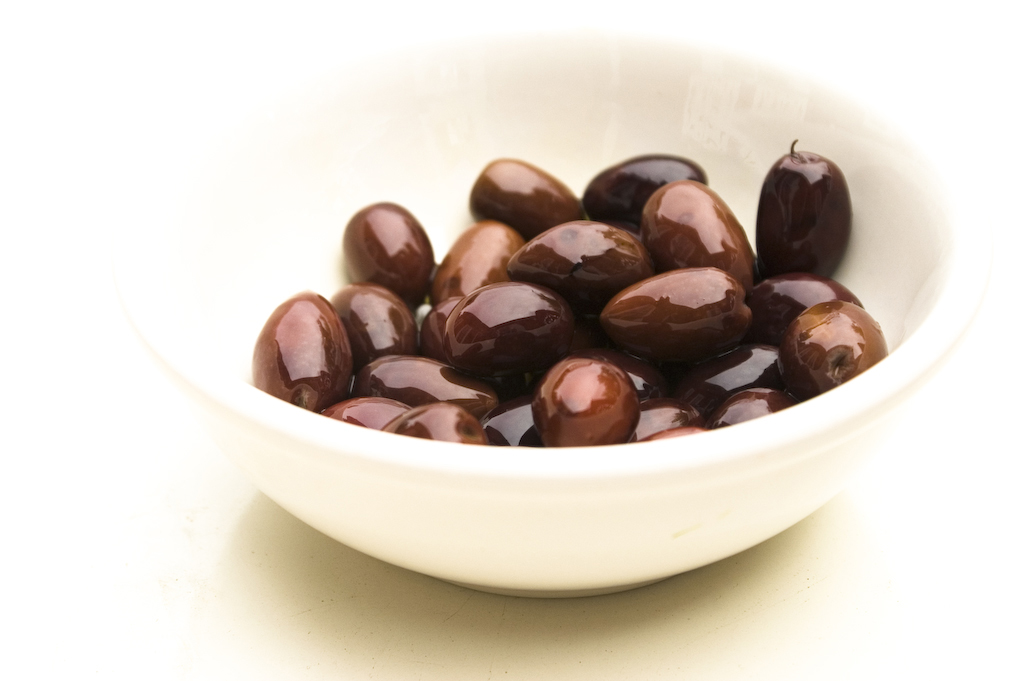
- A bowl of Kalamata olives

Olive (Olea europaea)
- Color of the ripe fruit: Dark purple
- Origin: Greece
- Notable regions: Kalamata
- Hazards: Verticillium wilt and cold
- Use: Table and oil
- Oil content: 6
- Symmetry: Slightly asymmetrical

Kalamata olive
Nutritional value per 100 g (3.5 oz)
- Energy: 284 kJ (68 kcal)
- Carbohydrates: 3g
- Fat: 6.8g
- Protein: 0g
- ^{†}Percentages estimated using US recommendations for adults.

The Kalamata olive is a large, dark purple olive with a smooth, meaty texture, named after the city of Kalamata in the southern Peloponnese, Greece. Often used as table olives, they are usually preserved in wine vinegar or olive oil.

Typically the term "Kalamata" legally refers to a region of Greece where these olives are grown, but a few countries (mainly outside the United States and European Union) use the name for such olives grown anywhere, even outside of Greece. Within the EU (and other countries that ratified PDO agreements or similar laws), the name is protected with PDO status, which means that the name can only be used for olives (and olive oil) from the region around Kalamata. Olives of the same variety grown elsewhere are marketed as Kalamon olives in the EU and sometimes elsewhere.

== Description ==
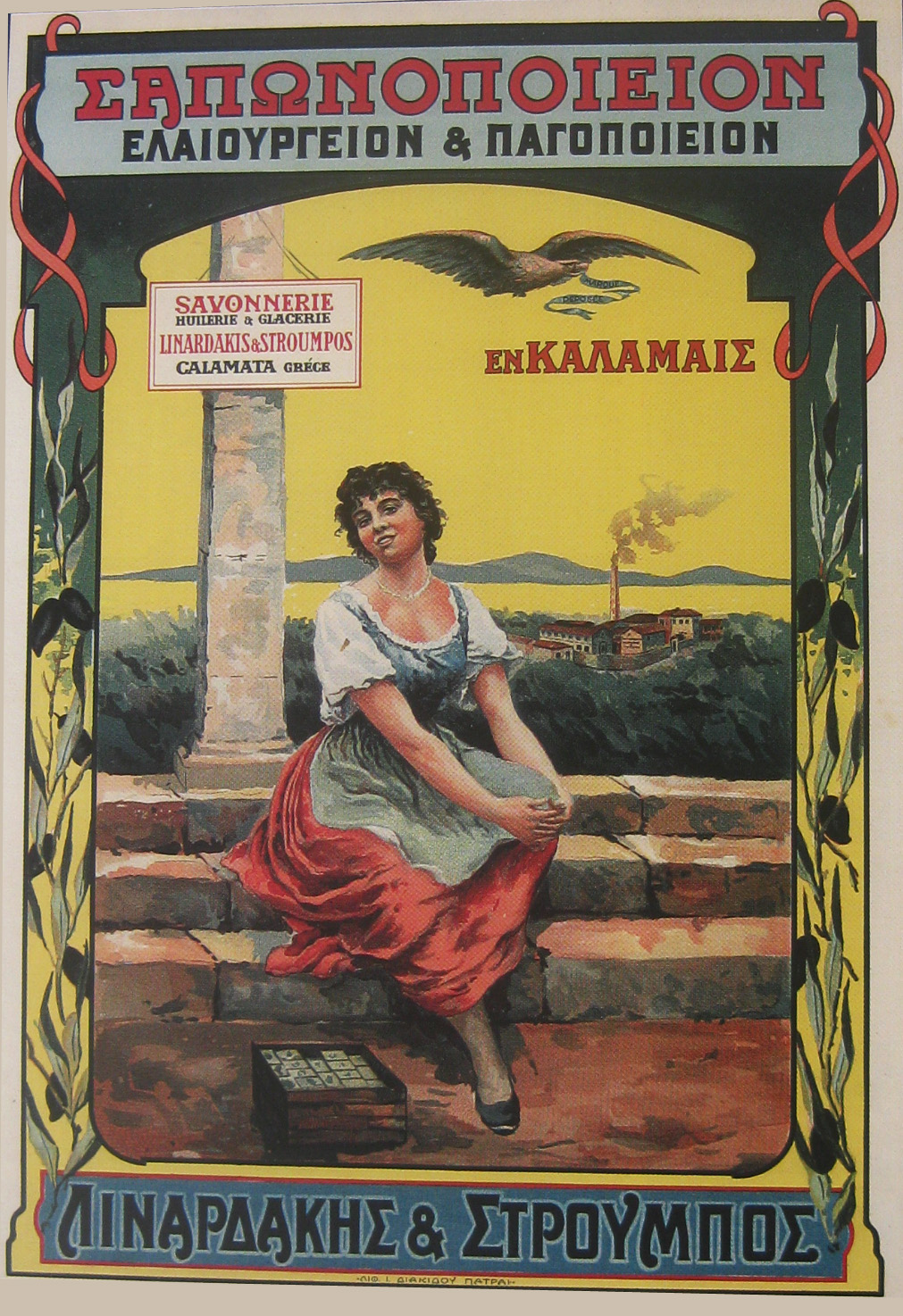
Old advertisement for soap-making from Kalamata olives

Kalamata olives are so-named because they were originally grown in the region around Kalamata, which includes Messenia and nearby Laconia, both located on the Peloponnese peninsula. They are now grown in many places around the world, including the United States and Australia. They are almond-shaped, plump, dark purple olives from a tree distinguished from the common olive by the size of its leaves, which grow to twice the size of other olive varieties. The trees are intolerant of cold and are susceptible to Verticillium wilt but are resistant to olive knot and to the olive fruit fly.

Kalamata olives, which cannot be harvested green, must be hand-picked to avoid bruising.

== Synonyms ==
Aetonychalea: Kalamata (old: Kalámai);
Aetonychi: Greece;
Aetonycholia: Kalamata, Patras;
Calamata: Agrínio, Aitoliko, Cyprus, Iznik, Kalamata, Lakonia, Messini, Peloponnese, Sparta, Western Cape (South Africa), California (USA);
Calamatiani: Greece;
Calamon: California, Kalamata, Crete, Lakonia, Lamia, Messini, Patras, Peloponnese, Tunisia, Western Australia;
Chondrolia: Kalamata, Lakonia, Messini, Patras;
Kalamata Jumbo and Kalamata Tiny: Western Australia;
Kalamatiani: Peloponnese;
Kalamon: Greece, China, Cyprus, Crete, Peloponnese, Perugia (Italy), South Africa;
Karakolia: Greece;
Nychati: Kalamata, Peloponnese;
Nychati di Kalamata: Aitoliko, Kalamata, Lakonia;
Tsigeli: Greece;
Karamursel Su Kalamata: Bursa, Gebze, Gölcük, Karamürsel, Kocaeli, the Marmara region;
Su Zeytini (Turkey).

== Preparation ==
Kalamata olive (top) in comparison to Koroneiki (left) and old variety (right)

There are two methods of preparing Kalamata olives, known as the long and short methods. The short method debitters the olives by packing them in water or weak brine, which is changed daily for around a week. Once debittered, they are packed in brine and wine vinegar with a layer of olive oil and slices of lemon. The olives are often slit to decrease the processing time further. The long method involves slitting the olives and placing them in strong brine for up to three months to debitter them. Some polyphenol remains in the olives after processing, giving them a slightly bitter taste.
