= Archaeological Museum of Messenia =

Coordinates: 37°2′37.3″N 22°6′48″E

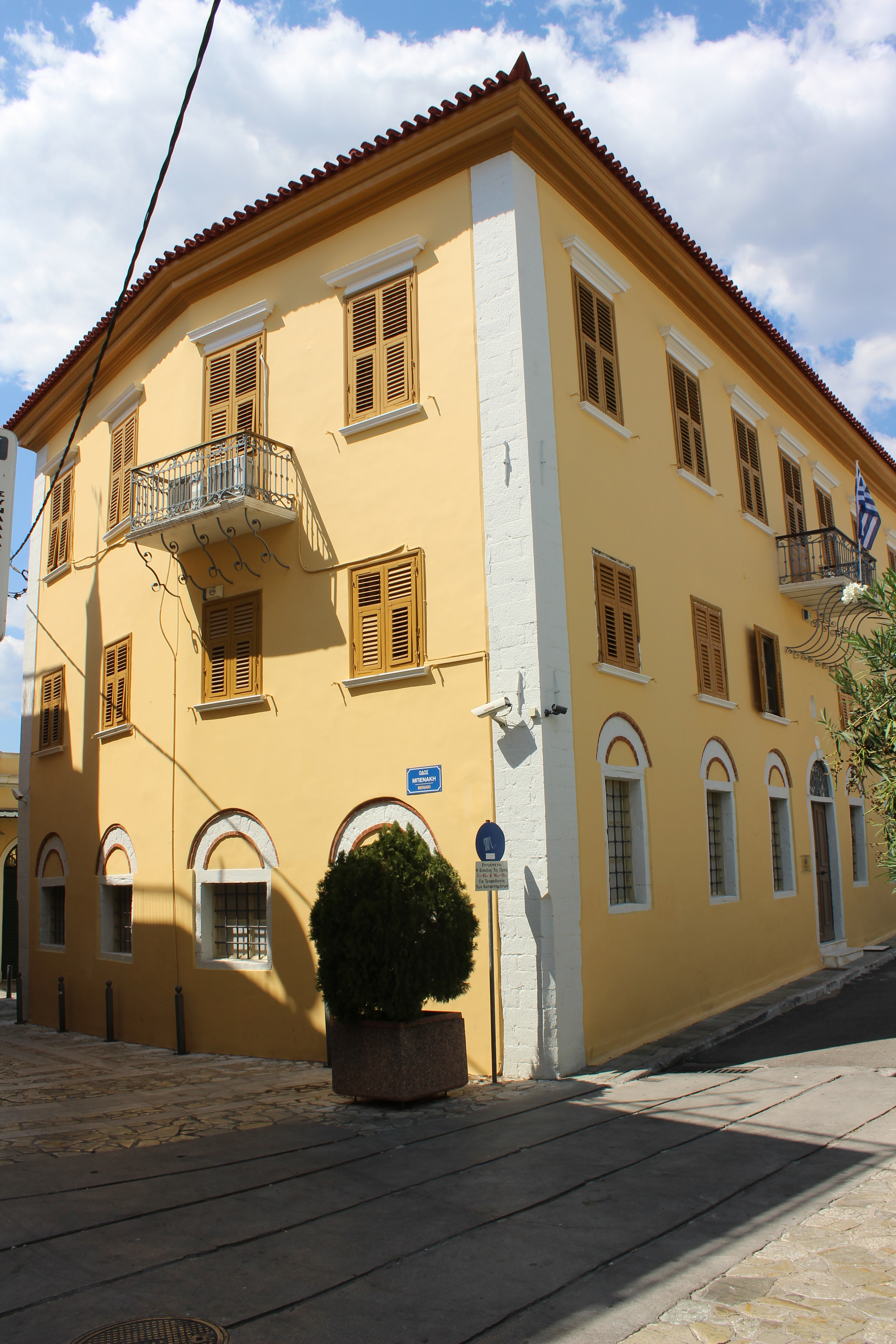
- Established: 2009
- Location: Kalamata, Greece
- Type: Archaeological museum
- Website: Official website

The Archaeological Museum of Messenia is located in Kalamata, the capital of Messenia in southern Greece. It is in located in 3, Agiou Ioanni street.

The museum is built on the site of the city's old market hall. Among else its collection includes the finds which were formerly kept in the Benakeion Archaeological Museum of Kalamata, a remarkable 1742 building of Venetian architecture which collapsed during the 1986 earthquake. The new museum holds antiquities from Messenia from prehistoric and Mycenaean times to the Byzantine and Latin eras, divided along the four geographic areas that traditionally made up Messenia: Kalamata, Messene, Pylia and Triphylia.
