= Limnae (Peloponnesus) =

Coordinates: 37°07′18″N 22°11′30″E

Limnae or Limnai (Ancient Greek: Λίμναι) was a village on the frontiers of ancient Messenia and Laconia, containing a temple of Artemis Limnatis, used jointly by the Messenians and Lacedaemonians. An outrage offered by the Messenians to some Lacedaemonian virgins at the festival of this goddess is said to have been the cause of the First Messenian War. The possession of this temple, and of the Ager Dentheliatis, the district in which it was situated, was a frequent subject of the dispute between the Lacedaemonians and Messenians down to the time of the Roman emperors.

Its site is tentatively located near the modern Volimnos.
