= Calamae =

Village of ancient Messenia

Coordinates: 37°02′36″N 22°10′47″E

Calamae or Kalamai (Ancient Greek: Καλάμαι) was a village of ancient Messenia, near Limnae, and at no great distance from the frontiers of Laconia.

Its site is located near the modern Εlaiochori.
