= Calama =

Calama may refer to the following places and jurisdictions :

- Calama (Numidia), an ancient city and former bishopric in the Roman province of Numidia, now a Latin Catholic titular see
  - Guelma, a city in Algeria, the successor of ancient Calama
- Calama, Chile
- Kalama, Washington, United States
- Calama (τὰ Καλαμα), a place on Gedrosia's shore that Nearchus visited with his fleet
