= Diples =

Greek dessert

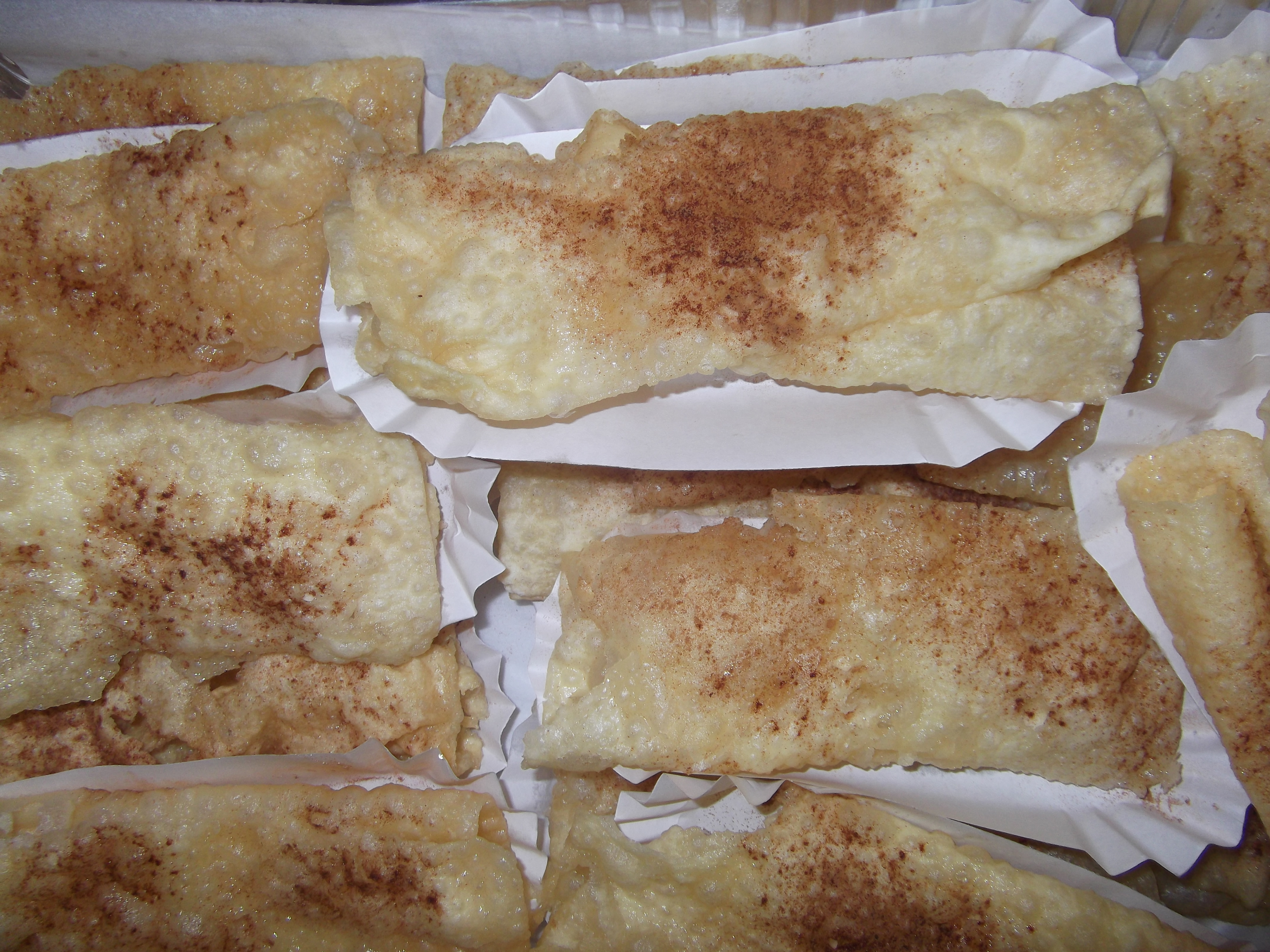
- Alternative names: Thiples
- Course: Dessert
- Place of origin: Greece, Peloponnese
- Main ingredients: Dough, syrup or honey

Diples or Thiples (Greek: Δίπλες) is a Greek dessert from the Peloponnese, made of thin sheet-like dough. They are essentially the same as angel wings, except that they are dipped in syrup rather than served dry.

The dough is rolled into long, thin strips, fried and folded in hot oil and then dipped in a sugar or honey syrup. Diples can be made in different shapes, of which the most common are bow ties and spirals. Diples are a typical dessert in the Peloponnese and are also served at weddings and at New Year's celebrations.

Another form uses an iron mould dipped in diples batter and cooked in cooking oil until the diples separates from the mould. It is topped with syrup, crushed walnuts, and cinnamon.

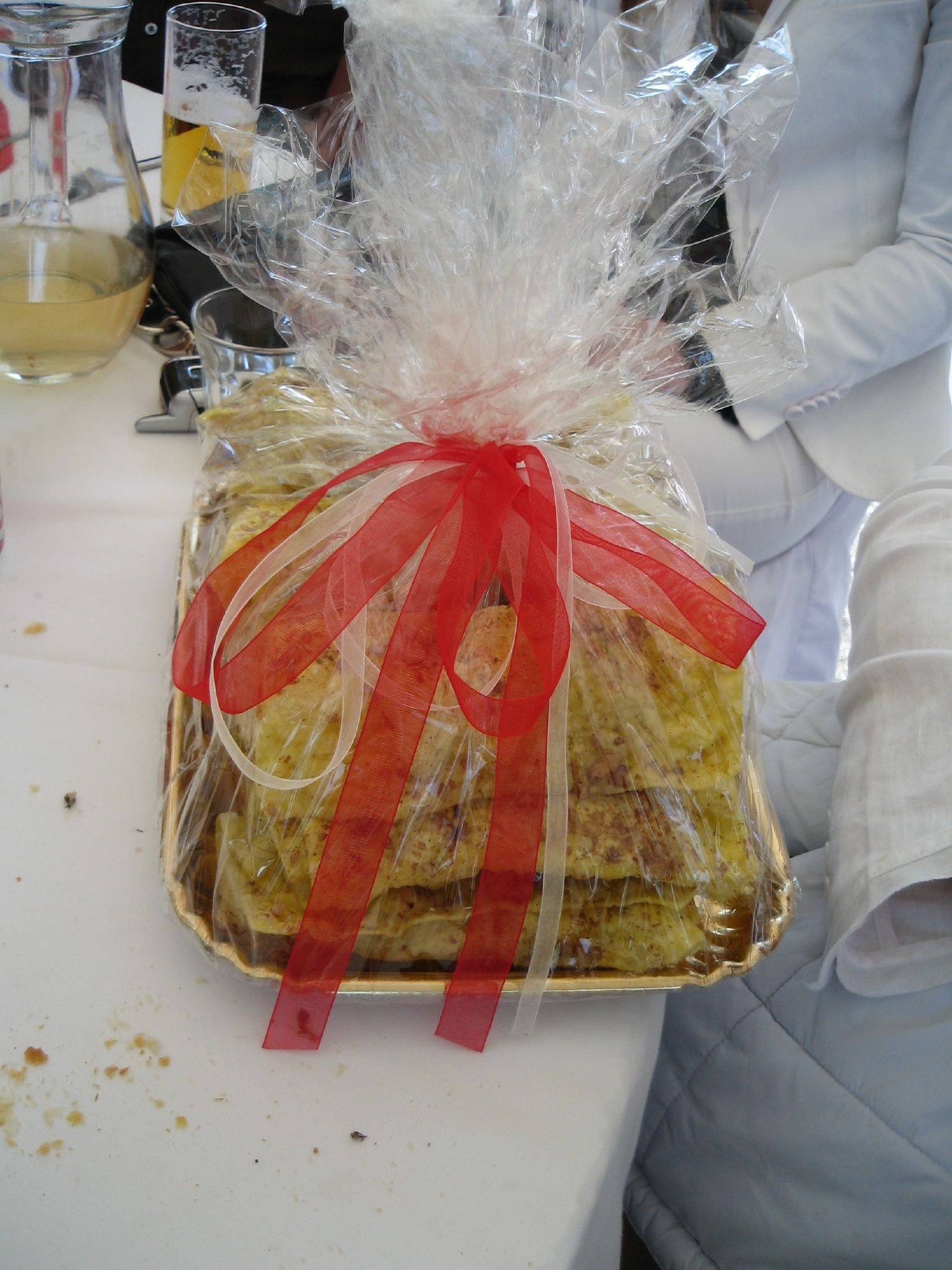
Diples

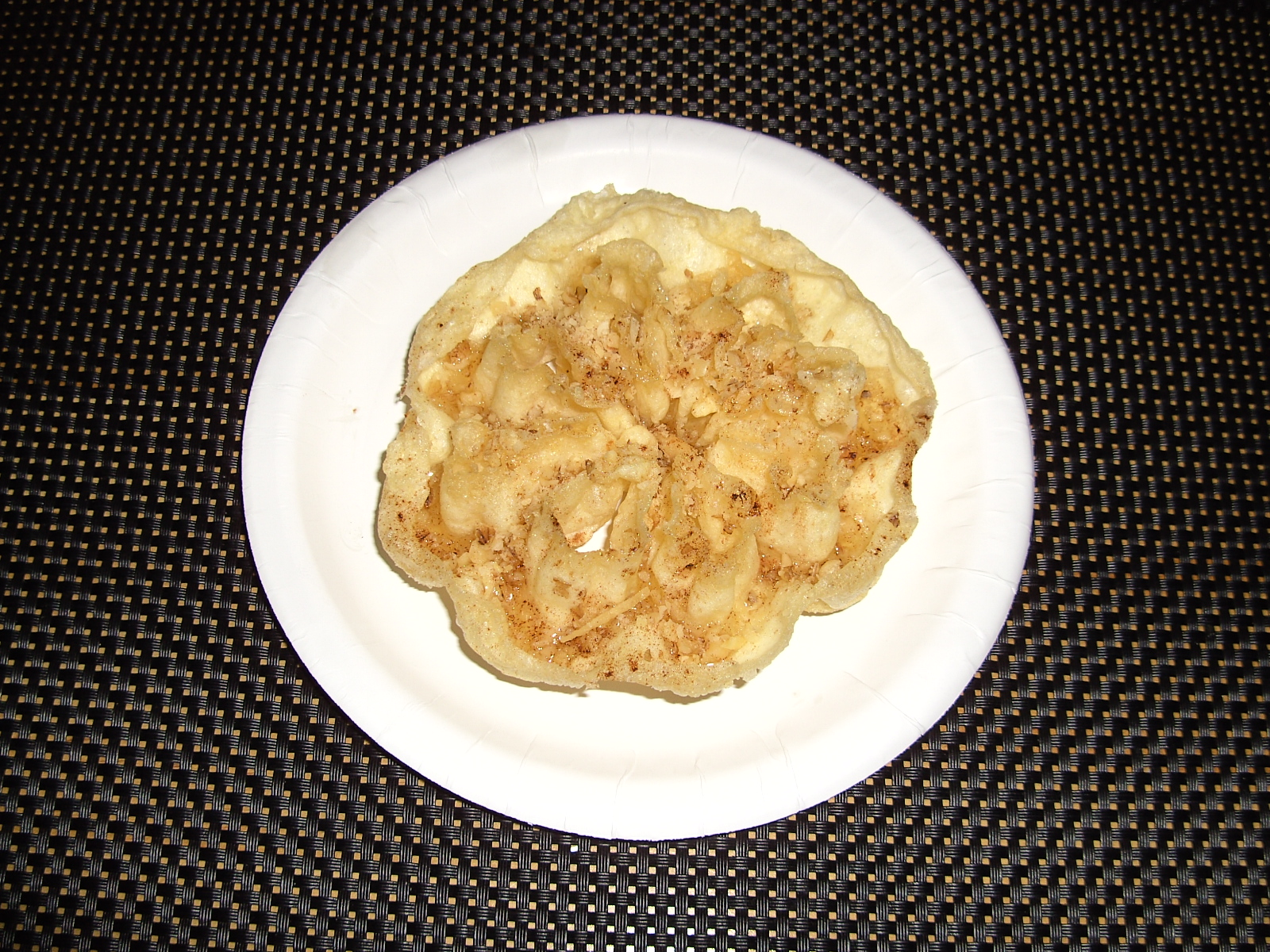
Diples made on an iron mould dipped in batter and cooked in cooking oil

== See also ==
- List of doughnut varieties
