= Siege of Thodorou =

- Part of the Cretan War (Fifth Ottoman–Venetian War)
Date	25 June 1645
Location	Thodorou, Venice
Result	Ottoman victory

Belligerents
Ottoman Empire	Republic of Venice

Commanders and leaders
Silahdar Yusuf Pasha	Biagio Giuliani

Strength
Unknown	Unknown

Casualties and losses
Unknown	Unknown

Siege of Thodorou, was one of the sieges of the Cretan War (1645–1669).

In 1645, the Ottoman navy under the command of Silahdar Yusuf Pasha, in an expedition against Crete, which was held by the Republic of Venice, captured the castle on the island of Agioi Theodoroi, which they besieged on June 25.

With this conquest, the Ottoman navy found a safe haven and landed troops on Crete. On June 27, the Siege of Chania began.

== Siege ==
Gerdar of Crete Kapudan Pasha Silahdar Yusuf Pasha; He landed the Amasya Liva Ahmed Pasha and the Trikala Bey with the serdengeçti soldiers, janissaries and Tunus and Tripoli Eyalet soldiers in boats on the night of June 24/25, 1645. Several of the ships anchored within range of the fortresses. The Venetian fortress guards gathered all their forces in this fortress before the arrival of the Turkish soldiers in order to hold the fortress on the coast and evacuated the fortress on the hill.

The Turkish landing party took advantage of this and captured the Turlulu fortress (Yukarıhisar) on the hill without a fight and surrounded the St. Maria fortress on the coast from land and sea. The Venetian soldiers could not put up a strong resistance in the siege that began in the morning. Thereupon, the castle commander Biagio Giuliani gave a false surrender sign with about 100 soldiers and killed the Turkish soldiers who approached the castle by exploding the sewer. In return, the explosion also destroyed the castle walls. The Turkish unit that attacked through the gap that opened captured the castle after four hours of resistance and put all the guards to the sword.

After this, the Ottoman navy, which had found a safe haven, entered the Agioi Theodoroi and the Nazarta port on the Crete coast and landed cannons on the shore.

== Aftermath ==
The Ottoman navy determined Chania as the bridgehead while preparing for the Landing Operation to be carried out on the island of Crete. However, in order to start the landing and support it during the landing, it was decided to seize the Agioi Theodoroi, which was 3–4 miles off the mainland and could shelter the navy in stormy weather and in order to capture the castle of Chania. On the island, there were two castles built by the Venetians, about a mile apart, with steep cliffs on both sides, 9–10 meters high and 4.5–5 meters thick, containing cannons and various supplies, and surrounded by a rampart (one by the sea, the other on a hill).
