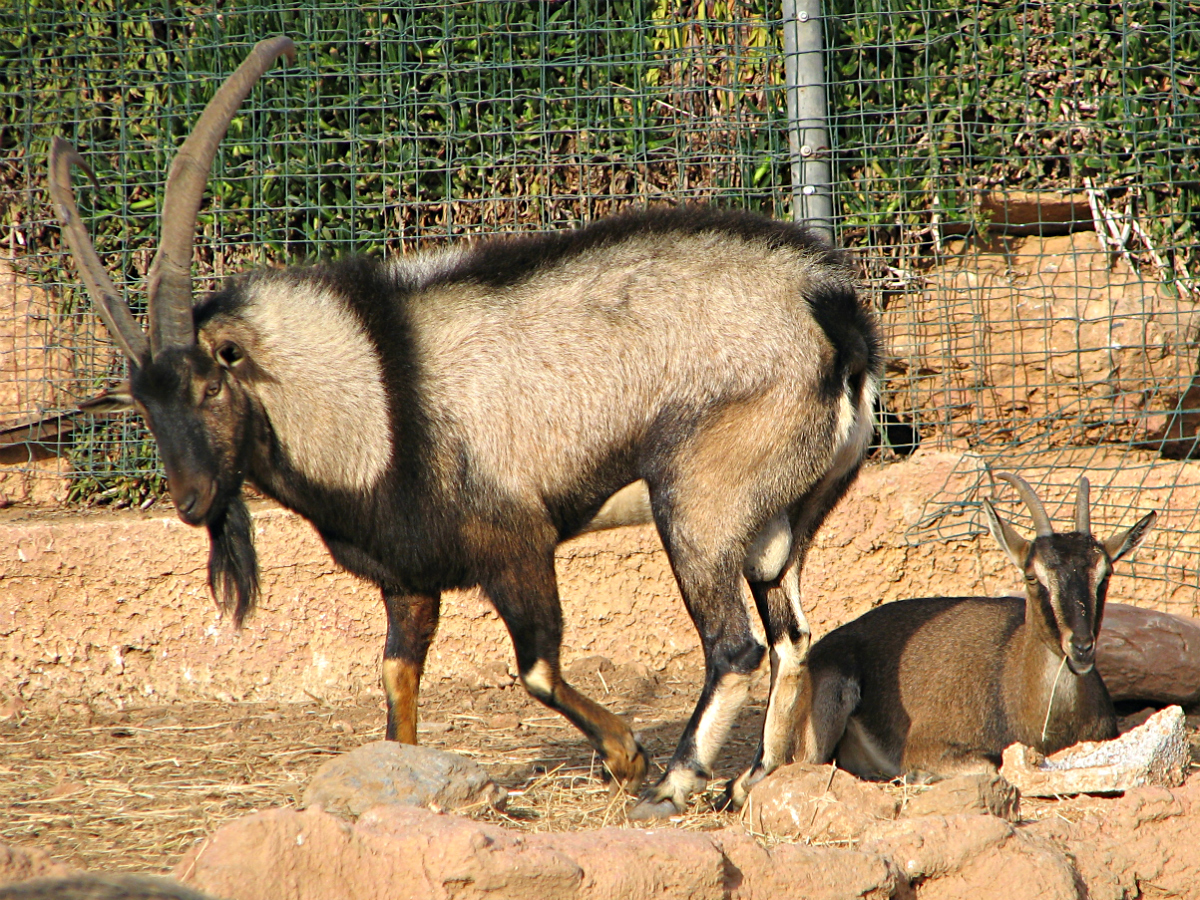
- Male and female in captivity

Conservation status
- Domesticated

Scientific classification
- Kingdom: Animalia
- Phylum: Chordata
- Class: Mammalia
- Order: Artiodactyla
- Family: Bovidae
- Subfamily: Caprinae
- Genus: Capra
- Species: C. hircus
- Subspecies: C. h. cretica

Trinomial name
- Capra hircus cretica (Schinz, 1838)

Synonyms
- Capra aegagrus cretica

= Kri-kri =

Feral goat

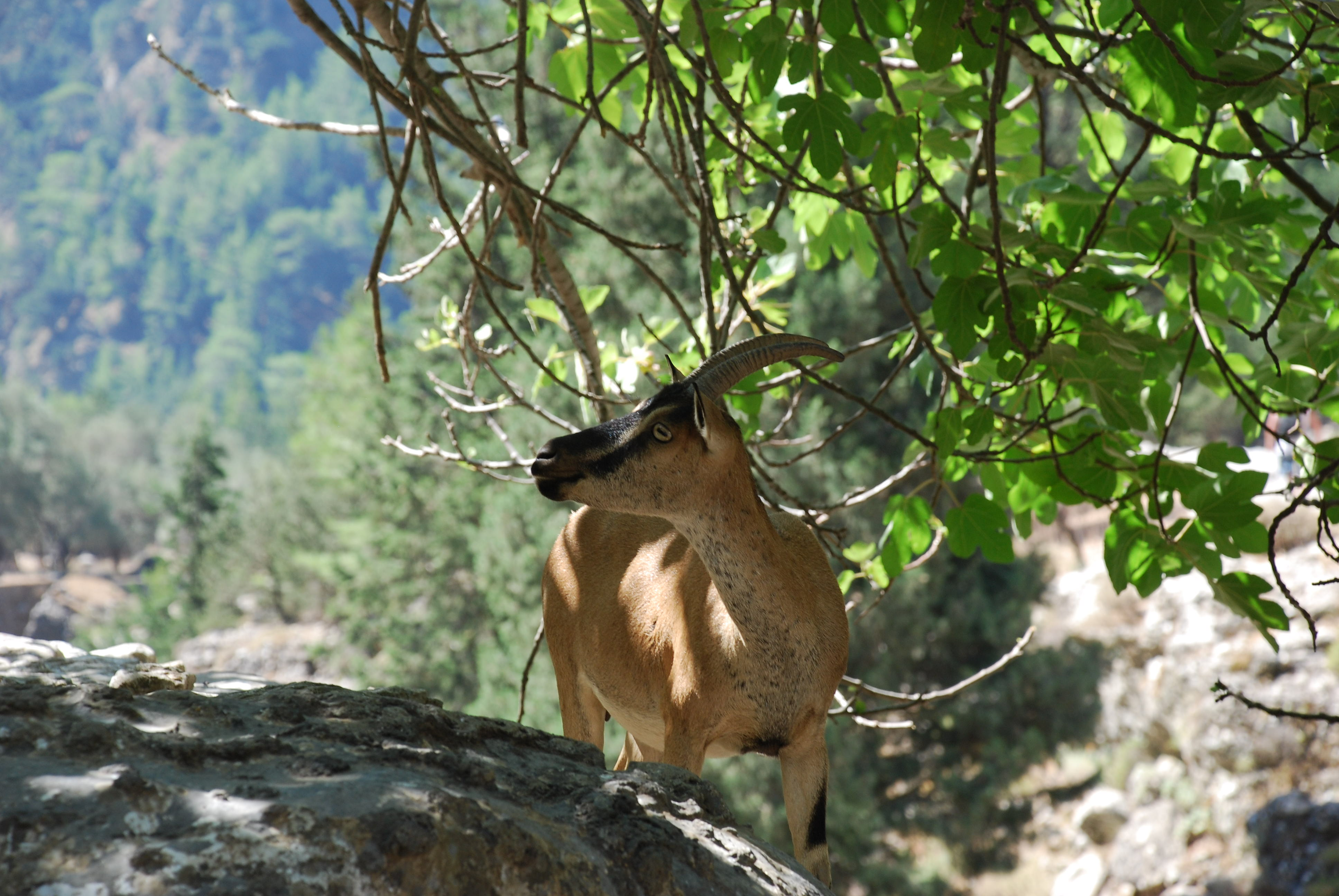
Adult female in natural habitat, Samaria Gorge National Park

The kri-kri (Capra hircus cretica), sometimes called the Cretan goat, Agrimi, or Cretan Ibex, is a feral goat inhabiting the Eastern Mediterranean, previously considered a subspecies of wild goat. The kri-kri today is found only in Greece: specifically on Crete and on three small islands off its coast (Dia, Thodorou, and Agii Pantes); as well as on the island of Sapientza (Messenian Oinousses) off the southwestern coast of Peloponnese, where it was brought in great numbers in order to protect the species from extinction.

== Description and behavior ==
The kri-kri has a light brownish coat with a darker band around its neck. It has two horns that sweep back from the head. In the wild they are shy and avoid humans, resting during the day. The animal can leap some distance or climb seemingly sheer cliffs.

== Habitat ==
The kri-kri is not thought to be indigenous to Crete, most likely having been imported to the island during the time of the Minoan civilization. It was once common throughout the Aegean but the peaks of the 2,400 m (8,000 ft) White Mountains of Western Crete are their last strongholds—particularly a series of almost vertical 900 m (3,000 ft) cliffs called 'the Untrodden'—at the head of the Samaria Gorge. This mountain range, which hosts another 14 endemic animal species, is protected as a UNESCO Biosphere Reserve. In total, their range extends to the White Mountains, the Samaria National Forest and the islets of Dia, Thodorou, and Agii Pandes. Recently some were introduced onto two more islands.

== History ==
By 1960, the kri-kri was under threat, with a population below 200. It had been the only meat available to mountain guerillas during the German occupation in World War II. Its status was one of the reasons why the Samaria Gorge became a national park in 1962. There are still only about 2,000 animals on the island and they are considered vulnerable: hunters still seek them for their tender meat, grazing grounds have become scarcer and disease has affected them. Hybridization is also a threat, as the population has interbred with ordinary goats. Hunting them is strictly prohibited.

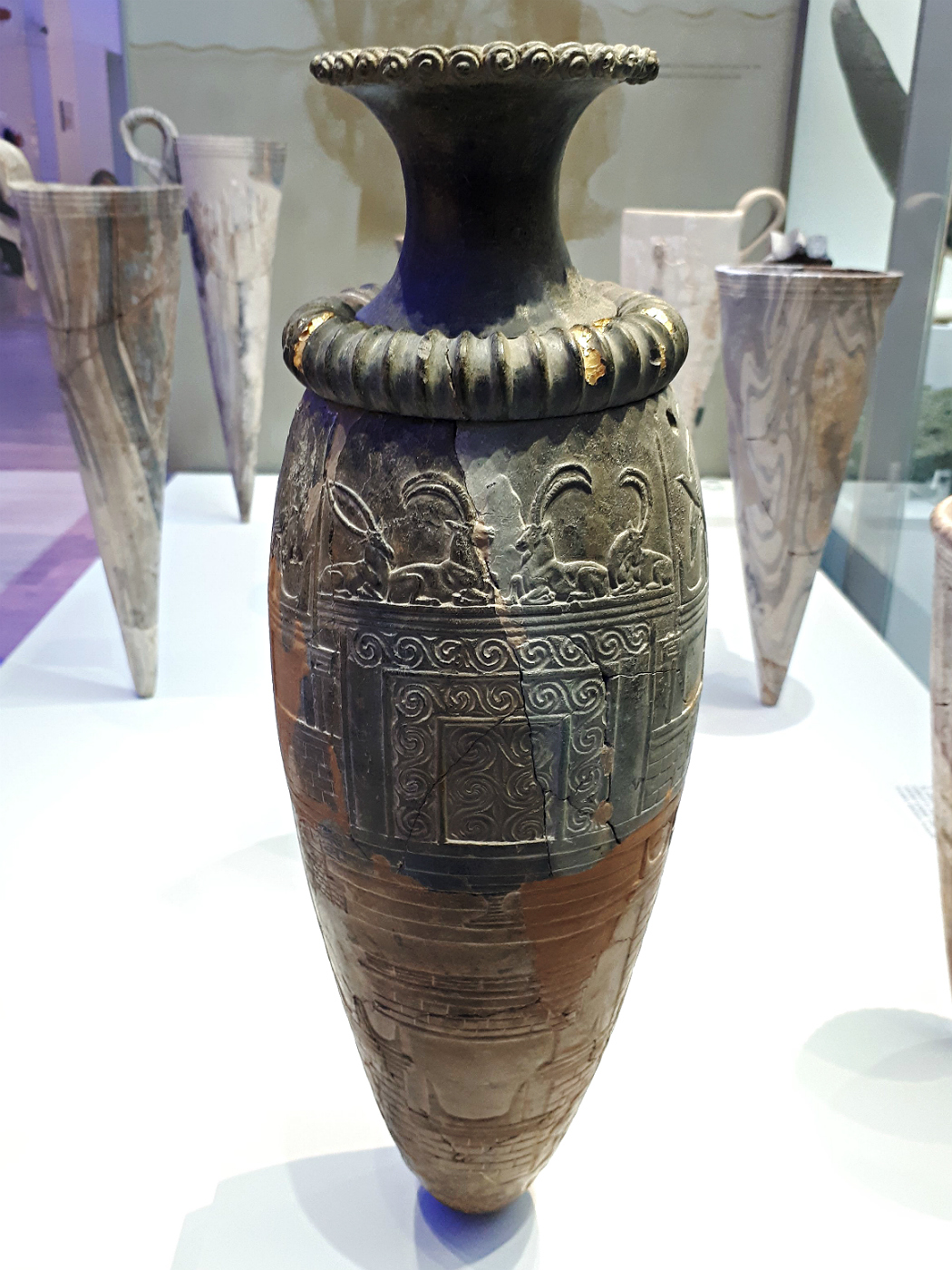
Minoan rhyton from the Palace of Zakros, depicting a rocky landscape with Cretan goats.

Archaeological excavations have unearthed several depictions of the kri-kri. Some academics believe that the animal was worshiped during antiquity. On the island, males are often called 'agrimi' (Greek: αγρίμι, i.e. 'the wild one'), while the name 'sanada' (Greek: σανάδα) is used for the female. The kri-kri is a symbol of the island, much used in tourism marketing and official literature.

== Origin ==
As molecular analyses demonstrate, the kri-kri is not, as previously thought, a distinct subspecies of wild goat. Rather, it is a feral domestic goat, derived from the first stocks of goats domesticated in the Levant and other parts of the Eastern Mediterranean around 8000-7500 BCE. Therefore, it represents a nearly ten-thousand-year-old "snapshot" of the first domestication of goats.

== See also ==
- Sapientza
- Feral goats
- European mouflon
- Auckland Island pig, redomesticated pig population
- Campbell Island cattle, exterminated feral cattle population
- Chillingham Cattle and White Park, culturally significant (semi-)feral cattle populations
