= Battle of Chania (1646) =

The Battle of Chania took place on 14 August 1646, when the fleet of the Republic of Venice and her allies, under Giovanni Cappello, tried to destroy the Ottoman ships at anchor in the port of Chania, on Crete. The attack was a failure, as the Venetians could not penetrate the harbour defences.

== Background ==
The Cretan War began with the Ottoman landing on Crete in late June 1645, followed by the conquest of Chania on 22 August 1645. Early attempts by the Venetians and their allies to recover Chania failed, partly due to adverse weather conditions but mostly due to the divided command of the Christian allies. In the next year, the Venetians tried to blockade the Dardanelles, thus depriving the Ottoman forces on Crete from supplies and reinforcements, while also applying pressure on the Ottomans by disrupting the flow of supplies to the Ottoman capital, Constantinople. Despite scoring a success when facing the far larger Ottoman fleet, the Venetians were ultimately unable to maintain the blockade, and the Ottoman fleet was able to break through to Chios, where they took on 20,000 troops and provisions. The Venetian commander, Giovanni Cappello, was old and hesitant, while the usual disagreements as to the best course of action between the various Venetian and allied commanders paralyzed the Christian fleet, which was further weakened by disease and disgruntled by arrears in pay. As a result, the Ottoman fleet of 80 galleys, 3 galleasses, and over 200 transports and lighter vessels arrived unmolested at Chania on 11 July, and found the Venetian squadrons dispersed and unable to offer effective resistance; the Ottomans entered Chania, while half their galleys took position at the San Todoro island.

== Attempts to attack Chania ==
On the same night, Cappello ordered his entire fleet to sea, but an adverse westerly wind forced the Venetians to return to their anchorage at Souda Bay. Three days later, Cappello sailed out again, and even deployed his fleet in battle formation but hesitated to attack; the Papal and Hospitaller commanders considered the attack pointless, as the Ottomans had reached Chania. Cappello dithered until the wind again changed, and forced the Christian fleet to return to Souda. The Ottomans were not idle, however: their troops moved over land from Chania to Souda, and established artillery positions that could fire on the Christian ships at anchor. The Venetians had to move their anchorage from the inner bay to its mouth, where the Venetian forts guarding the entrance could shield them. On the night of 12 August, the Papal and Hospitaller ships left the main fleet to meet up with a supply ship near Kythira (Cerigo). To their surprise, as they were rounding Cape Spada on the next morning, they saw the Venetian fleet sailing up behind them, en route to attack Chania. The Papal and Hospitaller ships hastily rejoined the Venetian fleet. The Christian fleet arrived before Chania on 13 August and anchored three miles off the city, with the galleys forced to wait until the sailing ships had caught up.

== Attack on 14 August ==
On the next day, 14 August, Cappello ordered an attack on the Ottoman ships at Chania. The Ottomans placed their six large galleasses at the entrance of the harbour, with the remainder of their ships behind them, while the Venetian fleet advanced in two parts: the forty sailing ships under Battista Grimani in line ahead from the west, and the galleys in line abreast from the east. The Venetian galleys opened fire on the forts, while Grimani, taking advantage of a northerly wind, sailed from west to east, firing his starboard guns, before wearing and returning east to west closer to the harbour. On his third passage across the Ottoman position he sent in two fireships, but the chains blocking the harbour entrance stopped them. Three other fireships that followed them were equally unsuccessful. Unable to do any real damage to the Ottoman ships in the harbour, Cappello was forced to order a return to Souda, while the Papal and Hospitaller ships resumed their course for Kythira.

== Aftermath ==
Despite having agreed to cooperate with Cappello in intercepting Ottoman supply fleets, the disheartened allied squadrons left Kythira for their homes on 8 September. Cappello was joined by a squadron of French ships under François de Nuchèze, but they too returned home in late October. Cappello failed to prevent the Ottoman galleys from sailing to Volos in Greece and return with fresh supplies to Crete, while an Ottoman attack on Souda failed. The Ottomans then laid siege to Rethymno. Cappello brought reinforcements to Souda and Rethymno and then tried to blockade the Ottoman fleet in Chania, but failed due to poor cooperation between galleasses and sailing ships, allowing a large part of the Ottoman fleet to escape north. Rethymno surrendered on 13 November. This succession of failures led to the dismissal of Cappello and his replacement as Captain General of the Sea by Giovanni Battista Grimani. On his return to Venice, Cappello was tried for incompetence, but was let go in view of the damage wrought by disease among his crews.

== Sources ==
- Anderson, R. C. (1952). Naval Wars in the Levant 1559–1853. Princeton: Princeton University Press.
- Setton, Kenneth Meyer (1991). Venice, Austria, and the Turks in the Seventeenth Century. Philadelphia: The American Philosophical Society. ISBN 0-87169-192-2.
