= Archaeological Museum of Chora =

- Αρχαιολογικό Μουσείο Χώρας
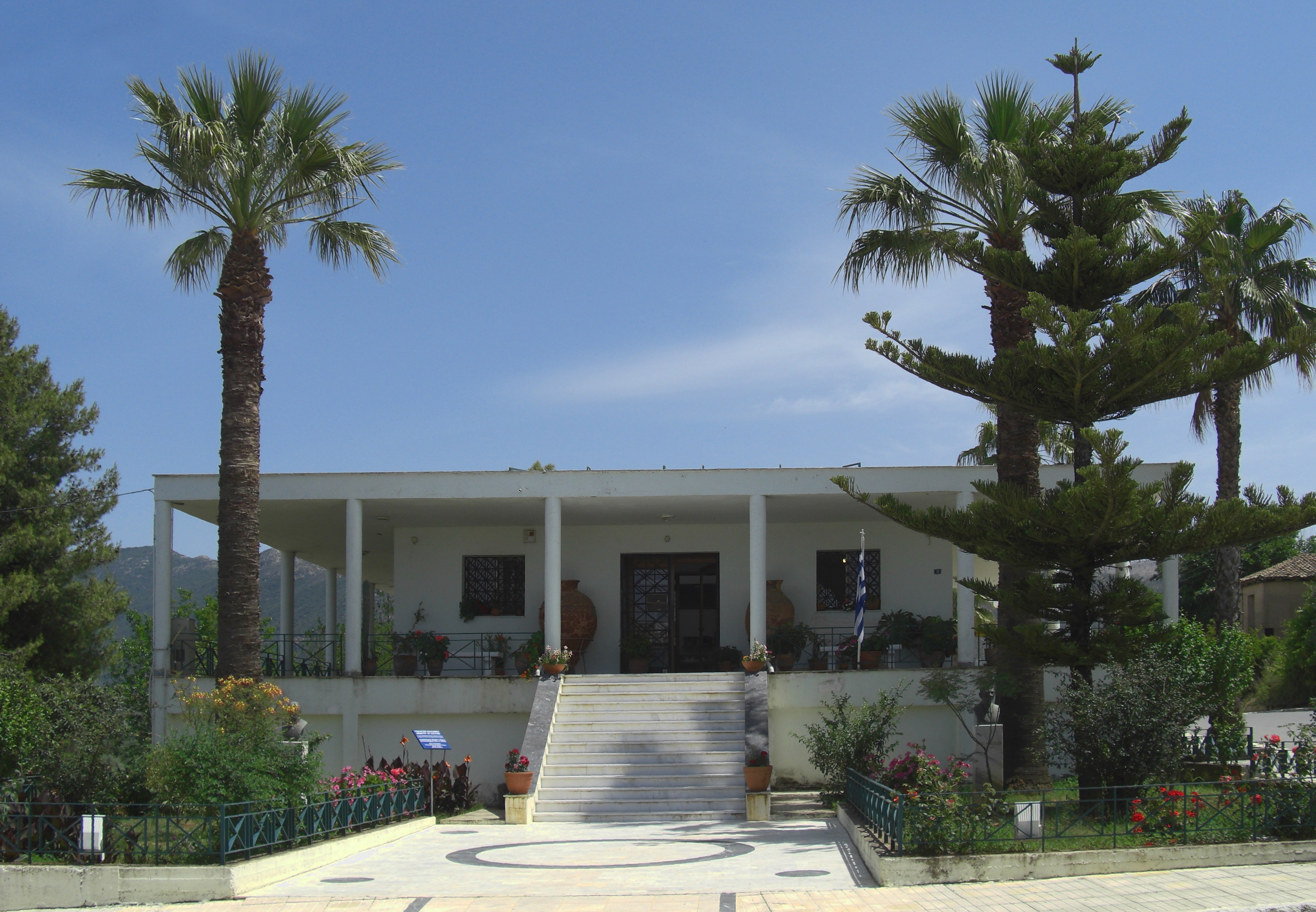

- Location of the museum in Greece
- Established: 1969
- Location: Chora, Messenia, Greece
- Coordinates: 37.0536°N 21.7207°E
- Type: Archaeological museum
- Key holdings: Finds from excavations at the Palace of Nestor, Pylia, and Trifylia
- Founder: Greek Archaeological Service

The Archaeological Museum of Chora is a museum in Chora, Messenia, in southern Greece, whose collections focus on the Mycenaean civilization, particularly from the excavations at the Palace of Nestor and other regions of Messenia. The museum was founded in 1969 by the Greek Archaeological Service under the auspices of the Ephorate of Antiquities of Olympia. At the time, the latter included in its jurisdiction the larger part of Messenia.

== The museum building ==
The museum was built to shelter and exhibit finds from the excavations of Carl Blegen at the Palace of Nestor in Epano Englianos, as well as those of Spyridon Marinatos in the regions of Pylia and Trifylia. Because of their contributions to the museum, the busts of both archaeologists are positioned at the staircase leading to the museum's entrance. On either side of the entrance stand large burial pithoi of the Middle Helladic period, from the tumuli of Kokorakou, Peristeria, and Agios Ioannis, Papoulia.

The building has two stories: the exhibition space is on the elevated ground floor, and the basins are used as storage for the archaeological material and as a study area. The exhibition space is divided into three consecutive galleries as well as a vestibule that is used as a cloakroom, museum shop and ticket office. The galleries hold finds from the excavations of the Palace of Nestor, the tholos tombs of the Englianos area, and other nearby archaeological sites. Most of the finds are grouped according to the location where they were found.

== Room 1 ==
The first room of the museum contains items from the excavations in Pylia and Trifyliaare. Cases 1, 2, 4, 6, 7 and 8 display finds from the extensive cemetery at Volimidia, dated to the Late Helladic I-IIIB (Mycenaean) period (1550–1200 BC).

=== Cases 1 and 2 ===
Cases 1 and 2 contain grave goods from the tombs of the Angelopoulos group and the Vorias-Tsouleas group at Volimidia, excavated by Marinatos in 1952–54. Some of the most important finds are small stirrup jars, jugs, keftiu-type cups, composite vessels consisting of two or three alabaster pieces joined with one single handle, and a small prochous (jug for pouring water) covered on the lid and spout with a sieve.

=== Case 3 ===
Case 3 contains finds from the Middle and Late Helladic burials at Routsi, Mysinochori, which is only a few kilometers from Englianos and Chora. The chamber and tholos tombs at Routsi were in use from 1680 to 1300 B.C. The first excavations were carried out by Marinatos, and the site was further investigated by G.S. Korres in the 1980s. The Middle helladic tumuli contained burials in pithoid jars. The Late Helladic tholos tombs, although relatively small (average diameter 5 meters) were rich in grave goods, particularly in luxury items.

Tholos tomb II, which was found intact, apparently contained members of the local elite, as attested by the finds. They include a copper sword, three copper daggers with inlay decoration of niello, pottery, jewelry, gems, and seals. Some of the objects were made of gold and precious stones, such as amber, and were used for necklaces. In total, the tholos contained five burials in pit graves, one of which was a little "princess".

Among the pottery exhibits is an alabaster, with alternating black and off-white slip in a wavy pattern, a bevelled jug with spiral motives, and a pithoid jar decorated with schematic ivy leaves. All of these items are either directly imported from Minoan Crete or imitating Minoan models.

There is also a pair of small scale discs; scholars believe that scales were symbolically placed in tombs in order to weigh the soul of the deceased in the underworld. The copper pan on display is of particular interest because of its muddy content which were the remains of food, apparently from the last supper on behalf of the deceased.

=== Case 4 ===
Between cases 3 and 4 stands an enormous burial jar from the tomb (literally a grave circle) of Agios Ioannis, Papoulia. The burial jars were arranged radially around a horseshoe-shaped construction in the middle of the tumulus, possibly serving as a cenotaph. Next to the jar is a two-eared hydria from the same tumulus, dating from the Early Helladic or Middle Helladic period.

Case 4 contains grave goods from the tombs of the Kefalovryso group at Volimidia. Among these items is a pottery type mentioned in Homer as a two-handled cup. It is a composite vessel, consisting of two drinking cups connected on the rim with a small handle and on the belly with a small tube. The case also contains two containers of unknown function. Marinatos suggested that one of them is a dimiteus which is an object that helps divide weaving threads.

Case 4 also contains pottery from Tragana-Voroulia, dated to the Late Helladic I period including Keftiu cups. The term Keftiu is derived from Egyptian texts, where it denotes a particular nation, which Egyptologists identified as the Minoans from Crete. Most of the pottery vessels on this shelf were discovered in a storage building, where pottery of various periods was stored. Near to case 4 stands an amphora with a depiction of an octopus from Tholos tomb II at Routsi.

=== Case 9 ===
Case 9 contains the finds from the "gold-bearing" tombs of Peristeria, excavated by Marinatos in 1965. There is a golden diadem and two cups of the keftiu type that are golden with embossed spiral motives, from tholos tomb 3. These items resemble those found in the Royal pit tombs of Mycenae. There are also smaller items, such as golden bees, tassels, discs, lamellae and leaves. At the back side of the case is a representation of the floor of the Throne Room at the Palace of Nestor.

=== Case 5 ===
Case 5 contains more items from the grave circle of Peristeria, including an early figurine from Messenia representing a female figure in a long dress. Her bosom is naked and she prays in the Petsofas position of the Middle Minoan period.

Case 5 also contains finds from the tholos tombs of Viglitsa, Tragana, dated to the 17th century BC. Among the items from this tomb were three pithoid amphorae with floral decorations consisting of lilies and ivy leaves and a squeezed bronze two-eared vessel.

=== Case 6–8 ===
Cases 6, 7, and 8 contain finds from the extensive Volimidia cemetery. Case 6 displays items from the Kefalovryso and Koroniou tomb groups including a large beaker (or stamnos) decorated with double axes, similar to those found in Royal pit I of Mycenae.

In case 7, there is a flask with concentric circles, a figurine of a bovine, a Mycenaean figurine of the Ψ type, and Roman items made of terra sigillata.

Case 8 contains exhibits from chamber tombs 1, 2, 4, 5, 9, and 10 of the Angelopoulos group at Volimidia. Tomb 4 contained items of the Mycenaean period, as well as a large number of pottery and glass artifacts of the Roman period. Tomb 5 contained items of the late Helladic and Protogeometric periods, including two medium-sized jugs, one decorated with a maeander design, and a copper double axe.

== Room 2 ==
The second central room of the Museum is dedicated to the Palace of Nestor and the hill of Englianos.

=== Case 10 ===
Case 10 contains large stemmed beakers, kylikes, kraters and ladles from pantry 20 of the Palace of Nestor. Case 19 also contains pottery and drinking vessels from pantry 20, as well as some pottery from room 38, including stripes for sealing jars. One krater is mattpainted with wavy decoration, similar to a krater from the excavations at Vlachopoulo that is displayed in the museum of Pylos. There is also a stone oil lamp of Minoan origin made of white marble and decorated with spiral patterns.

=== Cases 11, 12, 17, and 18: The wallpainting cases ===
Cases 11, 12, 17 and 18 contain fragments of the palace's wall paintings. On the walls over the cases there are painting recreations of the wall paintings by Piet de Jong. Jong was an architect and designer with the British School at Athens, who worked on several Mycenaean and Minoan sites.

Case 11 contains fragments from the backfilling of the palace vestibule which depict hunting dogs. There are also fragments of wall paintings from the room of the Queen, which depict lions and griffins.

In case 12, the fragments depict male figures from the vestibule of the palace of Nestor, a man leading dogs and another man carrying tripods. There is a frieze with nautilus-shells from corridor number 48 and a façade of a building decorated with consecration horns, a typical cult symbol of the Minoans, from the courtyards south of the vestibule.

Case 17 contains more painting fragments including rosettes (from staircase 54), a battle scene over a river (from vestibule 64), and lyre player who was probably the last figure on a large wallpainting depicting a procession. The lyre player alludes to Apollo and to Thamyris, a musician from Pylia, who boasted about his musical prowess and therefore was punished by the muses (Iliad, 2 594–600).

In case 18 there are a collection of painting fragments showing a female head named “The White Goddess”, nautilus shells, blue birds, and a bull-leaper that was found in a pit in the floor of the wine magazine.

=== Cases 32 and 33 ===
Case 32 contains miniature kylikes, possibly used for ritual purposes, as well as replicas of Linear B tablets. Two golden Venetian coins suggest that the hilltop of Englianos was used as a quarry for building materials in a later period. In case 33 there are fragments of jewellery and golden lamellae.

=== Cases 13–15 ===
These cases all contain pottery found in the palace's pantries. Case 13 displays jars from storeroom 32, case 14 contains drinking cups, scoops and bowls from pantry 60, and case 15 has similar items from pantry 18. The items in these cases include cooking pots, stemmed kylikes, scoops and ladles, probably used for cooking, drinking and feasting.

=== Free-standing displays ===
Room 2 contains several items that are not in cases. There are two free-standing, large amphorae for storing goods. One is decorated with a checkerboard pattern. The other is a Minoan-style clay table of offerings found next to the hearth in the throne room. In the middle of the room is a model of the palace, donated by a Dutch highschool.

== Room 3 ==
The third room contains exhibits from the palace as well as from the broader region of Englianos.

=== Cases 20–23: The lower town ===
Case 20 contains finds from Kokkevis' chamber and protogeometric tombs at Chora. These finds include amphoras, a krater with a depiction of a hunting scene, and a stemmed open cup or bowl with a linear white decoration, reminiscent of pottery from Early Modern Greece. There are also grave goods from Tsakalis' chamber tombs and from the tholos tomb 4 of Kanakaris including a copper bowl with long rectangular handles, a feeding bottle, a female figurine, necklaces of gold or semi-precious stones, and a set for personal care containing a razor and two mirrors.

Case 21 is dedicated to finds from the lower town and Tsakalis tombs. A conical rhyton decorated with palm trees and nilotic floral motives in a Minoan style. The case also contains a stirrup jar with an ivy-leaf decoration, a prochous with the same floral pattern and two tall Keftiu cups with a spiral decoration.

Case 22 contains pottery from the Palace's pantries and from the dumps of the acropolis including cups, kyathoi, kraters and some beveled jugs.

Case 23 contains pottery items which were blackened and deformed by the fire which consumed the Palace, as well as grave goods from the pit grave in room 97. The grave goods include Carnelian, amethyst, and gold beads, and another golden bead in the form of a warrior's head.

=== Cases 24, 25: The palace's pantries ===
Case 24 contains storage vessels from the palace's pantry 68, workshop 55, and wine magazine 105 including a brazier made of clay. Case 25 contains two types of pots, tripod cookpots and clay shovels for charcoal. Some of the items are blackened by fire. In addition to the cases, there is a large ringed jar with a lid that was used for storage of goods, such as oil, and a clay pipe and basin-shaped lid which formed part of the chimney above the hearth in the Queen's apartments.

=== Case 26: The aromatic oil ===
Case 26 contains well-preserved stirrup jars which were the most typical vessels for transporting good quality aromatic oil.

=== Cases 27 and 28 ===
Case 27 contains mainly drinking vessels, such as stemmed drinking cups, and some deformed and burned items including an askos. Case 28 contains daily use pottery, such as bowls, basins, scoops and sauce-boat, and twists for making Linear B tablets.

=== Case 29: Burial customs ===
Case 29 contains finds and grave goods from Vayenas Tholos tomb 5 which is actually a grave circle. The items from this tomb belonged mainly to warriors but a few suggest at least one female burial. The items include Late Helladic pottery, prochoi, a three-eared amphora, a pair of copper scales, a personal care set made of copper and ivory, sheaths for daggers which apparently formed part of a Mycenean warrior's armour, and a large number of daggers and swords, some of which are bent. The bent swords allude to the fact that their owners, former warriors, will never again need them.

=== Cases 30 and 31 ===
Case 30 contains pottery sherds, small copper daggers and parts of an ivory helmet. In case 31 is a miniature ring prochous as well as a set of pestles.

=== Free-standing displays ===
Free-standing exhibits include a pithos and a large copper basin with handles ending in a human hand shape from the Vayenas grave circle, and large consecration horns.

== Bibliography ==
- Blegen, C., Rawson, M., et al., The Palace of Nestor at Pylos in Western Messenia, v. I-III, Princeton 1966-1973
- Davis, J., A Guide to the Palace of Nestor, the Myenaean Sites in its Environs and the Museum of Hora, ASCSA 2001
- Marinatos, Sp., Anaskafai Messenias 1952–1966, ed. Sp. Iakovides, Athens: Archaeological Society at Athens 2014
