= Chora, Messenia =

Chora Χώρα
- Community
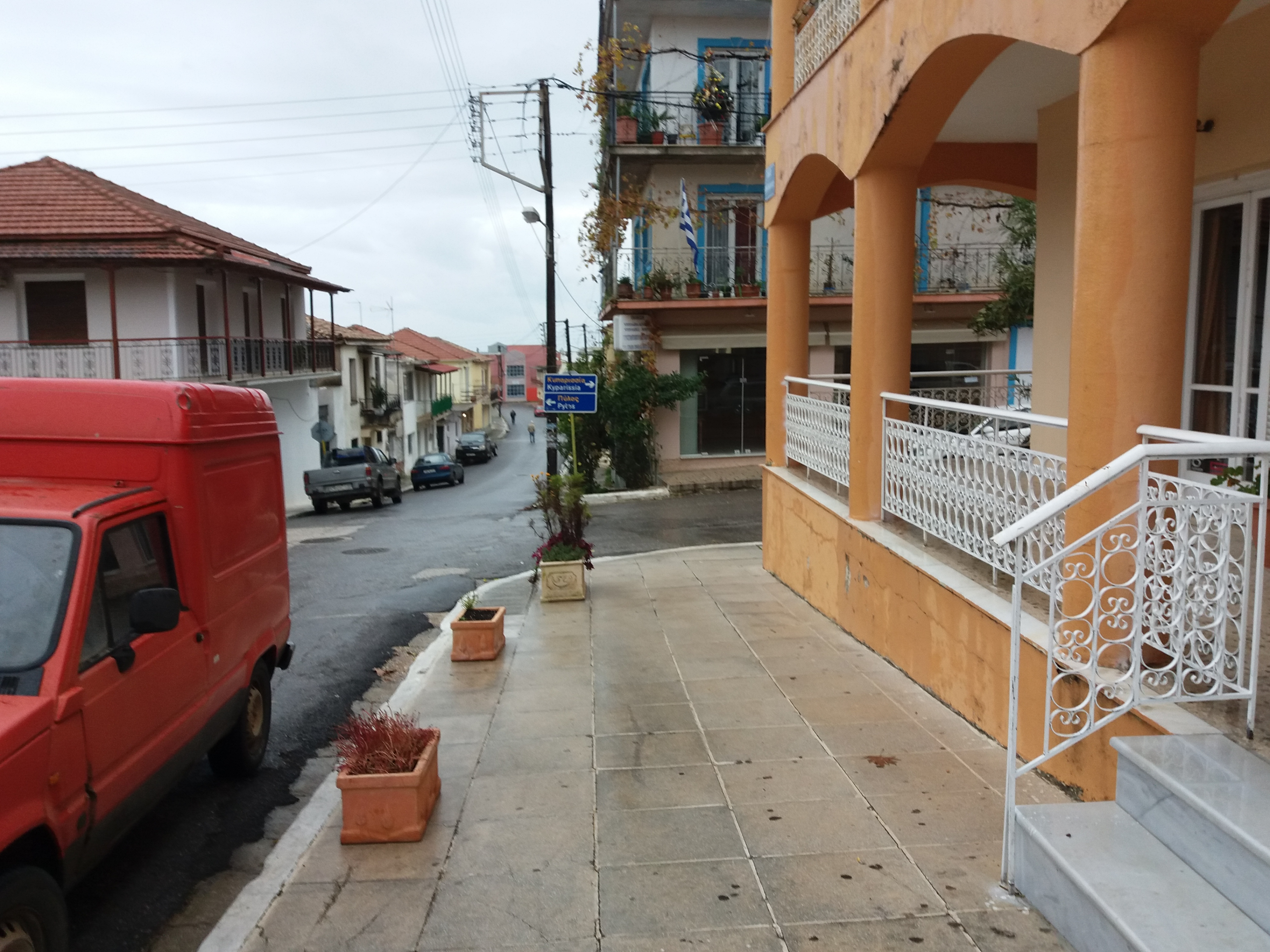
- Main road in Chora

- Location within Greece
- Coordinates: 37°5′N 21°45′E
- Country: Greece
- Administrative region: Peloponnese
- Regional unit: Messenia
- Municipality: Pylos-Nestor
- Municipal unit: Nestoras
- Elevation: 294 m (965 ft)

Population (2021)
  - Community: 2,609
- Time zone: UTC+2 (EET)
  - Summer (DST): UTC+3 (EEST)
- Postal code: 24600
- Website: Municipality of Pylos-Nestoras

Chora is a small town in the western part of Messenia, in the Peloponnese region of southern Greece. With a population of 2,609 inhabitants as of 2021, it is the largest settlement in the municipality of Pylos-Nestoras and the sixth largest settlement in Messenia. Chora is renowned for its long history. It houses an archeological museum and it is located 3 kilometers away from the Palace of Nestor.

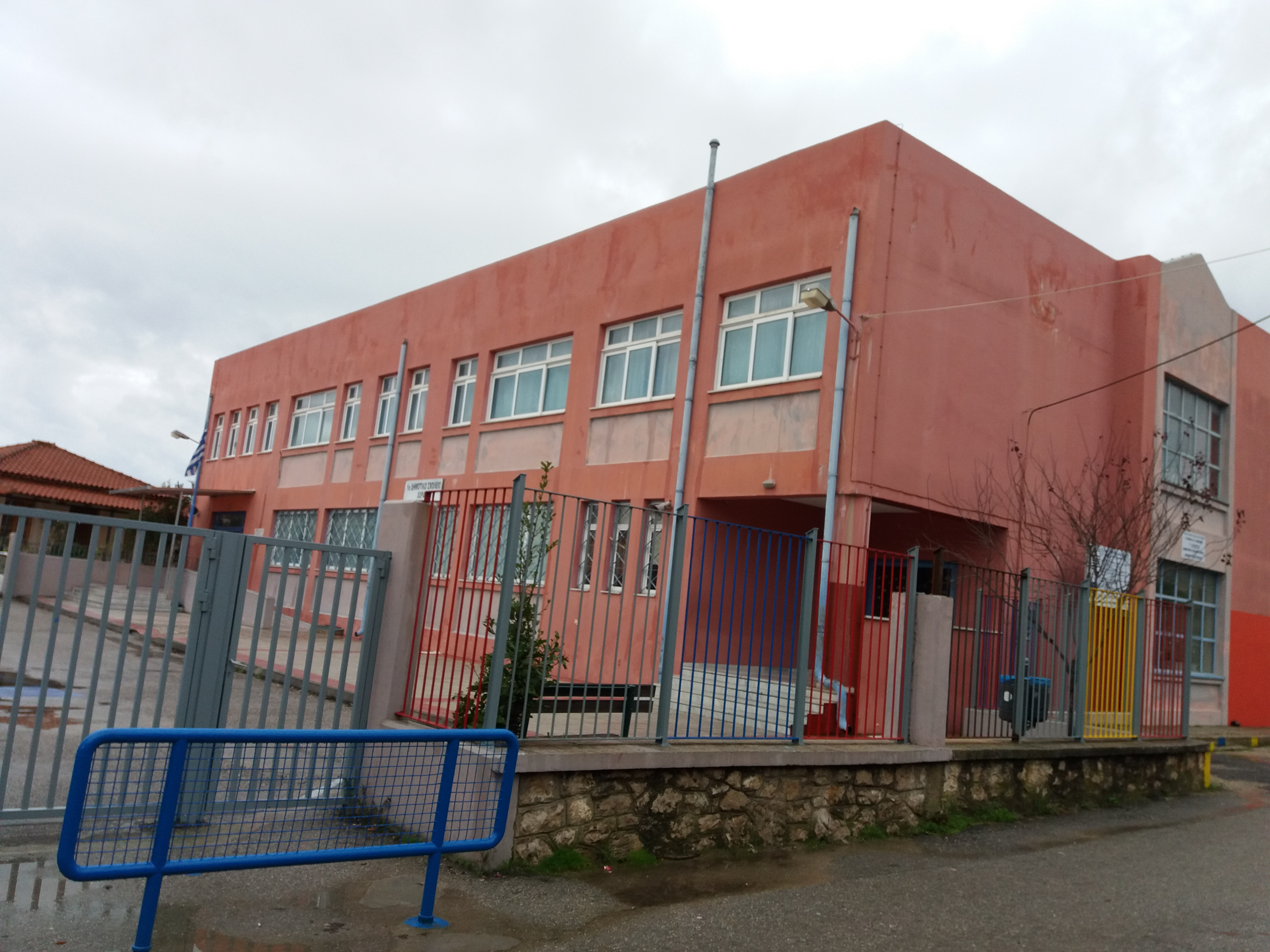
The 1st. primary school

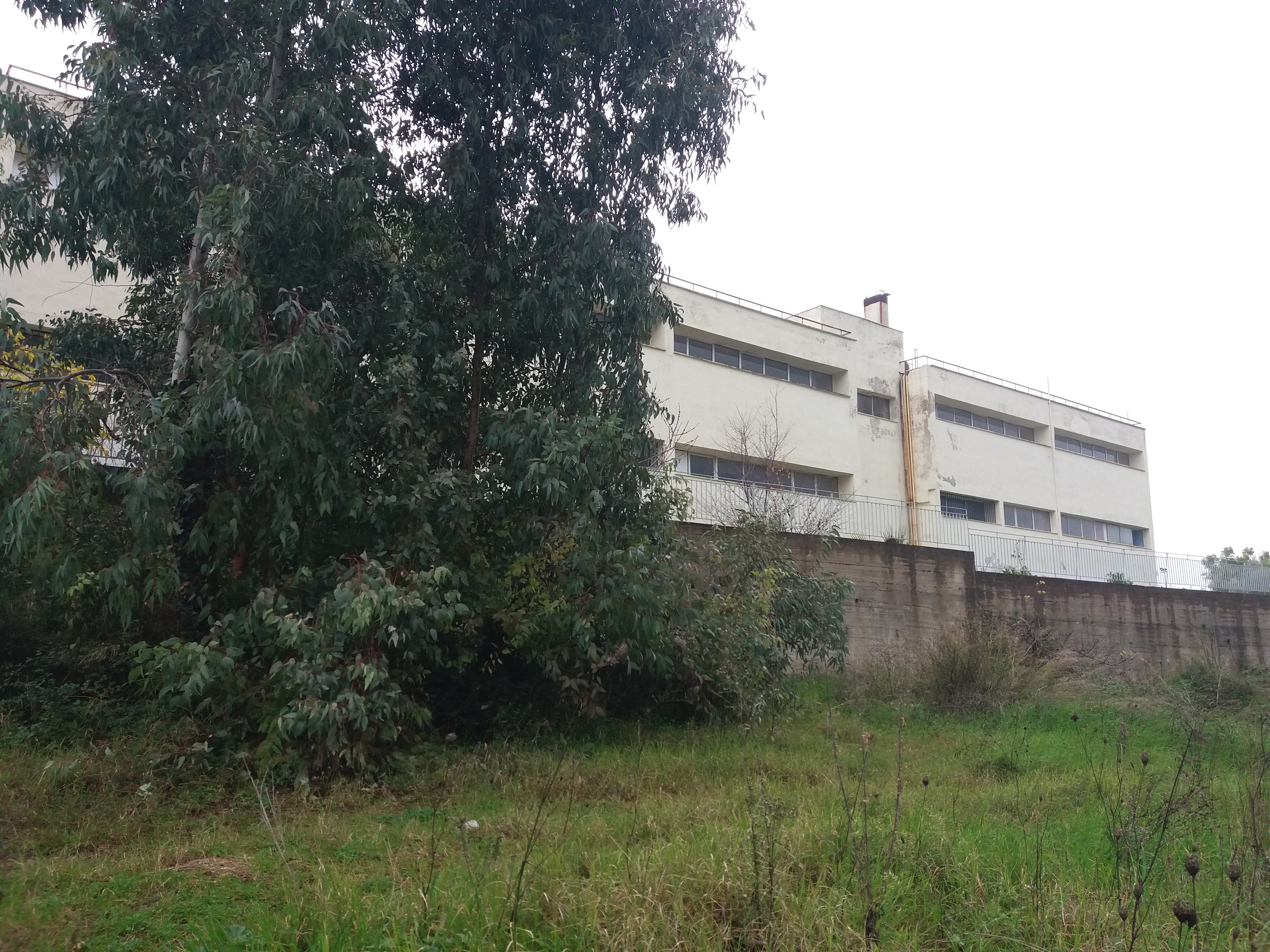
The secondary school

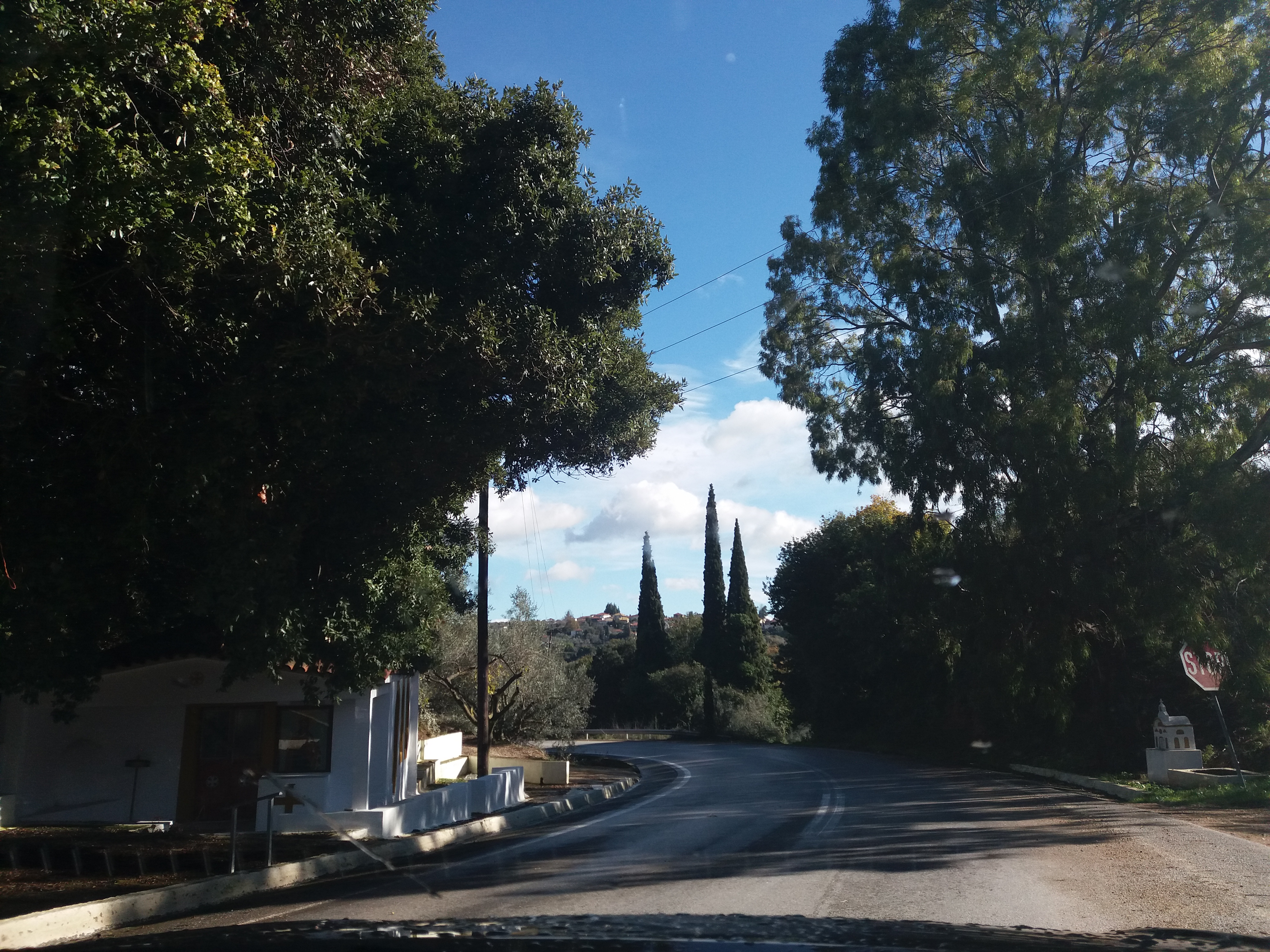
The chapel of St. Kyriaki

== Location ==
Chora is located in the southwestern part of Greece, in the peripheral unit of Messinia in Greece. It is 273 kilometers away from Athens, 205 kilometers away from Patras and 55 kilometers away from Kalamata. It has an altitude of 294 meters and it is built on the foothills of Aigaleo Mountain and 12 kilometers away from the Ionian Sea. Chora is 10 kilometers away from Gargalianoi and 21 kilometers away from Pylos. Romanos beach, Divari beach and the world-famous Voidokilia beach are located near the town.

== History ==
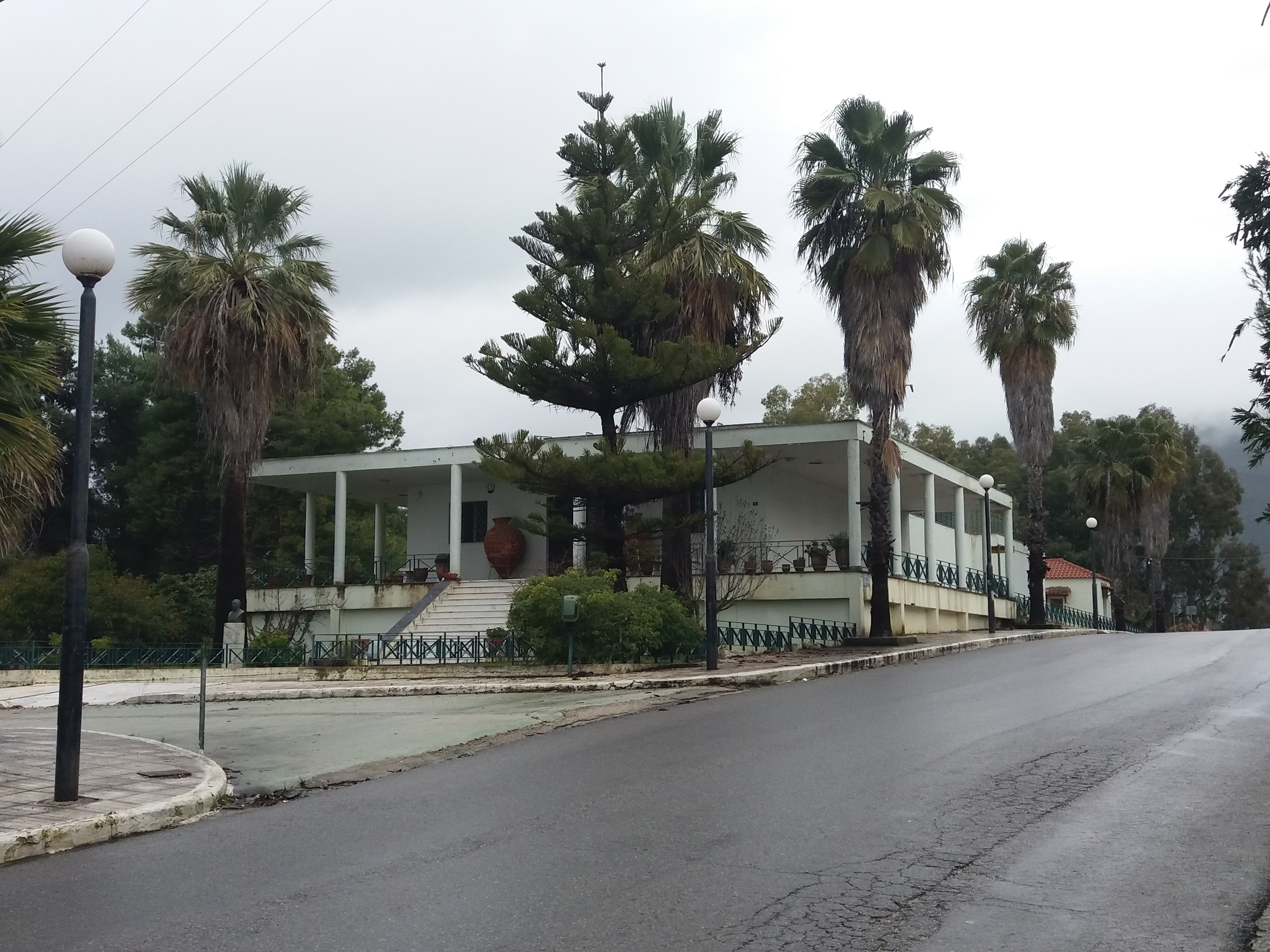
The archeological museum

Chora is associated with Ancient Pylos, one of the most important Mycenaean kingdoms, that took part in the Trojan War, with Nestor as its king. Ruins of the Palace of Nestor have been discovered 3 kilometers away from the town. It is the best preserved Mycenaean palace and one of the most important archeological sites in Greece. Excavations executed by Carl Blegen led to the discovery of the complex between 1932 and 1952. It is thought to have been a two-storey building with store rooms, workshops, baths, light wells, reception rooms and a sewage system. The building was in use until 1200 BC, when it was destroyed due to a fire. The archeological site was closed for renovation and has reopened since 2016. Tourists can admire the foundations of the building, together with the Throne Room and main storage areas.

Excavations in Chora have led to the discovery of an ancient cemetery in northern part of the town (Volimidia). This necropolis consists of more than 30 chamber tombs. Beehive tombs can be found in the southern part of the town and particularly in the olive grove of Englianos.

In modern times, the Battle of Chora-Agorelitsa took place in the southern end of the town, close to the village of Ampelophyto, on June 19, 1944. The Greek People's Liberation Army managed to defeat a phalanx of the 3rd Reich.

== Main sites and services ==
Chora is a commercial, administrative and cultural center of the region and provides all the amenities of a modern town. Cafés, restaurant and a large number of stores are located in the main square. There is a hotel in the northern end of the town. The town houses administrative buildings, a medical center, a post office, a bank, a municipal cinema and a football stadium. There are two nursery schools, two primary schools, a secondary school and a lyceum. The town cathedral is dedicated to Saint George. There are totally three parishes, with the other two churches being dedicated to Saint Nicolas and the Holy Apostoles. There are numerous chapels, such as the Byzantine chapel of Saint Constantine and the chapel of the Transfiguration of Jesus. A large church is dedicated to the patron saint of Chora, Saint Demetrios of Chora that lived in the town in the late 18th century.

== Museum ==
The Archaeological Museum of Chora is situated in the center of the town. It was established in 1969 and it houses important Mycenaean artifacts that have been found in the wider region. Exhibitions include golden jewelry, pottery, frescoes etc.

== Events ==
"Nestoria" are organized every summer for over 40 years. They are a series of cultural celebrations, including a running race, a danse festival organized by the Cultural Association of Chora, music concerts and theater plays. Chora hosts the oldest and largest commercial fair in Messinia to celebrate its patron saint every October. Apart from religious services, there is a large flea market and a food market.
