= Enkhelyawon =

Wealthy noble from Mycenaean Greece, possibly a king

Enkhelyawon (Mycenaean Greek: 𐀁𐀐𐁈𐀺, e-ke-rja-wo) (Note: rja stands for the *76 or ra_{2} Linear B sign. Enkhelyawon or Enkheljāwōn is a possible yet uncertain reconstruction of the name. The attested forms of this word - though there are also other attested words that could possibly be variants thereof - are 𐀁𐀐𐁈𐀺, e-ke-rja-wo (thought to be the nominative case form), 𐀁𐀐𐁈𐀺𐀜, e-ke-rja-wo-no (thought to be the genitive form), and 𐀁𐀐𐁈𐀺𐀚, e-ke-rja-wo-ne (thought to be the dative form), found respectively, on the PY Un 718, PY An 610 and PY An 724 tablets.) was possibly a Mycenaean king from Pylos in the 13th century BCE.

Enkhelyawon is known from Linear B records from Pylos. He was very important and owned great estates, including good farm land, a thousand grapevines and a thousand fig trees; he also had forty men serving as rowers in the fleet. Because of this it is assumed that he was a king - Mycenaean Greek: wanax; Linear B: 𐀷𐀙𐀏, wa-na-ka; later Greek: ἄναξ, anax - and that he ruled over Pylos. But as kings are only mentioned by their title in texts of Linear B, it is not possible to conclusively prove this theory.

== See also ==
- Palace of Nestor

== Notes and references ==
Notes

== Sources ==
- Schofield, Louise (2009). Mykene. Geschichte und Mythos (in German). Mainz am Rhein: Verlag Philipp von Zabern. p. 120. ISBN 978-3-8053-3943-8.
