= Venetiko =

Small uninhabited Greek island

Βενέτικο
- Location of Venetiko island

Geography
- Location: Mediterranean Sea
- Coordinates: 36°41′45.43″N 21°53′15.04″E
- Archipelago: Messenian Oinousses

Administration
- Greece
- Region: Peloponnese
- Regional unit: Messenia

Demographics
- Population: 0 (2020)
- Pop. density: 0/km^{2} (0/sq mi)

Venetiko (Greek: Βενέτικο), is a small uninhabited Greek island off the southern coast of the Peloponnese, south of the Cape Akritas. It belongs to the cluster of the Messenian Oinousses. It is administratively part of the municipality of Pylos-Nestor, in Messenia. During ancient times, it was called Theganoussa (Ancient Greek: Θηγανοῦσσά) and it is mentioned by the Pomponius Mela, Pliny the Elder, Pausanias and Ptolemaeus.

Though Pausanias calls it an uninhabited island, archaeological evidence suggests that it was once occupied.

It is included in the Natura 2000.
