= Nestoras =

Nestoras Δήμος Νέστορος
- Municipal unit
- Location within the regional unit

- Location within Greece
- Coordinates: 37°02′N 21°42′E
- Country: Greece
- Administrative region: Peloponnese
- Regional unit: Messenia
- Municipality: Pylos-Nestor

Area
  - Municipal unit: 91.9 km^{2} (35.5 sq mi)

Population (2021)
  - Municipal unit: 3,765
  - Municipal unit density: 41.0/km^{2} (106/sq mi)
- Time zone: UTC+2 (EET)
  - Summer (DST): UTC+3 (EEST)
- Vehicle registration: ΚΜ

Nestoras (Greek: Δήμος Νέστορος) is a former municipality in Messenia, Peloponnese, Greece. Since the 2011 local government reform it is part of the municipality Pylos-Nestor, of which it is a municipal unit. The municipal unit has an area of 91.902 km^{2}. Population 3,765 (2021). The seat of the municipality was in Chora.
