= Messenian Oinousses =

Group of islands in Greece

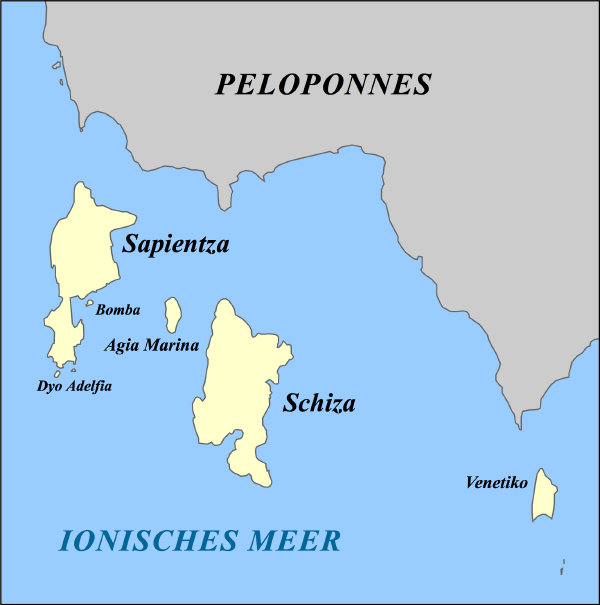

- Location within Greece

Geography
- Coordinates: 36.70°N 21.61°E
- Total islands: 7

Administration
- Greece
- Region: Peloponnese
- Regional unit: Messenia

Demographics
- Population: 2 (2011)

Messenian Oinousses (Greek: Μεσσηνιακές Οινούσσες, romanized: Messiniakés Inoússes) is a Greek island complex in the southwest coasts of Peloponnese, in Ionian Sea. It is located to the south of Messenian peninsula, opposite Methoni and Foinikounda. The archipelago comprises the islands Schiza and Sapientza and the islets and rocks Venetiko, Agia Mariani, Avgo, Dyo Aderfia and Boba. The largest island is Schiza, whereas the only populated island is Sapientza. To the southwest of Oinousses is the deepest point of the Mediterranean Sea, the Calypso Deep, also known as the Oinousses Deep or the Vavilov Deep. Oinousses has been included in the environmental program Natura 2000. The islands belong to Pylos-Nestor municipality.

== Main islands ==
Island	Area (Km^{2})	Population (2011)
Schiza	12.3	0
Sapientza	9.0	2
Venetiko	1.2	0
