= Schiza =

Island in Greece

Native name: Σχίζα
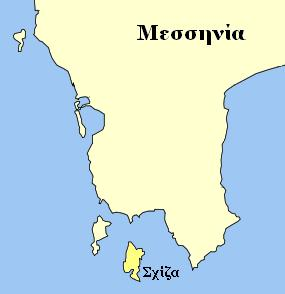

Geography
- Coordinates: 36°43′38″N 21°46′08″E
- Archipelago: Messenian Oinousses
- Area: 12.3 km^{2} (4.7 sq mi)

Administration
- Greece
- Region: Peloponnese
- Regional unit: Messenia
- Municipality: Pylos-Nestor

Demographics
- Population: 0 (2011)

Schiza (Greek: Σχίζα) is a Greek island off the southwestern coast of the Peloponnese. According to 2011 census, the island is uninhabited. Administratively it is part of the municipality of Pylos-Nestor in Messenia. It is the largest island of the Messenian Oinousses, an island complex that consists of two main islands (Schiza and Sapientza) and few rocky islets. Its area is 12.3 Km^{2}. Schiza along with other Messenian Oinousses have been included in the Natura 2000 Network, with code GR2550003.
