= Siege of Chania (1645) =

- Part of the Cretan War (Fifth Ottoman–Venetian War)
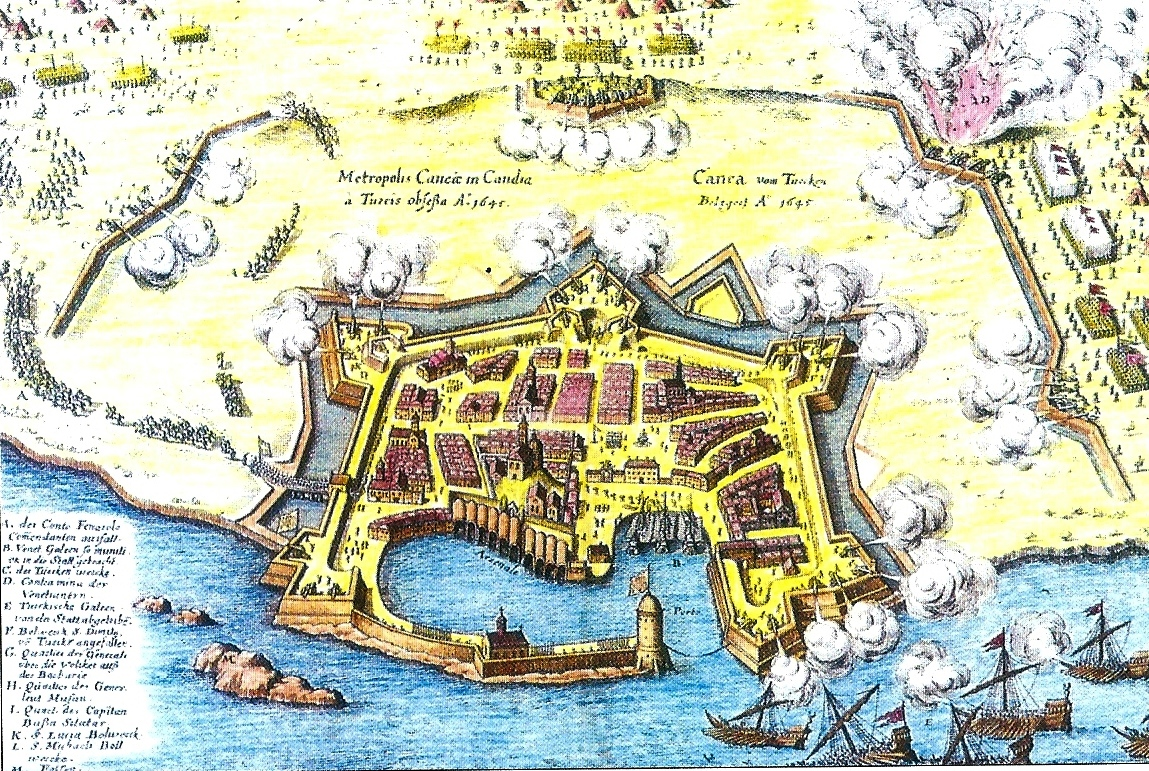
- Siege of Chania in 1645
Date	27 June – 22 August 1645
Location	Chania, Crete
Result	Ottoman victory

Belligerents
Ottoman Empire; Ottoman Tripolitania; Ottoman Tunis	Republic of Venice

Commanders and leaders
Silahdar Yusuf Pasha	Unknown

Strength
50,000 men: 7,000 Janissaries; 14,000 Siphais; 3,000 sapper; Thousands of Timariots	12,000

Casualties and losses
Unknown	Unknown; 12 ships captured

The siege of Chania happened during the initial stages of Cretan War (1645–1669). The Ottomans besieged the Venetian-held city of Chania, and after 56 days of siege, the Ottomans captured the city.

== Background ==
The Ottoman armada set sail from Istanbul on 30 April 1645. Led by Silahdar Yusuf Pasha, the armada had 416 ships, including ships rented from Dutch and English, and reportedly 50,000 men, including 7,000 janissaries. The Ottoman armada stopped at the Venetian island of Tinos for watering and supplies, they sailed and stopped at Navarino for three weeks. The Venetians thought the Ottomans were heading for Malta. The Tripolitan and Tunisian fleets joined the Ottomans. Yusuf then revealed the true campaign target to his men, Crete. The Ottomans set sail on June 21 and arrived two days later in the bay of Chania, beginning the war for Crete.

The Ottomans achieved their first victory by capturing the island of Agioi Theodoroi. The island was defended by Blasio Zulian and 30 men with poor cannons. The small Venetian garrison sunk 2 Ottoman ships. Blasio then set up mines on the fort, blowing himself up, his men, and the fortress to pieces, allowing the Ottomans to capture the fort.

== Siege ==
The Ottomans then advanced both by land and sea towards Chania. They arrived there on 27 June, encamping on the hillsides facing the city and taking over the harbor. The Ottomans landed 7,000 janissaries, 14,000 Siphais, 3,000 sappers, and thousands of Timariots. The Venetian garrison consisted of 12,000 men, an inadequately recruited militia. The Ottomans began unloading their cannons, munitions, and supplies, and they commenced the siege. A barricade was established on Constantine Hill, and Rumelia Beylerbeyi Hasan Pasha and the Kruševac, Vlorë and İlbasan Sanjakbeys entered the barricade with seven cannon batteries and Janissaries of Murad Ağa. The most intense fighting took place on July 9, when the Ottoman led by Hassan Agha, who fell in battle, routed the Venetians and killed more than 50 of them, and on July 17 when some of the Venetian soldiers escaped during the battle into the sea were killed and captured. The Venetians made a brave but unfruitful defense of the city which lasted for 56 days. The Venetians surrendered to the Ottomans on August 22. The Venetians were allowed the leave for Souda unharmed, and four days later the Ottomans occupied the city, converting Church of Saint Nicholas and two other Churches to mosques. The Ottomans also captured 12 galleys in arsenal. Yusuf then garrisoned the city with 8,000 men.

== Aftermath ==
The news reached Istanbul and the city held three days of celebrations with cannons. The news of Chania's fall reached Zakynthos on August 30 just as Tuscan, Spanish, Papal, and Maltese fleets were about to set sail to rescue the city. A vigorous attack on Chania would have saved Crete from the Ottomans; however, the Christian forces were under the papal captain-general Niccolo Ludovisi, who ordered a retreat towards Souda. The Christian forces attacked Chania on October 1 but failed.

== Sources ==
- Kenneth Meyer Setton (1991), Venice, Austria, and the Turks in the seventeenth century.
- Anderson, R.C (1952), Naval wars in the Levant, 1559–1853.
- Gábor Ágoston (2021), The Last Muslim Conquest, The Ottoman Empire and Its Wars in Europe.
- Nicholas Morton (2019), The Military Orders Volume VII, Piety, Pugnacity and Property.
- Hasan Ali Cengiz (2018), GİRİT'İN FETHİNE IŞIK TUTAN BİR ESER: TEVÂRÎH-İ CEZÎRE-İ GİRİD * A work that sheds light on the conquest of Crete.
