= Sapientza =

Island in Greece

Native name: Σαπιέντζα
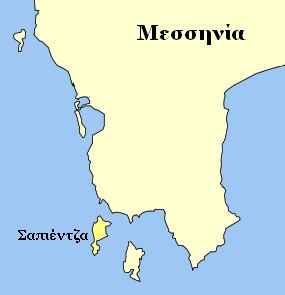

Geography
- Coordinates: 36°46′18.3″N 21°42′18.1″E
- Archipelago: Messenian Oinousses
- Area: 9 km^{2} (3.5 sq mi)

Administration
- Greece
- Region: Peloponnese
- Regional unit: Messenia

Demographics
- Population: 2 (2011)
- Pop. density: 0/km^{2} (0/sq mi)

Sapientza or Sapienza (Greek: Σαπιέντζα) is a Greek island off the southern coast of the Peloponnese, near the city of Methóni. It is administratively part of the municipality of Pylos-Nestor, in Messenia. The 2011 census reported a population of two inhabitants. Sapientza is the second largest island of the Messenian Oinousses, a small group island which consists of three small islands (Schiza, Sapientza and Agia Marina). Its name is of Italian origin and means wisdom. The Calypso Deep, the deepest point of the Mediterranean Sea at 5,267 metres (17,280 ft), is located south-west of Sapientza.

== Description ==
The island has seen many shipwrecks because it is located over the main sea route between Italy and the Middle East. Some of the wrecks carried important cargo, such as a Toman wreck that carried granite columns from the peristyle of Herod's temple in Caesarea Maritima. In the south of the island there is an important lighthouse built in 1885. Its height is 8 meters.

Sapientza has lush vegetation with dense shrubland and perennial hollies, arbutus and other Mediterranean plants. It is the only place in the world where the arbutus turn into trees, as they have also formed an entire forest known as ' Kumarodasos' which extends over 240 acres. For this reason, Sapientza and the other Messenian Oinousses have been included in the Natura 2000 Network, with code GR2550003.

On the island you can also find a large number of Kri-kri that live and breed there.

== History ==
Sapientza is known for the Treaty of Sapienza in 1209, between the Republic of Venice and the Principality of Achaea. With this treaty Methoni and Corone remained under Venetian rule and the remainder of the Peloponnese was ceded to Villehardouin. In 1354, the Venetian and Genoese fleets fought the Battle of Sapienza.

After the Greek War of Independence, Sapienza became a part of the Greek state. Nevertheless, the British claimed Sapienza during the Pacifico case, as part of the United States of the Ionian Islands.

Historical population
Year	Pop.	±%
1991	4	—
2001	7	+75.0%
2011	2	−71.4%
