= Messenia =

Messenia Περιφερειακή ενότητα Μεσσηνίας
- Regional unit
- Municipalities of Messenia

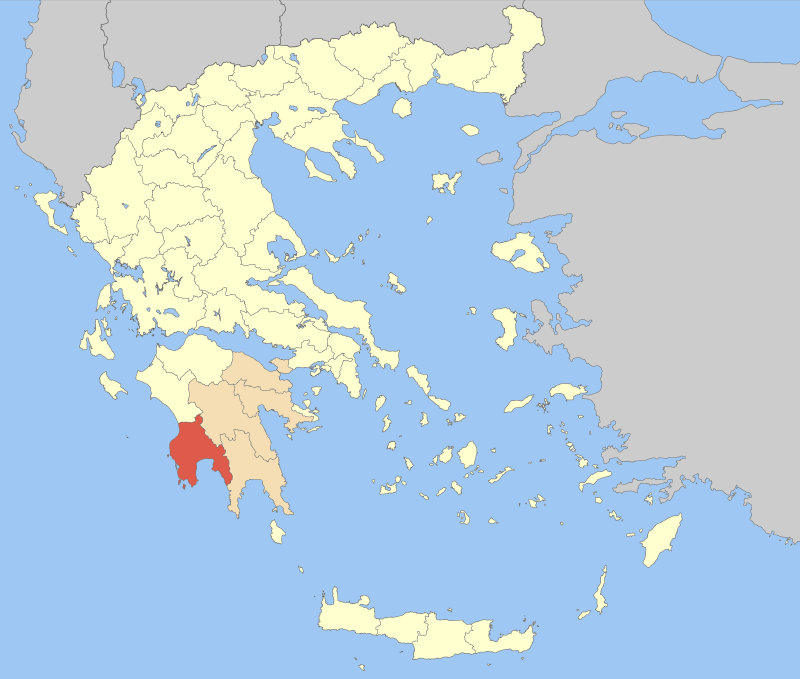
- Messenia within Greece

- Location within Greece
- Coordinates: 37°2′4″N 22°6′35″E
- Country: Greece
- Administrative region: Peloponnese
- Seat: Kalamata

Area
  - Total: 2,991 km^{2} (1,155 sq mi)

Population (2021)
  - Total: 146,080
  - Density: 48.84/km^{2} (126.5/sq mi)
- Time zone: UTC+2 (EET)
  - Summer (DST): UTC+3 (EEST)
- Postal code: 24x xx
- Area code: 272x0, 276x0
- Vehicle registration: ΚΜ

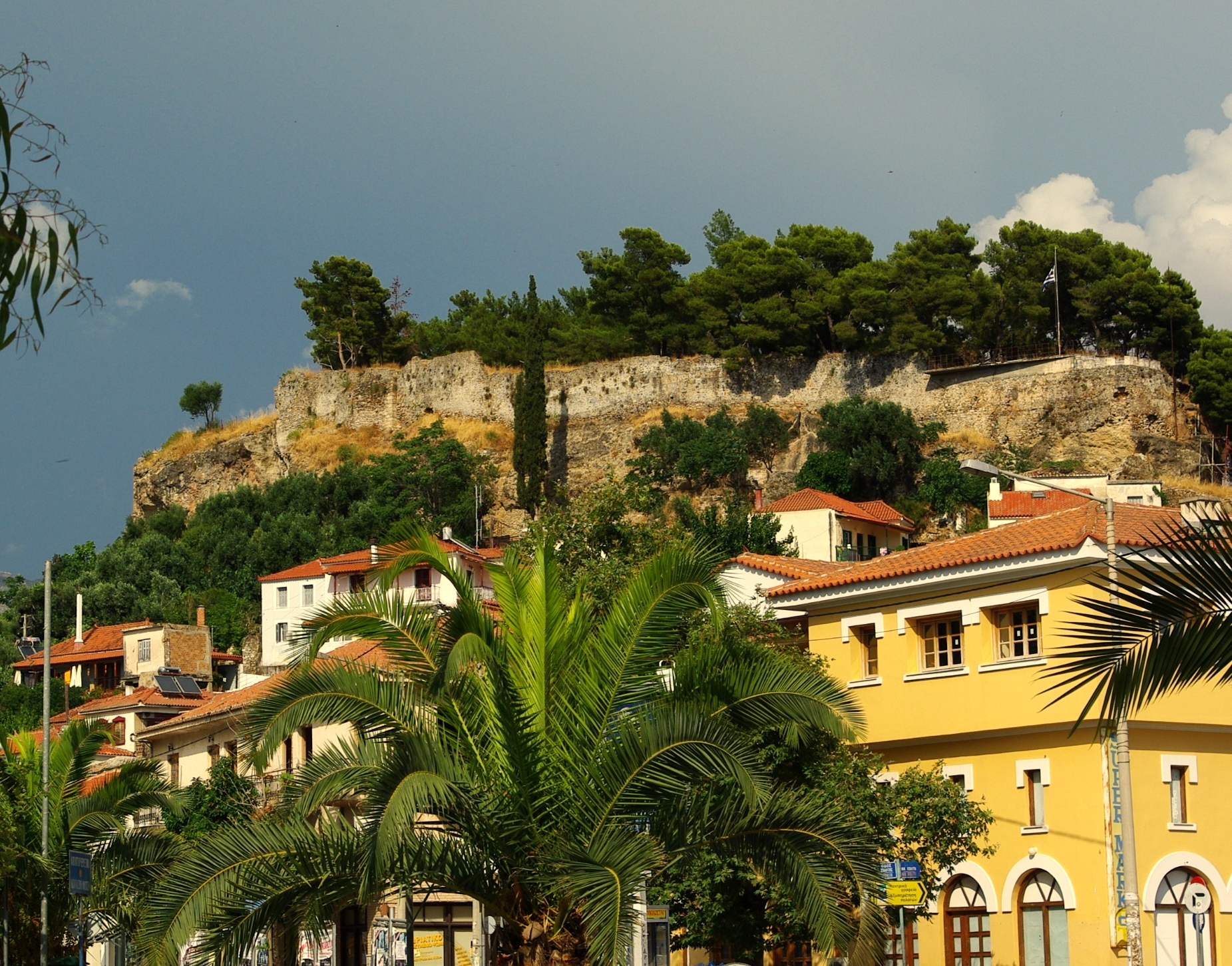
Kalamata castle

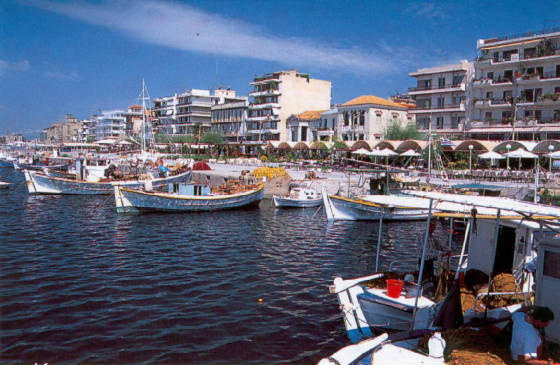
Port of Kalamata

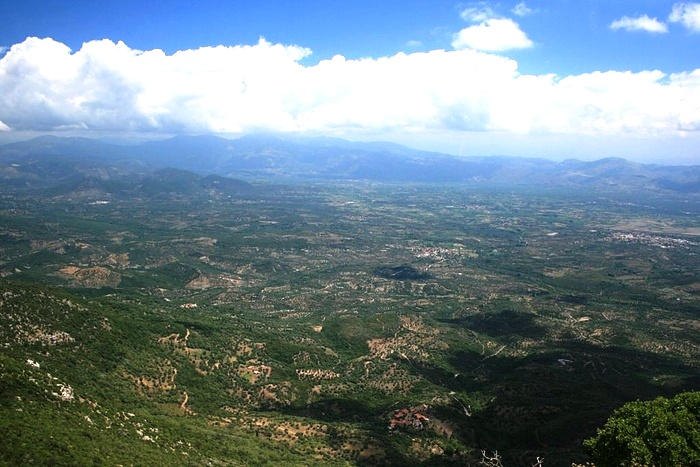
Messinia from Mt. Ithome

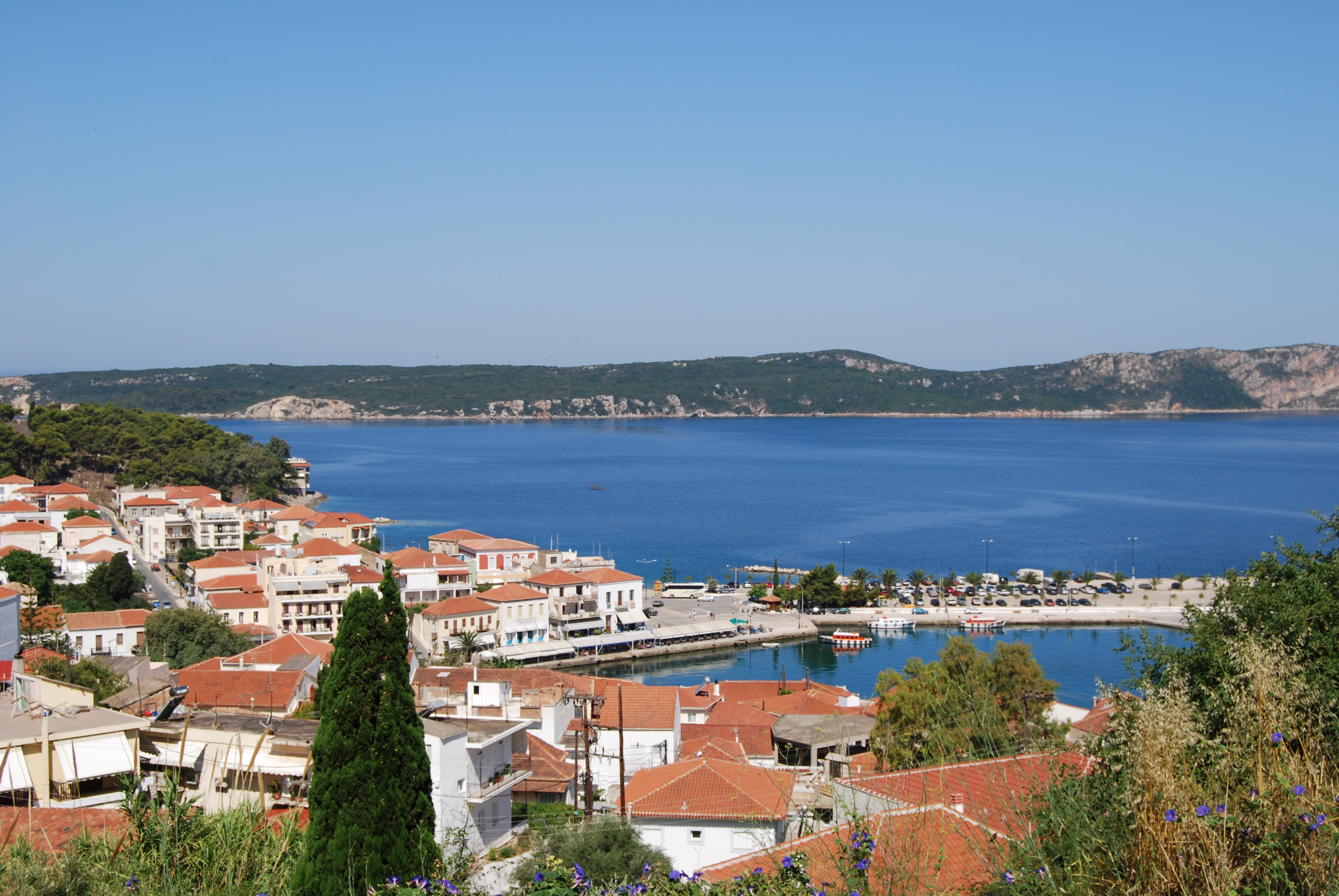
View of Pylos on the Bay of Navarino

Messenia or Messinia (/məˈsiːniə/ mə-SEE-nee-ə; Greek: Μεσσηνία [mesiˈni.a]) is a regional unit (perifereiaki enotita) in the southwestern part of the Peloponnese region, in Greece. Until the implementation of the Kallikratis plan on 1 January 2011, Messenia was a prefecture (nomos) covering the same territory. The capital and largest city of Messenia is Kalamata.

== Geography ==
=== Physical ===
Messenia borders on Elis to the north, Arcadia to the northeast, and Laconia to the southeast. The Ionian Sea lies to the west, and the Gulf of Messinia to the south. The most important mountain ranges are the Taygetus in the east, the Kyparissia mountains in the northwest and the Lykodimo in the southwest. The main rivers are the Neda in the north and the Pamisos in central Messenia.

Off the south coast of the southwesternmost point of Messenia lie the Messinian Oinousses islands. The largest of these are Sapientza, Schiza and Venetiko. The small island Sphacteria closes off the bay of Pylos. All these islands are virtually uninhabited.

Climate may vary, in the lowlands, temperatures are a bit warmer than Athens. Snow is not common during winter months except for the mountains, especially the Taygetus. Rain and clouds are common inland.

=== Political ===
==== Organization of Messenia ====
Before the 2010 reorganization, Messenia was a nomos (prefecture) containing 29 dimoi (municipalities) and 2 koinotites (communities). Since 2010, Messenia has been a perifereiake enoteta (regional unit) containing only 6 municipalities, but with the same population, as it did not change area in the reorganization. Some 25 municipalities and communities were incorporated politically into the other 6 according to the table below, becoming municipal units.

Municipality	Municipal unit	Seat
Kalamata	Kalamata	Kalamata
Kalamata	Aris	Kalamata
Kalamata	Arfara	Kalamata
Kalamata	Thouria	Kalamata
Messene (Messini)	Messene	Messene
Messene (Messini)	Aipeia	Messene
Messene (Messini)	Androusa	Messene
Messene (Messini)	Aristomenis	Messene
Messene (Messini)	Voufrades	Messene
Messene (Messini)	Ithomi	Messene
Messene (Messini)	Petalidi	Messene
Messene (Messini)	Trikorfo	Messene
Oichalia	Oichalia	Meligalas
Oichalia	Andania	Meligalas
Oichalia	Dorio	Meligalas
Oichalia	Eira	Meligalas
Oichalia	Meligalas	Meligalas
Pylos-Nestoras	Pylos	Pylos
Pylos-Nestoras	Koroni	Pylos
Pylos-Nestoras	Methoni	Pylos
Pylos-Nestoras	Nestoras	Pylos
Pylos-Nestoras	Papaflessas	Pylos
Pylos-Nestoras	Chiliochoria	Pylos
Trifylia	Kyparissia	Kyparissia
Trifylia	Aetos	Kyparissia
Trifylia	Avlonas	Kyparissia
Trifylia	Gargalianoi	Kyparissia
Trifylia	Filiatra	Kyparissia
Trifylia	Tripyla	Kyparissia
West Mani (Dytiki Mani)	Avia	Kardamyli
West Mani (Dytiki Mani)	Lefktro	Kardamyli

==== Provinces ====
The prefecture of Messenia was previously subdivided into four provinces (Greek: επαρχίες, "eparchies") :

- Province of Kalamon - Kalamata
- Province of Messini - Messine
- Province of Pylia - Pylos
- Province of Trifylia - Kyparissia

Like all provinces of Greece, they were abolished after the 2006 local elections, in line with Law 2539/1997, as part of the "Kapodistrias reform". Some of the enlarged municipalities (demoi) created in 2011 have a territory similar to the former provinces.

=== Population ===
Historical population
Year	Pop.	±%
1991	160,736	—
2001	166,566	+3.6%
2011	159,954	−4.0%
2021	146,080	−8.7%

The main cities and towns of Messenia are (ranked by 2021 census population):

- Kalamata 57,706
- Messini 5,744
- Kyparissia 4,893
- Gargalianoi 4,399
- Filiatra 4,373

== Economy ==
The economy of Messenia is primarily based on agricultural production although in recent years efforts are being made toward the development of activities in other sectors such as tourism.

Main agricultural products are olive oil, Kalamata table olives, figs, and black raisins (sultanas). The variety of agricultural products is complemented by a small amount of stockbreeding products (beef, milk, sfela cheese, honey) and fish from the Gulf of Messenia.

The tourist development observed is mainly attributable to the promotion of important archaeological sites, such as the Palace of Nestor, Ancient Messene, and the Venetian castles of Pylos, Koroni, Methoni and Kalamata, as well as to the beauty of the landscape. Another key factor for Messenia's economy is Costa Navarino a location on the border between Pylos and Trifylia, comprising several eco-friendly luxury resorts and golf courses, which is Greece's biggest tourist development.

There are many small- and medium-size firms involved in the processing and standardization of agricultural products as well as a number of enterprises devoted to wood processing, furniture manufacturing, and metal construction. The Karelia tobacco company is based in Kalamata.

=== Transport ===
The metre-gauge Corinth–Kalamata, Patras–Kyparissia and Zevgolatio–Kalo Nero railways used to run through Messenia, with train services from stations like Kalamata and Kyparissia towards Corinth and Patras: all train services in the regional unit were suspended indefinitely on 31 January 2011.

There are six main roads in the regional unit: the A7 motorway and EO7, towards Tripoli and Corinth; the EO9 and EO9a; the EO76, at the northern end of the unit; and the EO82, towards Sparta. In addition, the EO80 is an airport road to Triodos Airport, a former airbase now used for recreational flying.

The main airport in Messenia is Kalamata International Airport (KLX).

=== Communications ===
==== Television ====
- Notia Elliniki Teleorasi, (Southern Greece Television)
- Best TV,
- Mesogeios TV

== History ==
=== Ancient period ===
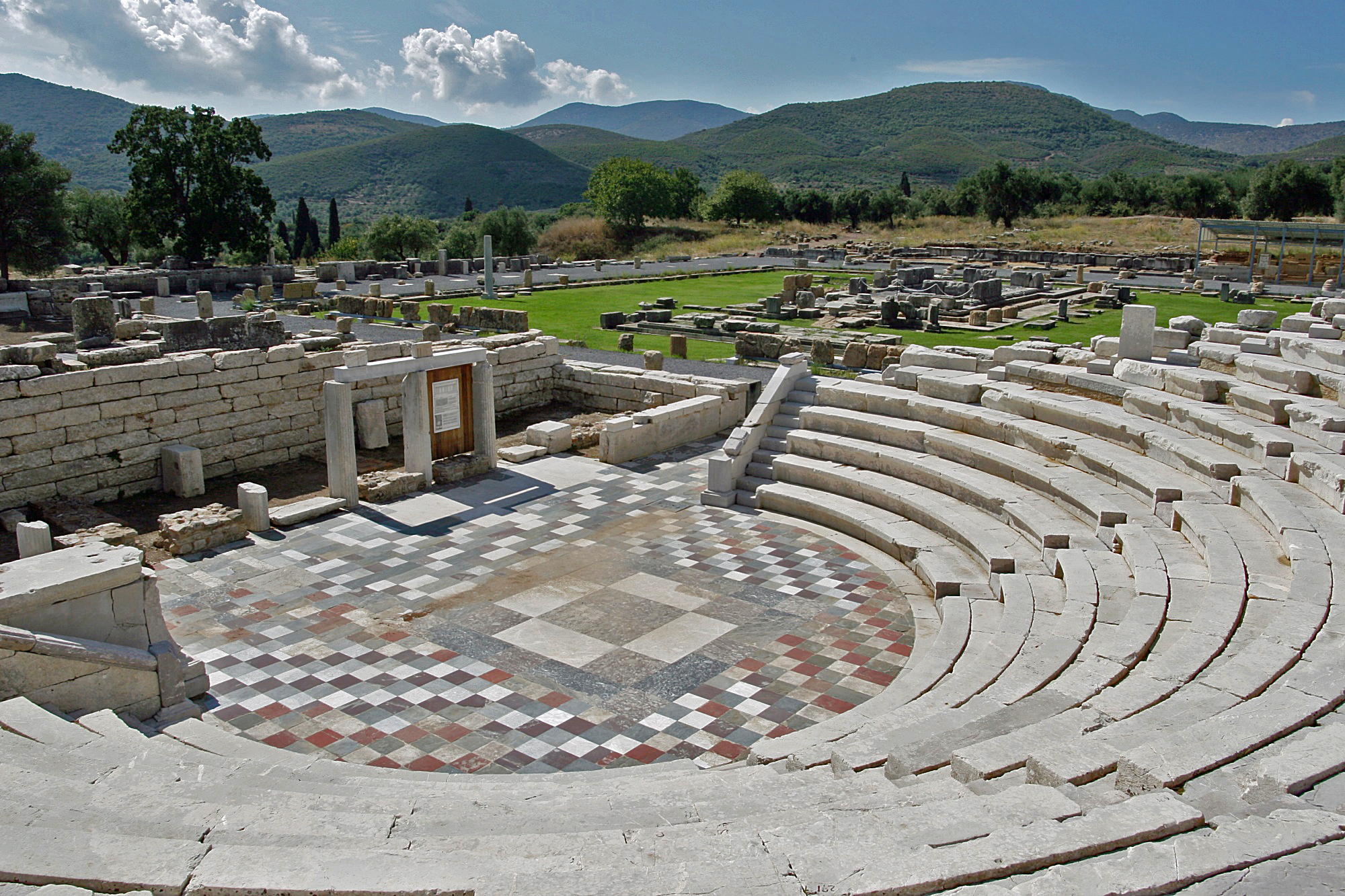
Ancient Theater in Messene.

While the name Messenia is not mentioned in the oldest work of European literature, the Iliad, several of the towns present there are, as the 7 cities offered by Agamemnon to Achilles to persuade him to return to battle. The name undoubtedly goes back to at least the Bronze Age, but its origins are lost in the world of mythology. The region was one of the largest that was conquered and enslaved as helots by ancient Sparta.

=== Medieval period ===
In the Middle Ages, Messenia shared the fortunes of the rest of the Peloponnese. Striking reminders of these conflicts are afforded by the extant ruins of the medieval strongholds of Kalamata, Coron (anc. Asine, mod. Koroni), Modon (Methoni) and Pylos. Messenia was a part of the Byzantine Empire until 1205, and of the Principality of Achaea thereafter, while the ports of Coron and Modon came under Venetian control. Apart from Coron and Modon, the rest of Messenia was captured by the Byzantine Despotate of the Morea in 1430.

=== Ottoman and Venetian period ===
Much of Messenia fell into the hands of the Ottoman Empire in 1460, a part of the area remained with the Venetian Republic until the Second Ottoman–Venetian War (1499–1503). In 1534 a group of families, known as the 'Coroni', settled in Piana degli Albanesi in Sicily. They were Arvanites and Greeks from Koroni.

During the 1680s, the whole of Messenia was regained by the Venetian Republic in the Morean War, and formed part of the "Kingdom of the Morea" until recovered by the Ottomans in 1715. The Mani Peninsula, a part of modern Messenia, remained autonomous from Turkish rule.

=== Modern period ===
Messenia became part of independent Greece as a result of the Greek War of Independence (1821-1832). The famous naval Battle of Navarino took place near present Pylos in 1827, and was a decisive victory for Greece and its allies.

During the World War II several battles of the Greek Resistance against the Nazi occupation forces and the collaborationist security battalions took place in Messenia, including Battle of Meligalas, Battle of Kalamata, Battle of Chora - Agorelitsa.

The population in the area of Kalamata and Messene increased from 30,000 before World War II up to nearly 80,000 in the present day. Messenia suffered damage from the 2007 Greek forest fires.

== See also ==
- List of settlements in Messenia
- Messenia (constituency)

== Bibliography ==
- Hellenic Interior Ministry (18 March 2001). Δείτε τη Διοικητική Διαίρεση (in Greek). Hellenic Interior Ministry.. The previous Kapodistrias organization of all the communities in Greece. The populations are from the Census of 2001.
- Kontogiannis, N.D. "Settlements and countryside of Messinia during the late Middle Ages: the testimony of the fortifications," Byzantine and Modern Greek Studies, 34,1 (2010), 3-29.
