= Agioi Pantes (island) =

Island in Greece

Native name: Άγιοι Πάντες
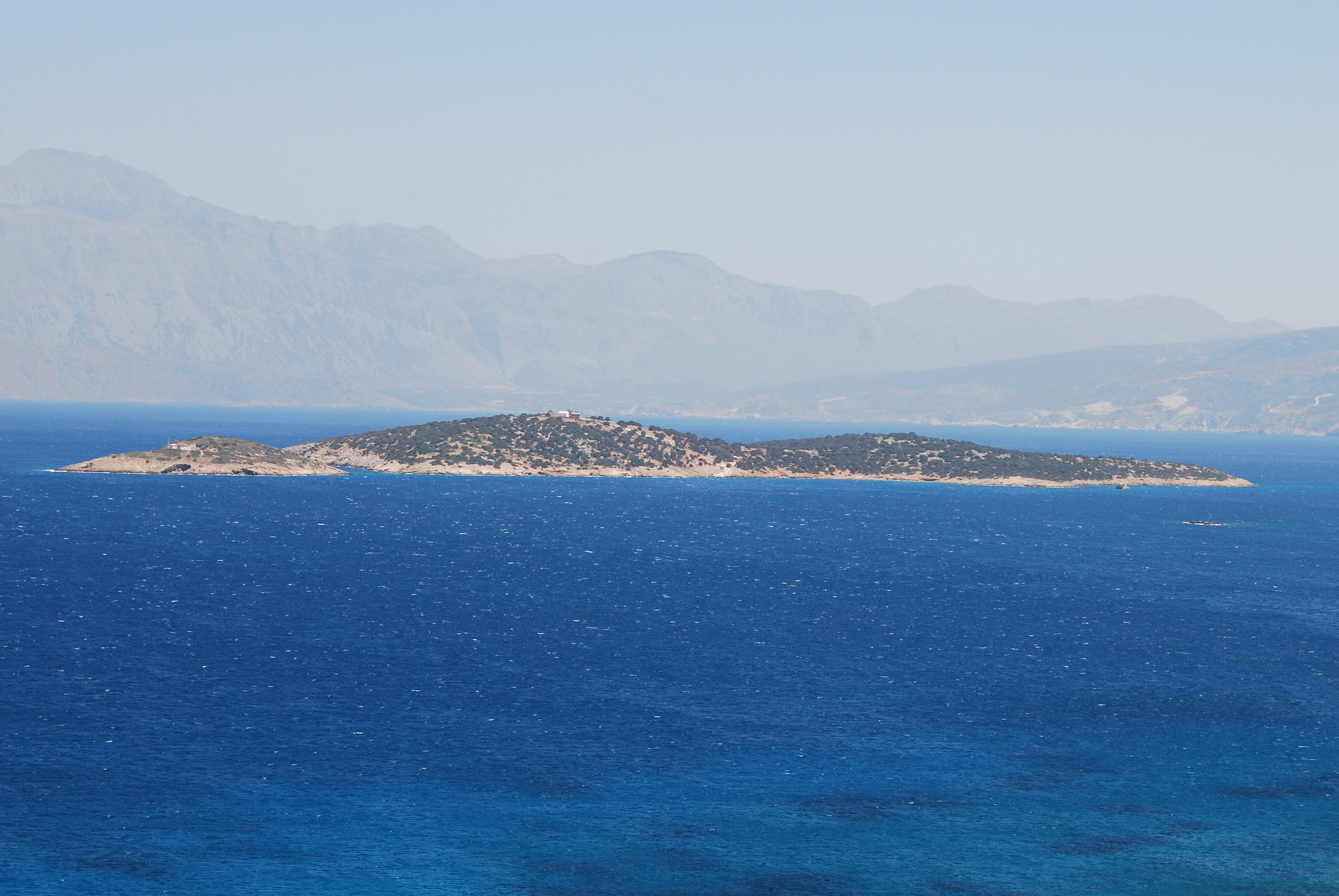
- The islet of Agioi Pantes.

- Location within Greece

Geography
- Coordinates: 35.197°N 25.730°E
- Archipelago: Cretan Islands
- Area: 0.346 km^{2} (0.134 sq mi)

Administration
- Greece
- Region: Crete
- Regional unit: Lasithi

Agioi Pantes (Greek: Άγιοι Πάντες, "All Saints"), is a Greek islet, north of the coast of Lasithi, eastern Crete, close to Agios Nikolaos. In antiquity, it was named Pyrrha or Pyrra (Ancient Greek: Πύρρα).

== See also ==
- List of islands of Greece
