= Palace of Nestor =

Mycenaean archaeological site in Greece

Coordinates: 37°01′38″N 21°41′42″E

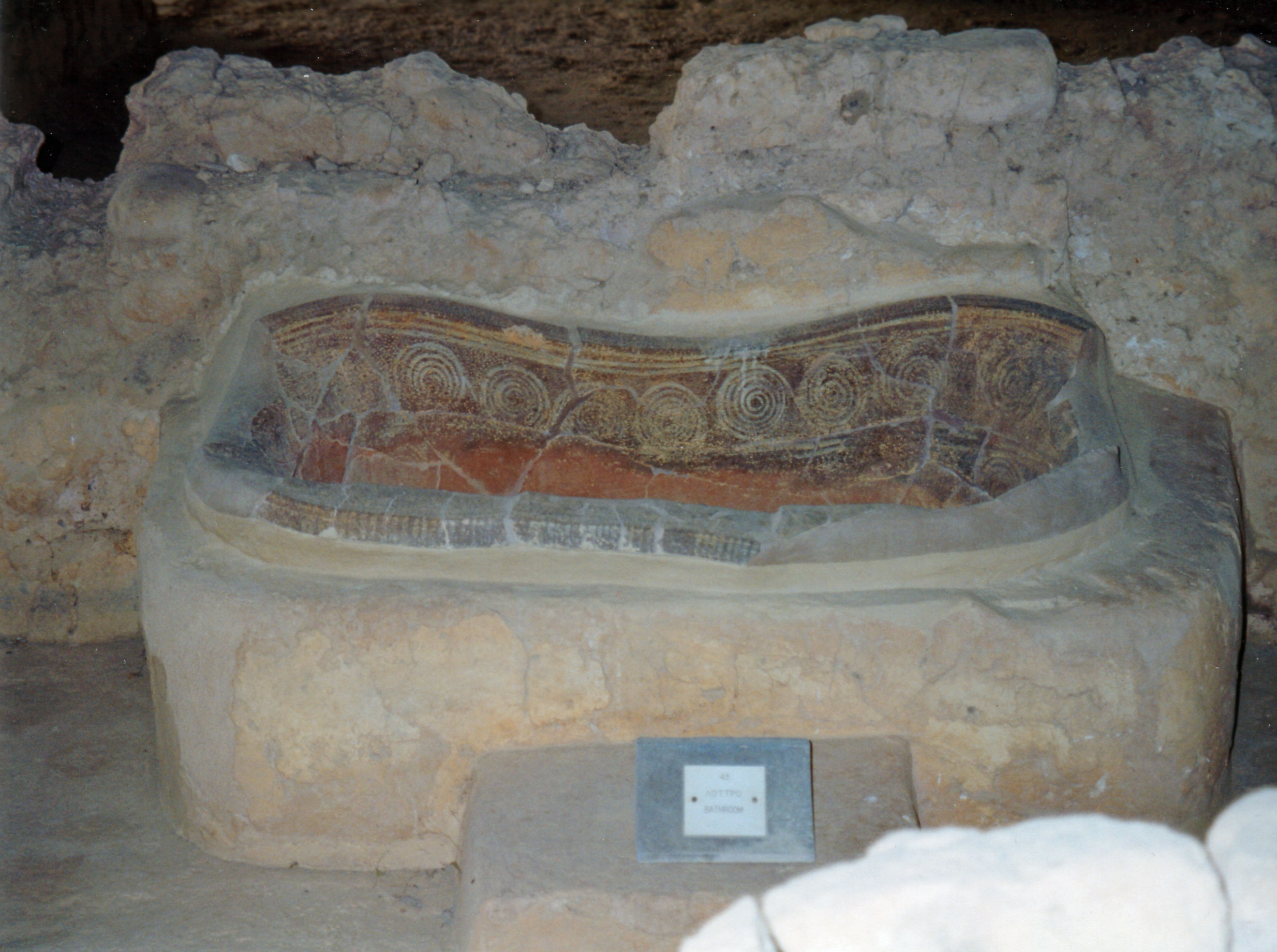
Bath in Palace of Nestor

The Palace of Nestor (Modern Greek: Ανάκτορο του Νέστορα) was an important centre in Mycenaean times and is traditionally identified with the palace of the Homeric king Nestor at "sandy Pylos", described in Homer's Odyssey and Iliad.

The palace featured in the story of the Trojan War, as Homer tells us that Telemachus:

went to Pylos and to Nestor, the shepherd of the people, and he received me in his lofty house and gave me kindly welcome, as a father might his own son who after a long time had newly come from afar: even so kindly he tended me with his glorious sons.

The archeological site is the best preserved Mycenaean Greek palace discovered. The palace is the primary structure within a larger Late Helladic era settlement, once probably surrounded by a fortified wall. The palace was a two-storey building with store rooms, workshops, baths, light wells, reception rooms and a sewage system.

The settlement had been long occupied, with most artifacts discovered dating from 1300 BC. The palace complex was destroyed by fire around 1250 BC.

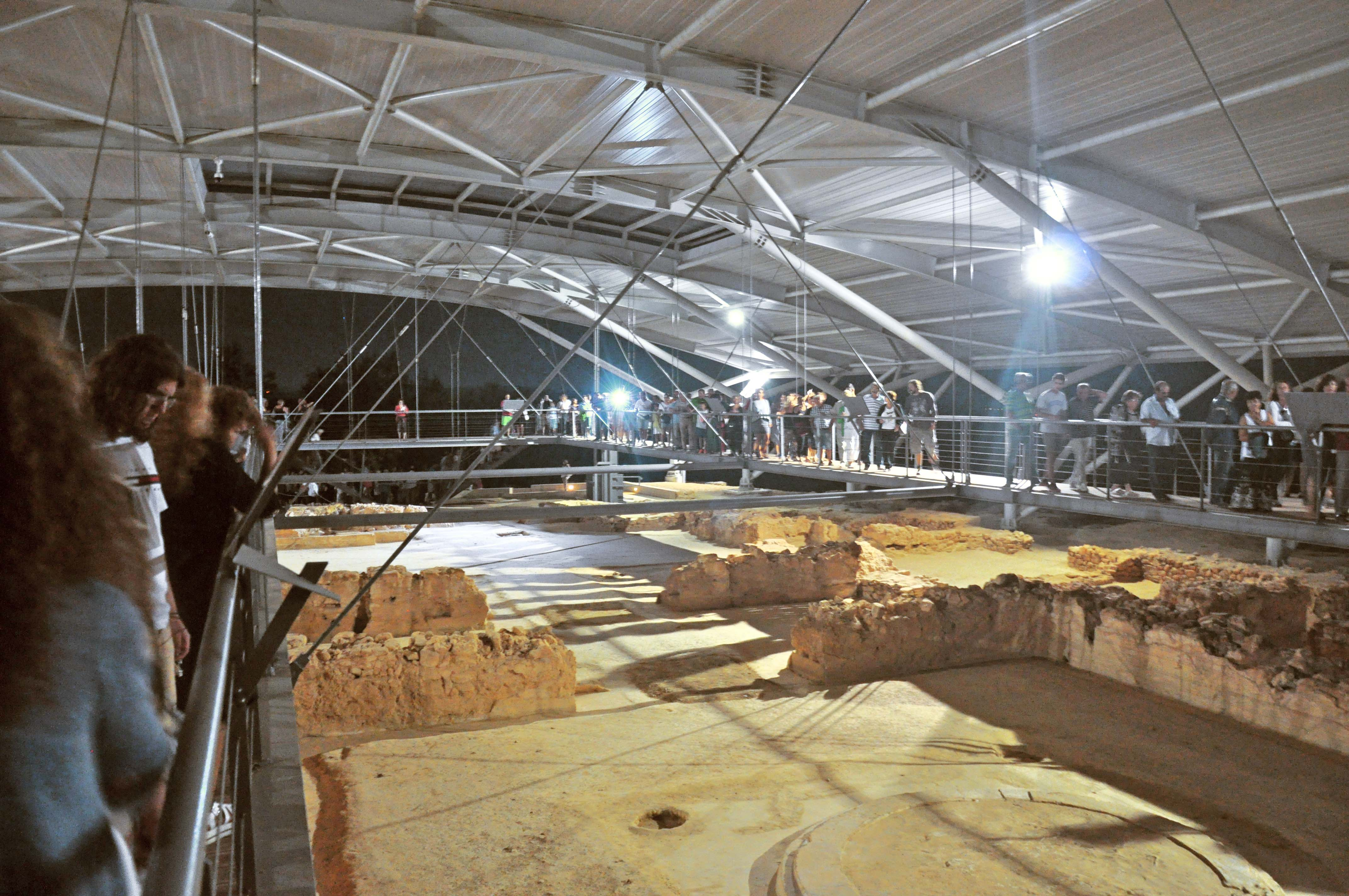
The site with a new roof

In June 2016, the site reopened to the public after the roof was replaced by a modern structure with raised walkways for visitors.

== Location ==
The site is on the hill of Epano Englianos, situated close to the road 4 kilometres (2.5 mi) south of Chora and 17 kilometres (11 mi) north of Pylos, at 150 metres (490 ft) above sea level and in an area of 170 metres (560 ft) by 90 metres (300 ft).

== Excavations ==
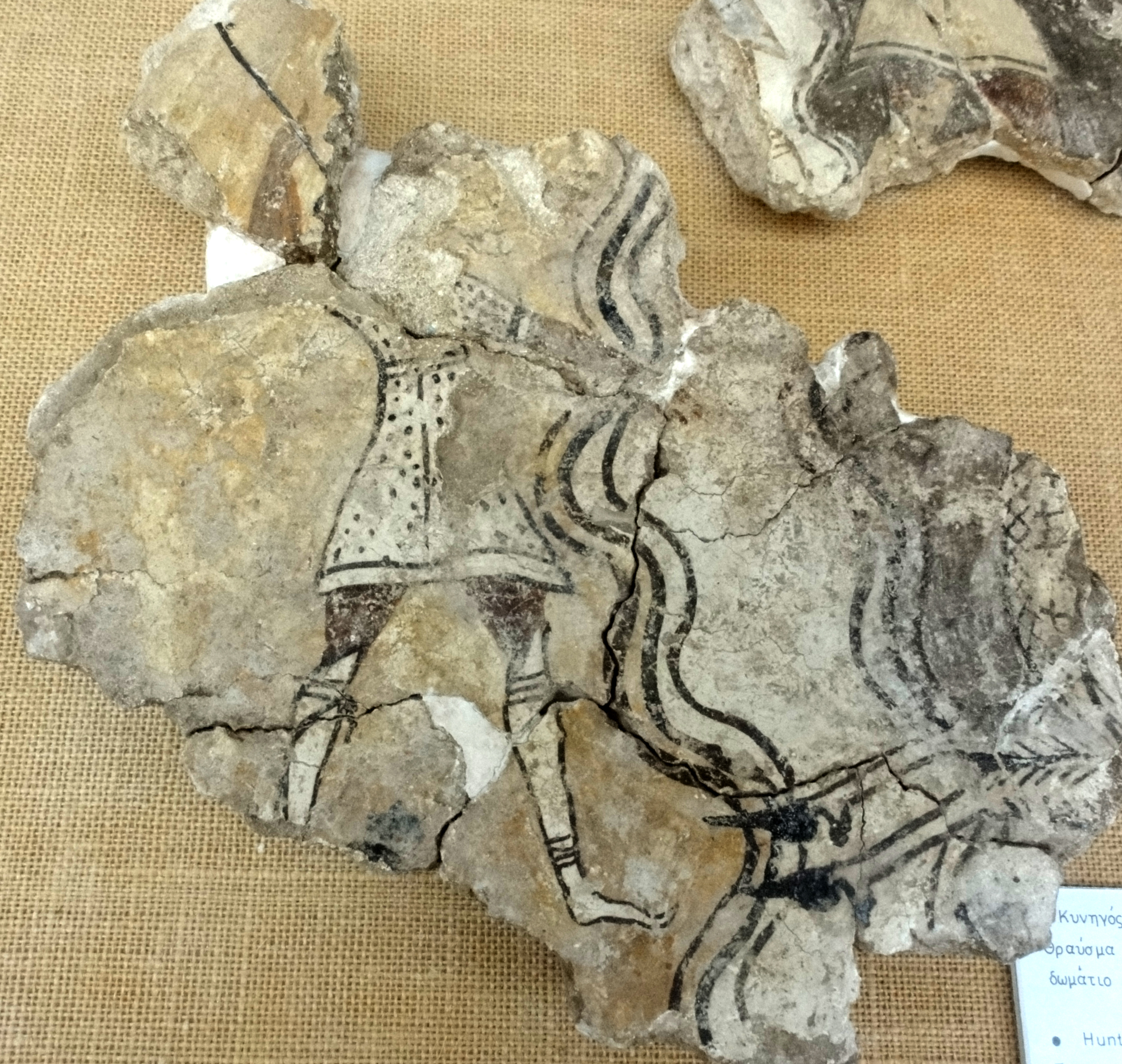
Fresco of hunter and stag, found in room 43

In 1912 and 1926, two tholos tombs north of the Bay of Navarino were excavated. One contained three decorated jars, and the other a collection of Early Mycenaean and Middle Helladic pots.

A joint Hellenic-American expedition was formed with the Greek Archaeological Service and the University of Cincinnati and trial excavations of Epano Englianos were started on 4 April 1939. From the first day, stone walls, fresco fragments, Mycenaean pottery, and inscribed tablets were found. It was later revealed that these prehistoric fresco paintings were actually egg tempera murals, making them some of the oldest examples in the world of the use of this kind of paint.

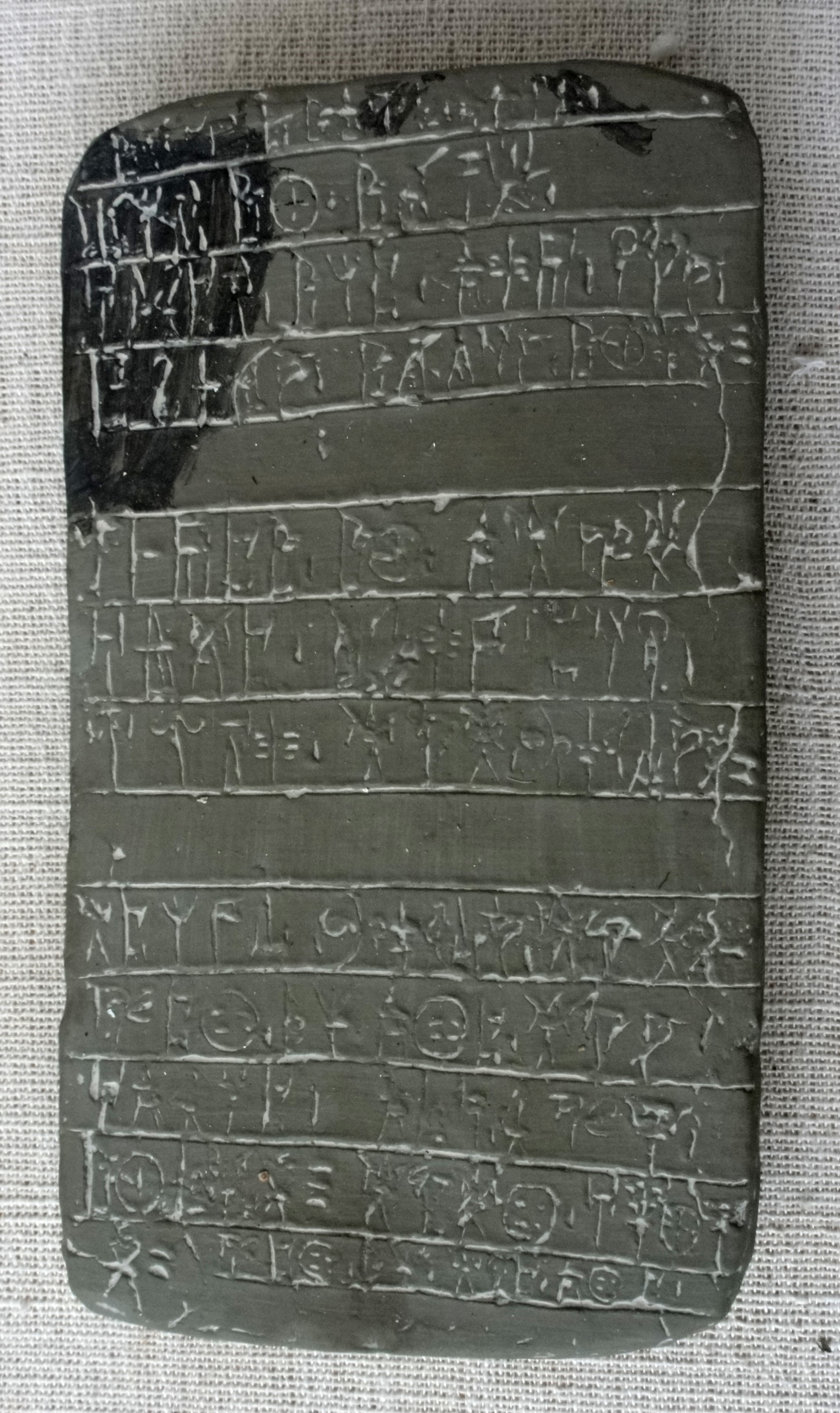
Linear B tablet from the palace at Chora Museum

During excavation in 1939, around 1,000 Linear B clay tablets were found. The tablets were taken to the National Archaeological Museum in Athens: cleaning and repair took place between late 1939 and early 1940. Although the tablets were photographed by Alison Frantz, allowing some photographs to be sent back to the University of Cincinnati, they were soon removed to the Bank of Greece to protect them from the coming war, and would not be removed from its vaults until 1950.

A systematic excavation was impossible throughout World War II, and excavations resumed in 1952. From 1952 to 1966, the Palace was uncovered with areas around the acropolis being further explored. A breakthrough in translating the Linear B tablets was achieved by English architect Michael Ventris in 1952, who found that it was an archaic form of Greek. The translation of such tablets in the following years showed that they consisted of part of the royal archive, thus confirming that the palace served as the administrative, political, and financial centre of Mycenaean Messenia.

=== The Griffin Warrior Tomb ===
In 2015, the University of Cincinnati uncovered an extraordinarily rich find not far from the palace. This undisturbed burial of a Mycenaean warrior, called the "griffin warrior" by the team, yielded gold rings, bronze weapons, and many other artifacts. The iconography of the artifacts displays a mixture of Minoan and Mycenaean culture.

== See also ==
- Enkheljāwōn, a person whom modern scholars regard as a possible king of Mycenaean Pylos.
- Eritha, a Pylian priestess whose land dispute is known from records uncovered at the Palace of Nestor.

== Sources ==
- Blegen, Carl William; Rawson, Marion; Davis, Jack L.; Shelmerdine, Cynthia W. (2001), A Guide to the Palace of Nestor, Mycenaean Sites in its Environs and the Chora Museum (2 ed.), ASCSA, ISBN 978-0876616406
- Blegen, Carl William; Rawson, Marion; Lang, Mabel (1966–1973), The Palace of Nestor at Pylos in western Messenia, Princeton University Press for the University of Cincinnati, OCLC 512087
  - v. 1. The buildings and their contents, by C. W. Blegen and M. Rawson. pt. 1. Text. pt. 2. Illustrations.
  - v. 2. The frescoes, by M. L. Lang.
  - v. 3. Acropolis and lower town: tholoi, grave circle, and chamber tombs; discoveries outside the citadel, by C. W. Blegen and others.
