= Battle of Chora - Agorelitsa =

- Part of Second World War, Greek Resistance
Date	July 19, 1944
Location	Between Chora, Messinia and Ampelofyto, Messinia (also called Agorelitsa)
Result	ELAS victory

Belligerents
ELAS	Nazi occupation forces

Casualties and losses
18 dead, 8 wounded	78 dead Germans, 30 captured, war material captured or destroyed

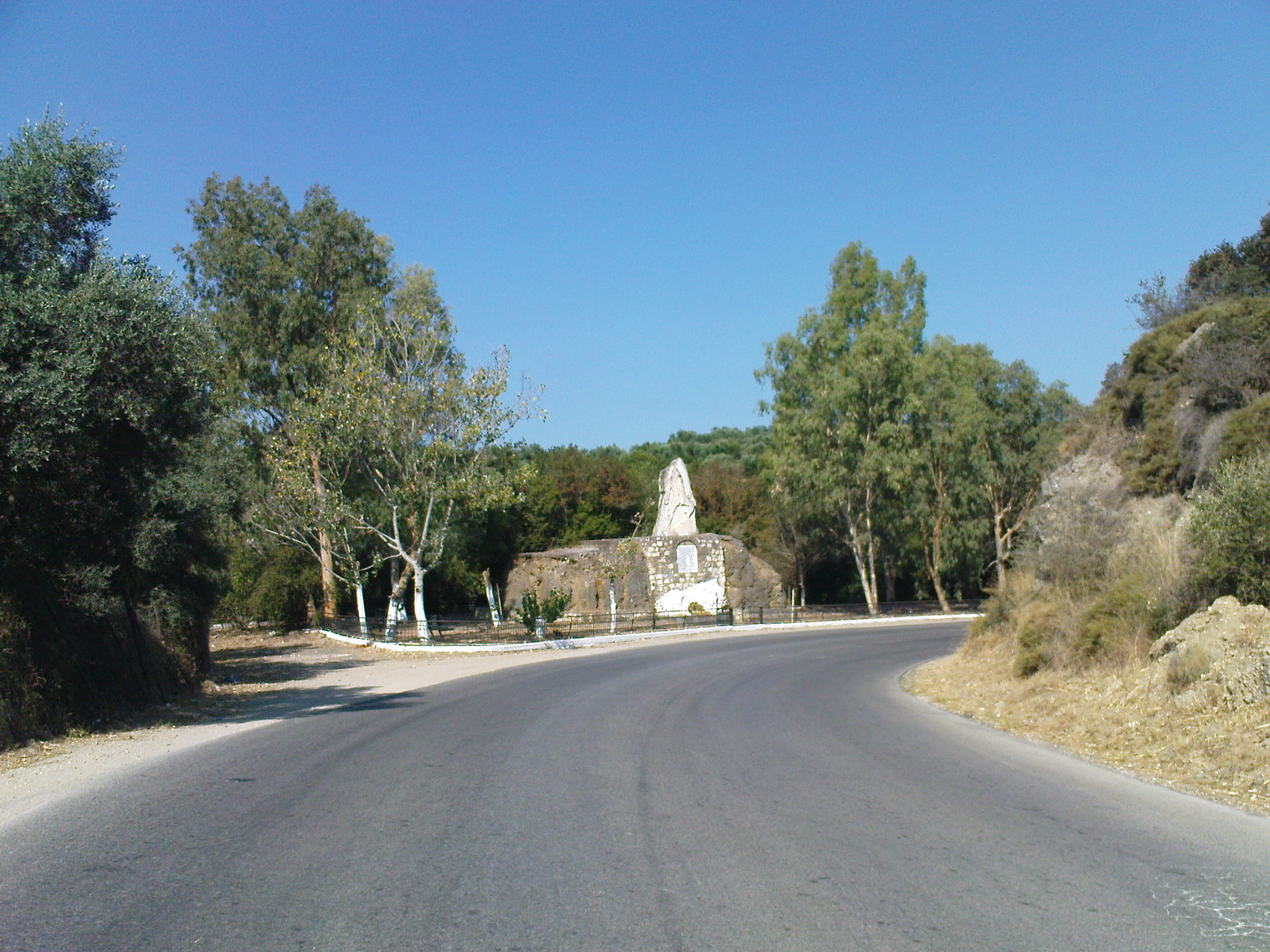
Memorial site at the location of the Battle of Chora - Agorelitsa

The Battle of Chora - Agorelitsa was fought on July 19, 1944 between Greek Peoples' Liberation Army (ELAS) against the Nazi occupation forces.

== Broader context ==
After Aris Velouchiotis' descend to Peloponnese (based on commands of the Political Committee of National Liberation), the Greek Resistance became more active in central and southern Peloponnese to the extent that Peloponnese was considered war zone by the Nazis.

== The battle ==
The National Liberation Front's political organization had informed ELAS that a battalion of the German occupiers would leave Pylos and head towards Gargalianoi - Kyparissia. Based on this information, ELAS forces hid on July 17 between Ampelofyto (Agorelitsa) and Chora to ambush the Nazi forces. On July 19, the German military left Pylos and when they reached the location of ELAS forces, the battle started. The victory of ELAS was decisive: ELAS suffered 18 casualties and 8 wounded while the Germans suffered 78 casualties (according to some 180), 30 Germans were taken prisoners and vehicles and war material was captured or destroyed by ELAS. Among the casualties of ELAS was Ilias Sfakianakis, the leader of the battalion that made the ambush.

== Commemoration ==
Each year an event in memory of the fallen of ELAS takes place. The names of ELAS' casualties are:

- Ηλίας Σφακιανάκης, Ταγματάρχης (Ilias Sfakianakis, Leader of the Battalion)
- Γεώργιος Μανωλάκος (Georgios Manolakos)
- Νικόλαος Δημητρακόπουλος/Πλαστήρας (Nikolaos Dimitrakopoulos/Plastiras)
- Χαράλαμπος Χάτζος (Charalampos Chatzos)
- Γεώργιος Μούντανος (Georgios Mountanos)
- Ηλίας Πατικόπουλος (Ilias Patikopoulos)
- Παύλος Παυλίδης (Pavlos Pavlidis), nickname Κανάκης (Kanakis)
- Γιώργης ΦΙλιππόπουλος (Giorgis Filippopoulos)
- Νίκος Στατηγουλέας (Nikos Statigouleas)
- Γιάννης Οικονομέας (Giannis Oikonomeas)
- Νέστορας Κολοκάθης (Nestoras Kolokathis)
- Βασίλης Βασιλικός (Vasilis Vasilikos)
- Μιχάλης Παπαθεοδωρακάκης (Michalis Papatheodorakis)
- Νικόλαος Σταματελόπουλος (Nikolaos Stamatelopoulos)
- Νικόλαος Βλαχαδάμης (Nikolaos Vlachadamis)
- Πέτρος Κατελάνος (Petros Katelanos)
- Πέτρος Τσαπέκης (Petros Tsapekis)
- Παναγιώτης Κομποχόλης (Panagiotis Kompocholis)
