= Silahdar Yusuf Pasha =

Ottoman vizier and grand admiral of the Ottoman Navy

- Born: Josef Mašković c. 1604; Vrana, Croatia (Then Bosnia Eyalet of Ottoman Empire)
- Died: 22 January 1646 (aged 41–42); Constantinople, Ottoman Empire
- Spouse: Fatma Sultan (m. 1645)
- Military career
- Allegiance: Ottoman Empire
- Branch: Ottoman Navy
- Service years: fl. 1643–1646
- Wars and campaigns: Cretan War (1645–69)

Silahdar Yusuf Pasha (Turkish: Silahdar Yusuf Paşa, Ottoman Turkish: سلاحدار یوسف پاشا; c. 1604 – 22 January 1646) also known as Jusuf Mašković, was an Ottoman vezir and admiral (Kapudan Pasha, grand admiral of the Ottoman fleet), known for conquering Chania in western Crete in only 54 days in 1645 during the Cretan War (1645–69). He built a large han, or Turkish inn, at Vrana in 1644, which still stands today.

== Early life ==
A convert from Christianity, he was surnamed Mašković (known in Croatian as Jusuf Mašković), and was born around 1604, in Vrana, a town in Ravni kotari in Dalmatia, at the time situated at the Venetian–Ottoman frontier. He was an ethnic Croat. According to Frane Difnico, Yusuf was the servant of Durak Bey, while Girolamo Brusoni claims that his father was the servant of Halil Bey, and that Yusuf was the groomer of Ibrahim Bey Bećiragić in Nadin. Brusoni said that Yusuf eventually came into good relations with the Beys, who even claimed him as a relative and near friend ("Durachbeg, che si dice suo parente" "Il Sapitan bie Bessiraghch, suo amico"). At the service of the Bećiragići in Nadin, Josef learned Turkish and the Arabic script. Though he was a sharp and intelligent boy, he was in serious poverty; once an elder lady of Nadin saw him barefooted and gave him opanci (leather shoes). While following his master on a trip, he got to know a gatekeeper of the Porte, and decided to join Ottoman service in Constantinople.

== Ottoman service ==
He was a silahdar at one point and was an ally of Djindji Khodja.

When Yusuf Pasha returned to Constantinople in 1645, he married Fatma Sultan, the three-year-old daughter of Sultan Ibrahim I. He was also given the Ibrahim Pasha Palace as a residence. However, one year later on 22 January 1646, he was executed by the Sultan at the persuasion of Yusuf Pasha's political rivals.

== Legacy ==
In 1644, he built a large han, or Turkish inn, named Maškovića Han, at Vrana.
