= Agioi Theodoroi (islands) =

Group of islands in Greece

Native name: Άγιοι Θεόδωροι
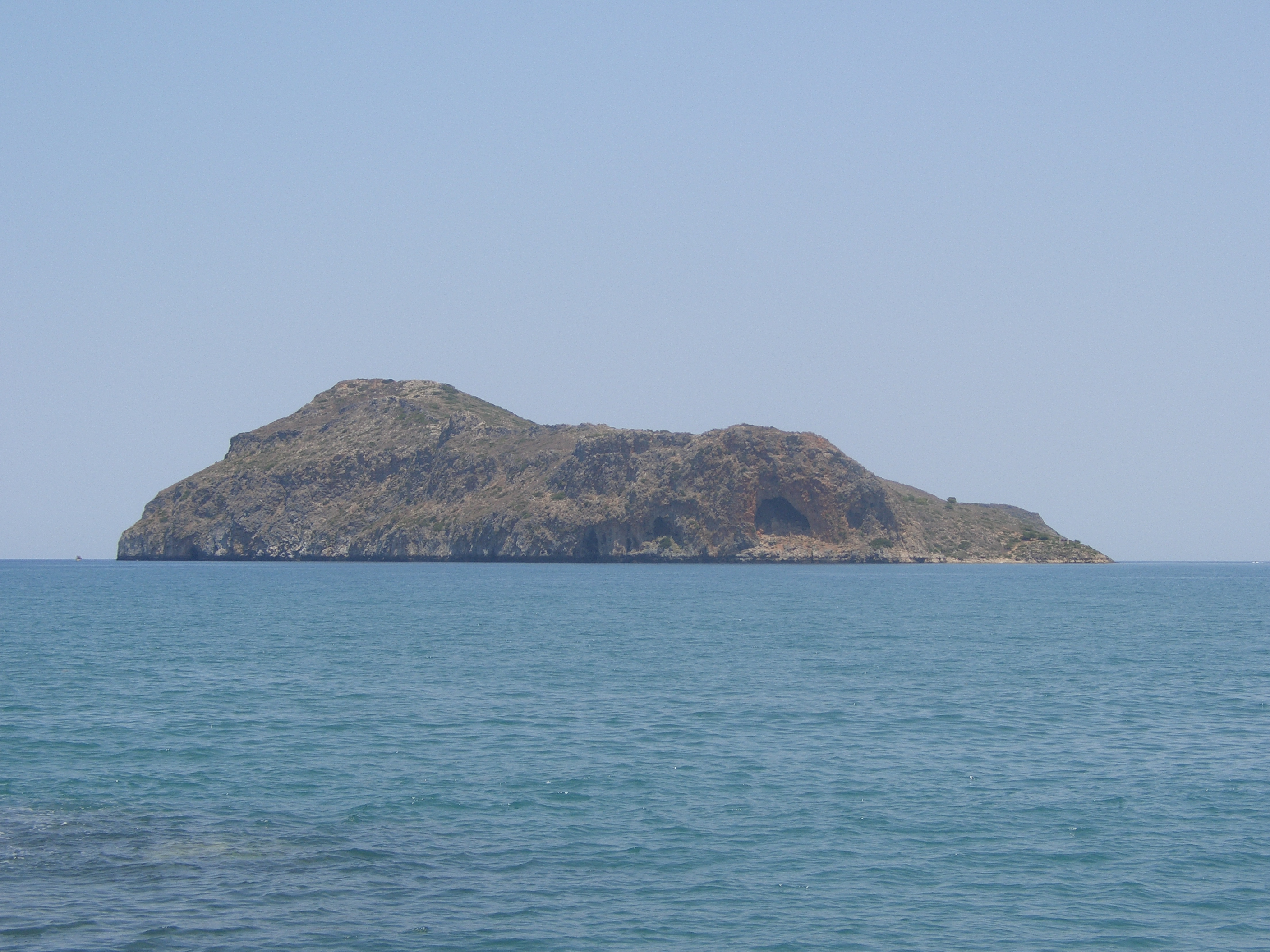
- The islet of Agios Theodoros.

- Location within Greece

Geography
- Coordinates: 35.537°N 23.931°E
- Archipelago: Cretan Islands
- Highest elevation: 165 m (541 ft)

Administration
- Greece
- Region: Crete
- Regional unit: Chania

Demographics
- Population: 0 (2001)

Agioi Theodoroi (Greek: Άγιοι Θεόδωροι) are two uninhabited islets off the coast of western Crete. One is named Agios Theodoros, also called Thodorou, and the islet a few metres further north is called Mikros Agios Theodoros ("Little Agios Theodoros"). Administratively, they are part of the municipality of Platanias, in Chania regional unit. Kri-kri inhabit Agios Theodoros. Anciently, the islands were known as Coete or Koite (Ancient Greek: Κοίτη) and Akytos.

== History ==
The islands are mentioned in antiquity (2nd half of the third century) in the Stadiasmus Maris Magni, which states that they have potable water.

In 1583 the Venetians built two small fortresses on Agios Theodoros in part to prevent pirates from using the islands and in part to defend the coast of Crete.

== Environment ==
=== Birds ===
The islets have been recognised as an Important Bird Area (IBA) by BirdLife International because they support a breeding population of 50 – 65 pairs of Eleonora's falcons.

=== Goats ===
In 1930 the municipality of Agia Marina with the cooperation of the hunting association of Chania decided to make the islands a nature reserve. It was in 1935 that Theodoros Viglis caught one male and two female kri-kri, or Cretan goats, in Samariá Gorge and released them on Agios Theodoros so that they could breed with integrity since no other goats inhabited the island. This initial small community of kri-kri was too small to prevent inbreeding and more kri-kri were introduced to the community. The isolated community of kri-kri at Agios Theodoros has been used to provide kri-kri to zoos around the world.

== See also ==
- List of islands of Greece
