= July 18 (Eastern Orthodox liturgics) =

Day in the Eastern Orthodox liturgical calendar

Eastern Orthodox liturgical calendar
July 17	July 18	July 19
July 18 O.S. ≍ July 31 N.S. July 18 N.S ≍ July 5 O.S.

An Eastern Orthodox cross

July 18 in Eastern Orthodox liturgical calendars is a feast day and a day of commemoration of saints and martyrs. Although some Orthodox churches use the Revised Julian Calendar and others use the traditional Julian calendar, the fixed commemorations for their respective July 18 are broadly the same, no matter which calendar is used. (Note: Despite the dates being the same, the days to which they refer typically differ by 13 days. The notation Old Style or O.S. is sometimes used to indicate a date in the traditional Julian Calendar (the "Old Calendar"). The notation New Style or N.S. indicates a date in the Revised Julian calendar (the "New Calendar").)

== Saints ==
- Martyr Emilian of Silistra in Bulgaria (363) (Note: "At Dorostorum, in Mysia, in the time of Julian the Apostate and the governor Capitolinus, St. Æmilian, martyr, who was cast into a furnace, and thus received the palm of martyrdom.") (Note: Name days celebrated today include: Emilianos, Emilio (Αἰμιλιανός, Αἰμίλιος); Emiliani, Emilia (Αἰμιλιανή, Αίμιλία).)
- Martyr Markellos (Marcellus, Marcel), roasted alive.
- Martyrs Dasius and Maron, by the sword.
- Martyrs Paul, Valentina and Theia (Theis, Thoe), siblings, at Diocaesarea (363) (see also: July 16)
- Martyr Hyacinth of Amastris (4th century)
- Venerable Pambo, hermit of Egypt (4th century)
- Great-martyr Athanasius of Klysma, Egypt (4th century)
- Saint Barlaam, ascetic, of Bald Mountain, near Antioch in Syria (6th century)
- Saint John the Confessor, Metropolitan of Chalcedon (9th century)
- Saint Stephen II of Constantinople, Patriarch of Constantinople (928)

== Pre-Schism Western saints ==
- Martyr Symphorosa of Tivoli near Rome, and her seven martyred sons:(c. 138) (Note: "At Tivoli, in the time of the emperor Adrian, St. Symphorosa, wife of the martyr St. Getulius, with her seven sons, Crescens, Julian, Nemesius, Primitivus, Justinus, Stacteus, and Eugenius. Their mother, because of her invincible constancy, was first buffeted a long time, then suspended by her hair, and lastly thrown into the river with a stone tied to her body. Her sons had their limbs distended by pulleys and bound to stakes, and terminated their martyrdom by different kinds of death. The bodies were subsequently taken to Rome, and were found in the sacristy of St. Angelo in Piscina.")

- Crescens, Julian, Nemesius, Primitivus, Justin, Stacteus, and Eugene, under the Emperor Hadrian.

- Saint Marina of Orense (Marina of Águas Santas), a martyr in Orense in Spain (139) (Note: "In Spanish Galicia, St. Marina, virgin and martyr.")
- Virgin martyr Gundenis, martyred in Carthage in North Africa under Septimius Severus (203) (Note: "At Carthage, St. Gundenes, virgin. By order of the proconsul Rufinus, she was four different times stretched on the rack for the faith of Christ, horribly lacerated with iron hooks, confined for a long time in a filthy dungeon, and finally put to the sword.")
- Saint Maternus, Bishop of Milan in Italy (328) (Note: He suffered a great deal during the persecution of Diocletian, but survived and reposed in peace.) (Note: "At Milan, in the reign of Maximian, the holy bishop Maternus. For the faith of Christ and the church entrusted to him, he was thrown into prison and often scourged. Finally he went to his rest in the Lord with a great renown for his repeated confession of the faith.")
- Saint Rufillus (Ruffilius), first Bishop of Forlimpopoli in Emilia in Italy (382) (Note: "At Forlimpopoli, in Æmilia, St. Ruffillus, bishop of that city.")
- Saint Philastrius, born in Spain, he became Bishop of Brescia in Italy at the time of the Arian troubles (c. 397) (Note: He wrote a book against the Arians which still exists. His successor, St Gaudentius, praised him for his 'modesty, quietness and gentleness towards all men' and for his love for the poor.) (Note: "At Brescia, the birthday of St. Philastrius, bishop of that city, who in speech and writing combated heretics, especially the Arians, from whom he suffered much. Finally, he died in peace, renowned for miracles.")
- Saint Goneri of Brittany, an exile from Britain to Brittany, where he lived as a hermit near Tréguier (6th century) (Note: "ST. GONERI, the hermit, was a native of Great Britain, and a priest, who withdrew to Brittany to seek a life of solitude. His first retreat was near Rohan, in the diocese of Vannes; but his miracles having discovered his sanctity, he quitted the spot and took refuge in the district of Tréguier, where he lived in perfect seclusion till the time of his blessed death. There is an ancient chapel at Plougrescant built over the place of his burial, and in it are still preserved with veneration considerable portions of his sacred relics.")
- Saint Arnulf of Metz, a monk at Lérins, later Bishop of Metz (640) (Note: A courtier of high standing in the palace of the Austrasian kings, he decided to become a monk at Lérins. His wife became a nun and Arnulf was on the point of going to Lérins when he was made Bishop of Metz (c 616). A few years before his death he finally managed to go and live as a hermit.) (Note: "At Metz, in France, St. Arnulf, a bishop illustrious for holiness and the gift of miracles. He chose an eremitical life, and ended his blessed career in peace.")
- Saint Eadburh of Bicester, a daughter of the pagan King Penda, she became a nun (c. 650) (Note: Her relics were later transferred from Adderbury (Edburgh's burgh) in Oxfordshire in England to Bicester.)
- Saint Theneva (Thenew, Thenova, Dwynwen), the mother of St Kentigern and patron-saint of Glasgow in Scotland together with him (7th century)
- Saint Frederick of Utrecht, Bishop of Utrecht in the Netherlands, martyr bishop (838) (Note: Bishop of Utrecht in Holland from 820 on, he was murdered while in church in Maastricht.)
- Saint Minnborinus of Cologne, born in Ireland, he became Abbot of St Martin's in Cologne in Germany (986)

== Post-Schism Orthodox saints ==
- Venerable John the Much-suffering, of the Kiev Caves (1160) (Note: See: (in Russian) Иоанн Многострадальный. Википедии. (Russian Wikipedia).)
- Venerable saints Onesiphoros, Pammegistos, Pamphoditis, Paphnutios, Pegon, Polemios, Sozomenos, Soterichos and Photios, of the "300 Allemagne Saints" of Cyprus (12th century) (Note: The 300 Allemagne Saints came to Cyprus from Palestine, and lived as ascetics in various parts of the island. According to some of their lives in the Great Synaxaristes, after the dissolution of the Second Crusade (1147 - 1149), they decided to live the monastic life in the Jordan desert. However since the Latins there disturbed them, they relocated to Cyprus and dispersed over the island.)
- Venerable Pambo the Recluse of the Kiev Far Caves (1241)
- Saint Leontius, founder of Karikhov Monastery, in Novgorod (1492)
- Hieromartyr Cosmas (Kozman), Hieromonk, of Gareji, Georgia (1630)

=== New martyrs and confessors ===
- New Hieromartyr Apollinarius (Mosalitinov), Hieromonk of the St. Nicholas Monastery, Verkhoturye (1918)
- New Martyrs Abbess Elizabeth (Romanova), Grand Duchess of Russia, and Nun Barbara, and those with them, at Alapaevsk (1918) (see also: July 5)

== Other commemorations ==
- Translation of the relics of Venerable Lazarus the Wonderworker, of Mt. Galesion. (see also: November 7, July 17)
- Icons of the Most Holy Theotokos "Tolga" (1314) and "Kaluga" (1748, 1892) (Note: See: (in Russian) Калужская икона Божией Матери. Википедии. (Russian Wikipedia).)
- Repose of Abbess Mavrikia (1867) and Abbess Zosima (1933), both of Goritsy Convent. (Note: See: (in Russian) Горицкий Воскресенский монастырь. Википедии. (Russian Wikipedia).)

== Icon gallery ==
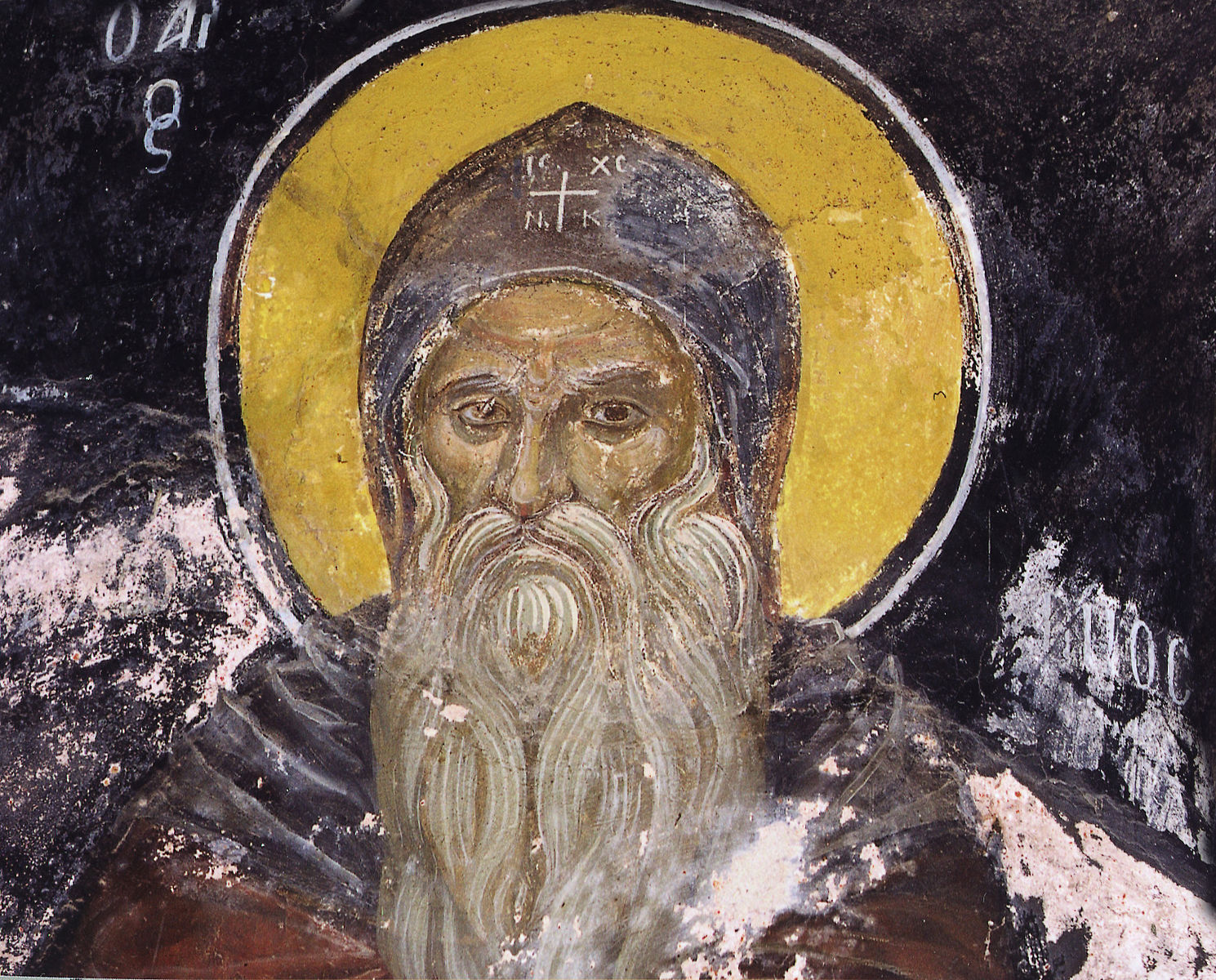
St. Pambo of Nitria.

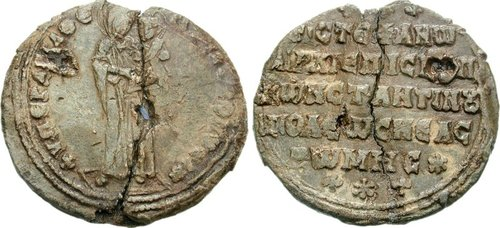
Lead seal of "Stephen, Archbishop of Constantinople New Rome" (either of Stephen I or Stephen II).

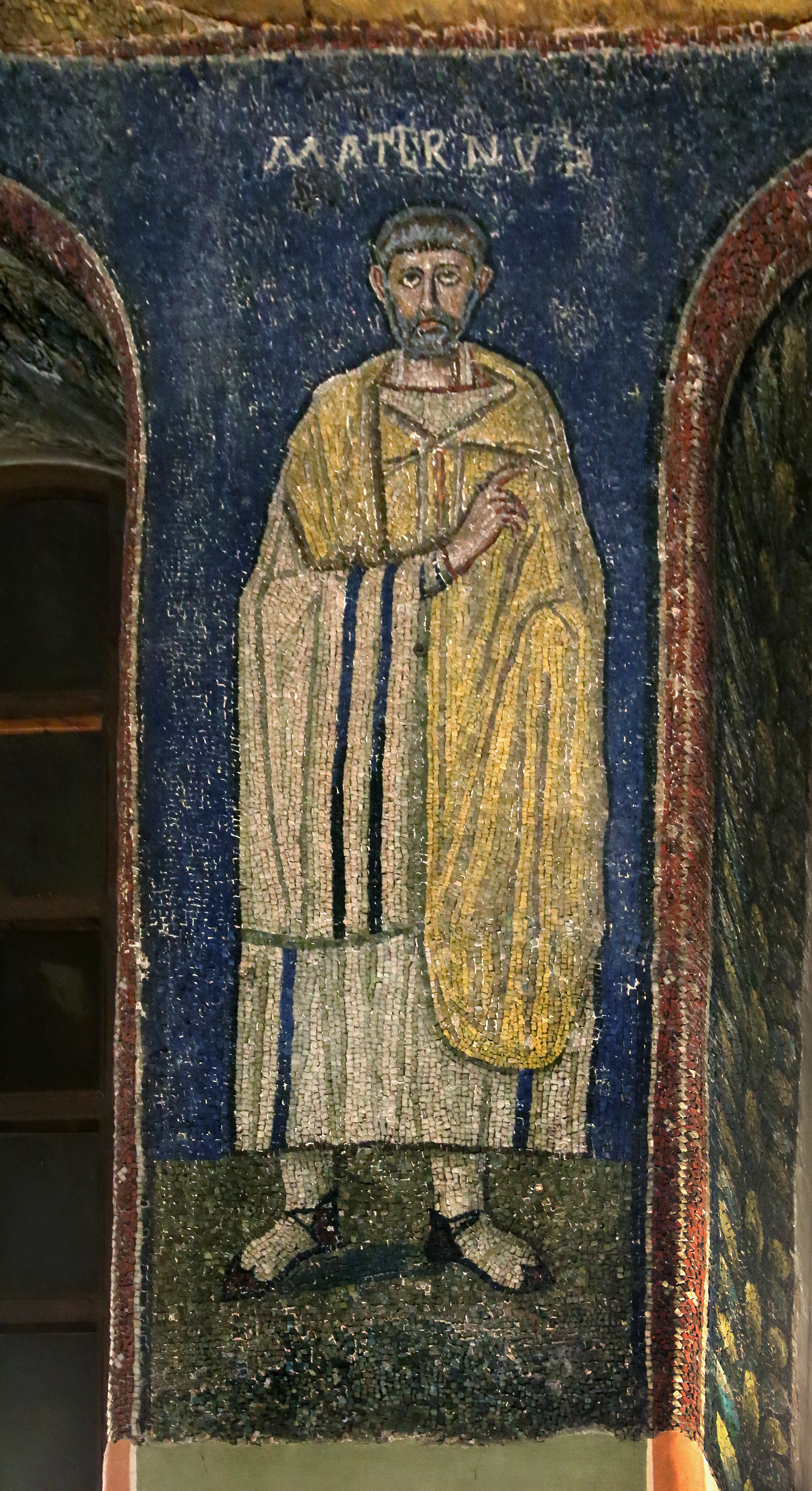
St. Maternus, Bishop of Milan.

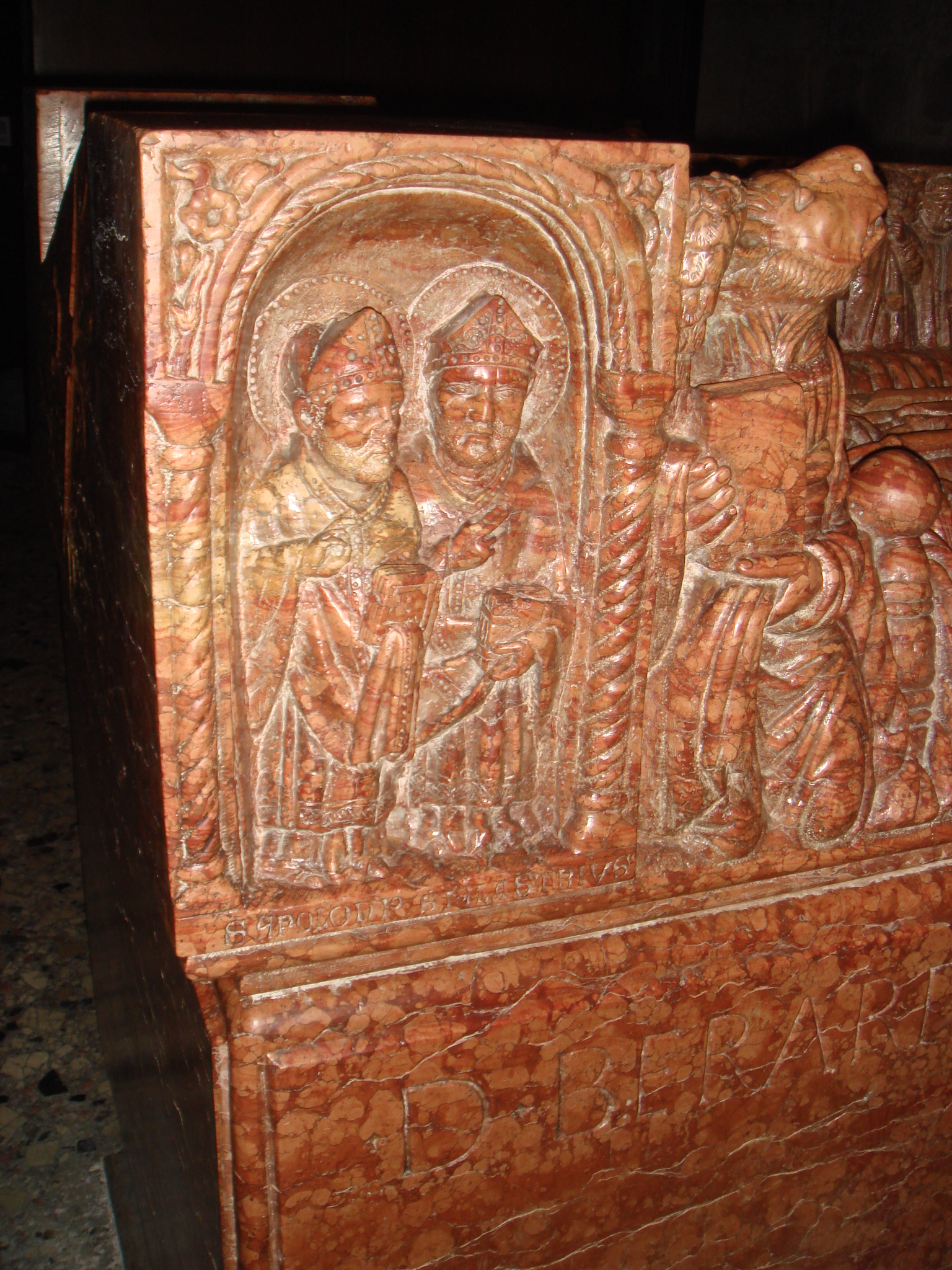
Relief of St. Philastrius (right side).

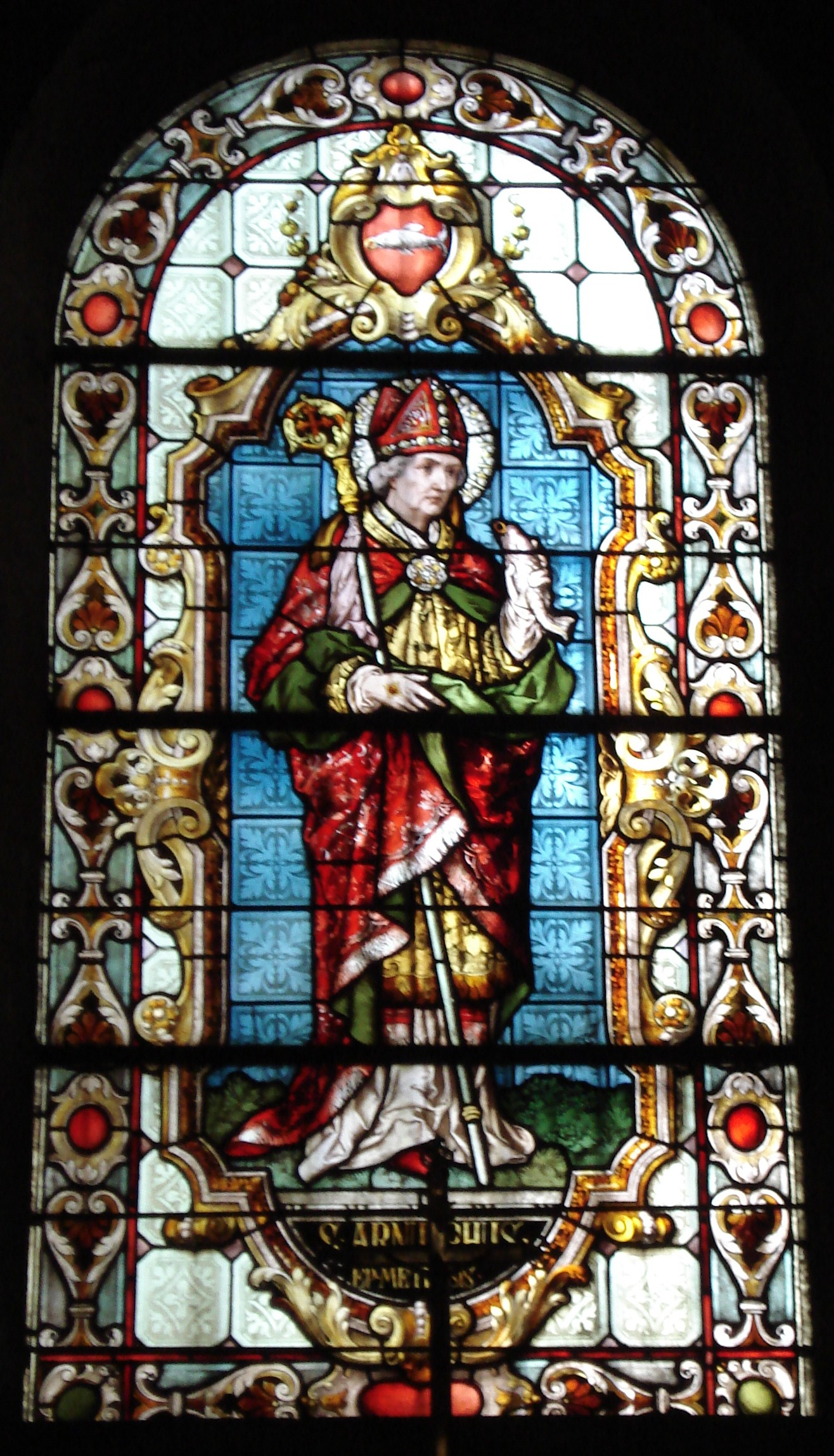
St. Arnulf of Metz.

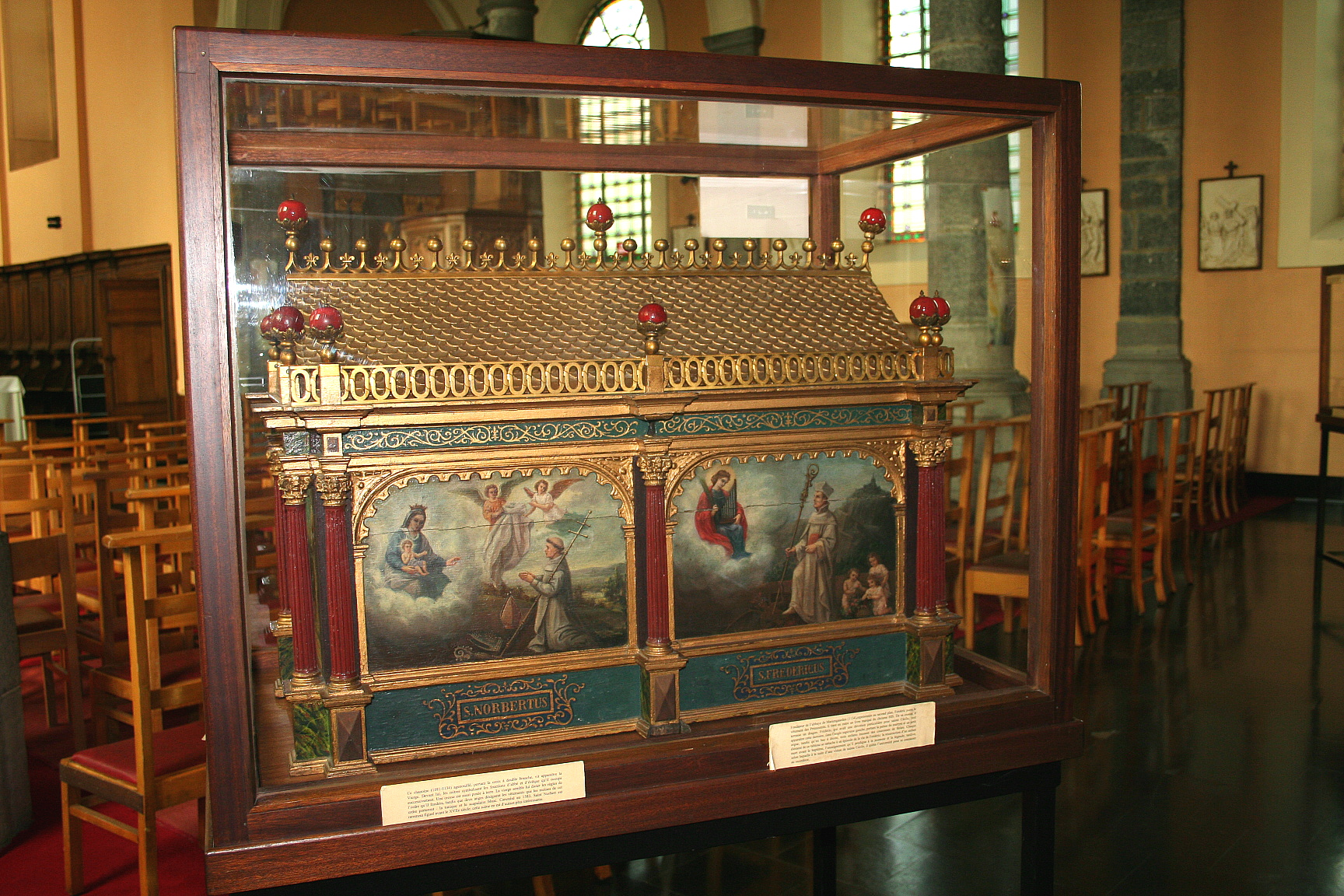
Reliquary of St. Frederick of Utrecht, martyr bishop.

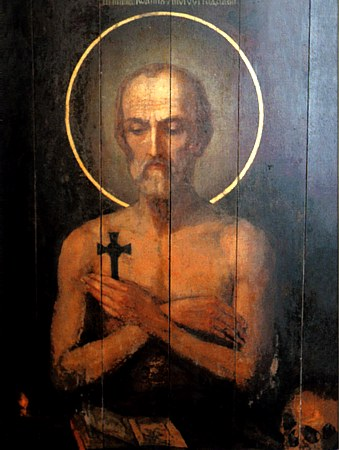
Venerbale John the Much-suffering, of the Kiev Caves.

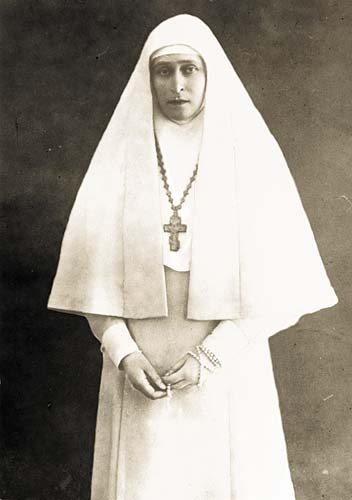
New Martyr Abbess Elizabeth (Romanova), Grand Duchess of Russia.

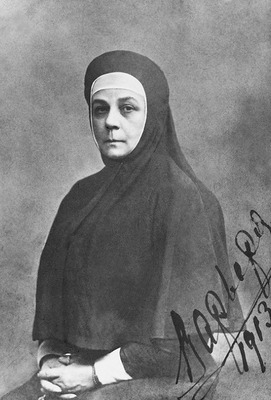
Nun Barbara (Yakovleva).

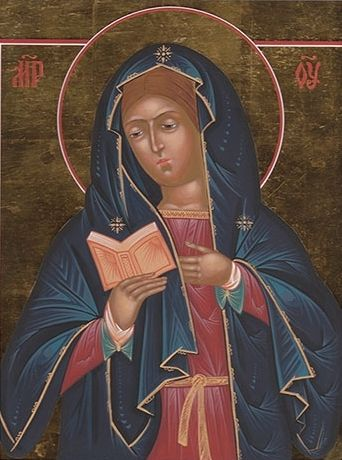
Icon of the Mother of God "Kaluga".

== Sources ==
- July 18/July 31. Orthodox Calendar (PRAVOSLAVIE.RU).
- July 31 / July 18. HOLY TRINITY RUSSIAN ORTHODOX CHURCH (A parish of the Patriarchate of Moscow).
- July 18. OCA - The Lives of the Saints.
- July 18. The Year of Our Salvation - Holy Transfiguration Monastery, Brookline, Massachusetts.
- The Autonomous Orthodox Metropolia of Western Europe and the Americas (ROCOR). St. Hilarion Calendar of Saints for the year of our Lord 2004. St. Hilarion Press (Austin, TX). p. 53.
- The Eighteenth Day of the Month of July. Orthodoxy in China.
- July 18. Latin Saints of the Orthodox Patriarchate of Rome.
- The Roman Martyrology. Transl. by the Archbishop of Baltimore. Last Edition, According to the Copy Printed at Rome in 1914. Revised Edition, with the Imprimatur of His Eminence Cardinal Gibbons. Baltimore: John Murphy Company, 1916. pp. 211–212.
- Rev. Richard Stanton. A Menology of England and Wales, or, Brief Memorials of the Ancient British and English Saints Arranged According to the Calendar, Together with the Martyrs of the 16th and 17th Centuries. London: Burns & Oates, 1892. pp. 346–347.

Greek Sources

- Great Synaxaristes: (in Greek) 18 ΙΟΥΛΙΟΥ. ΜΕΓΑΣ ΣΥΝΑΞΑΡΙΣΤΗΣ.
- (in Greek) Συναξαριστής. 18 Ιουλίου. ECCLESIA.GR. (H ΕΚΚΛΗΣΙΑ ΤΗΣ ΕΛΛΑΔΟΣ).
- (in Greek) 18/07/2026. Ορθόδοξος Συναξαριστής.

Russian Sources

- (in Russian) 31 июля (18 июля). Православная Энциклопедия под редакцией Патриарха Московского и всея Руси Кирилла (электронная версия). (Orthodox Encyclopedia - Pravenc.ru).
- (in Russian) 18 июля по старому стилю / 31 июля по новому стилю. СПЖ "Союз православных журналистов". 2026.
- (in Russian) 18 июля (ст.ст.) 31 июля 2026 (нов. ст.). Русская Православная Церковь Отдел внешних церковных связей. (DECR).
