= July 19 (Eastern Orthodox liturgics) =

Day in the Eastern Orthodox liturgical calendar

Eastern Orthodox liturgical calendar
July 18	July 19	July 20
July 19 O.S. ≍ August 1 N.S. July 19 N.S ≍ July 6 O.S.

An Eastern Orthodox cross

July 19 in Eastern Orthodox liturgical calendars is a feast day and a day of commemoration of saints and martyrs. Although some Orthodox churches use the Revised Julian Calendar and others use the traditional Julian calendar, the fixed commemorations for their respective July 19 are broadly the same, no matter which calendar is used. (Note: Despite the dates being the same, the days to which they refer typically differ by 13 days. The notation Old Style or O.S. is sometimes used to indicate a date in the traditional Julian Calendar (the "Old Calendar"). The notation New Style or N.S. indicates a date in the Revised Julian calendar (the "New Calendar").)

== Saints ==
- Venerable Abba Diocles of the Thebaid (4th century)
- Venerable Macrina the Younger, sister of Saints Basil the Great and Gregory of Nyssa (380) (Note: "In Cappadocia, the holy virgin Marcina, sister of St. Basil the Great and St. Gregory of Nyssa.")
- Venerable Dius of Antioch, Abbot, Wonderworker (c. 430)
- The Venerable 4 (or 40) fellow ascetics.
- Saint Gregory of Panedus, Bishop of Panedus, New Confessor for the holy icons’ sake. (Note: He is recorded in the Patmos Codex 266, without biographical details. However the "Diocese of Panedus" is not found anywhere; it was probably a reference to "Panios", which was located at Herakleia in Thrace.)
- Venerable Theodore the Sabbaite, Archbishop of Edessa in Mesopotamia (848) (see also: July 9)
- Venerable Michael, ascetic at the Holy Lavra of Saint Sabbas and the nephew of Venerable Theodore the Sabbaite the Bishop of Edessa.

== Pre-Schism Western saints ==
- Saint Martin of Trier, tenth Bishop of Trier in Germany and possibly a martyr (c. 210) (Note: "At Treves, St. Martin, bishop and martyr.")
- Saints Justa and Rufina of Seville, two sisters, potters by trade, martyred under Diocletian and venerated as the main patron-saints of Seville (287) (Note: "At Seville, in Spain, the martyrdom of the holy virgins Justa and Rufina. Arrested by the governor Diogenian, they were stretched on the rack and lacerated with iron claws, then imprisoned, and subjected to starvation and various tortures. Lastly Justa breathed her last in prison, and Rufina had her neck broken while confessing Christ.")
- Saint Arsenius the Great of Scetis, an anchorite in Egypt and one of the most highly regarded Desert Fathers (c. 449) (Note: Surnamed also 'the Roman' and 'the deacon', being actually a Roman deacon. He was called by Theodosius the Great to Constantinople to become the tutor of Arcadius and Honorius, the Emperor's sons (c 383). After ten years in that office (c 393) he abandoned the court and retired to the desert of Skete as a hermit. He remained a hermit for the rest of his life, living in various places in Egypt, always weeping over the feebleness of Arcadius and the foolishness of Honorius. He reposed at the rock of Tröe near Memphis.) (Note: "At Scete, a mountain in Egypt, St. Arsenius, a deacon of the Roman church. In the time of Theodosius, he retired into a wilderness, where, endowed with every virtue and shedding continual tears, he yielded his soul to God.") (see also: May 8)
- Saint Felix of Verona (Felicinus, Felice), Bishop of Verona in Italy, venerated from ancient times as a saint.
- Saint Symmachus, Pope of Rome (514) (Note: Born in Sardinia, he became Pope of Rome in 498. Energetic and competent, despite the activities and accusations of enemies, he built many churches in Rome.) (Note: "At Rome, pope St. Symmachus, who for a long time had much to bear from a faction of schismatics. At last, distinguished by holiness, he went to God.")
- Saint Ambrose Autpertus, a Frankish Benedictine abbot (c. 778) (Note: Born in France, he went to Italy as an envoy and visited the monastery of St Vincent near Benevento, where he became a monk. Eventually he became abbot.)
- Saint Jerome of Pavia, Bishop of Pavia in Italy (787)
- Saint Aurea of Córdoba (Aura), a nun at Santa María de Cuteclara de Córdoba, martyred by beheading (856) (Note: Born in Cordoba in Spain and a daughter of Muslim parents, in her widowhood she became a Christian and a nun at Cuteclara, where she remained for more than twenty years. She was then denounced as a Christian by her own family and beheaded.) (Note: "At Cordova, St. Aurea, virgin, who repented of a fault she had committed, and in a second combat overcame the enemy by the shedding of her blood.")

== Post-Schism Orthodox saints ==
- Blessed Romanus of Ryazan, Prince of Ryazan (1270) (Note: See: (in Russian) Роман Ольгович. Википедии. (Russian Wikipedia).)
- Venerable Paisius of Kiev Far Caves (14th century)
- Blessed King Stefan Lazarević of Serbia (1427), and his mother St. Milica of Serbia (Eugenia in schema) (1405)
- Saint Sophronius (Smirnov), Archimandrite, of Svyatogorsk Monastery (1921) (Note: See: (in Russian) Софроний (Смирнов). Википедии. (Russian Wikipedia).)

== Other commemorations ==
- Icon of the Most Holy Theotokos "Umileniye" ("of Tender Feeling") of Diveyevo Convent (1885) (see also: July 28)
- Uncovering of the relics (1903) of Venerable Seraphim of Sarov, Wonderworker (1833)
- Commemoration of the miracle (1944) of Hieromartyr Charalampus (202), who saved the residents of Erana-Filiatra in Messinia from certain death.
- Synaxis of the Saints of Kursk.
- Repose of Hiero-Schemamonk Anthony of Valaam (1862)
- Repose of Blessed Abbot Nilus, of St. Nilus of Sora Monastery (1870) (Note: See: (in Russian) Нило-Сорская пустынь. Википедии. (Russian Wikipedia).)
- Repose of Elder John, of St. Nilus of Sora Monastery (1903)
- Repose of Archimandrite Nektary (Chernobyl) of Jerusalem (2000)

== Icon gallery ==
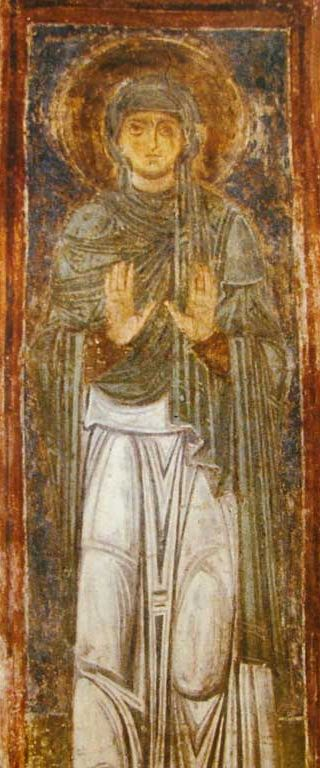
Venerable Macrina the Younger.

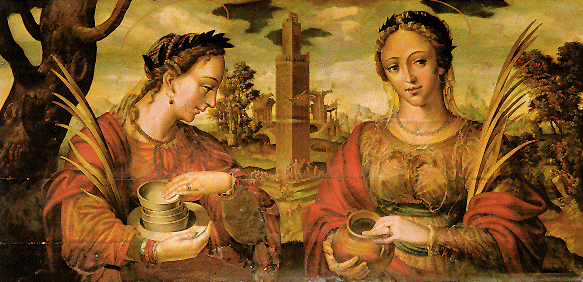
Sts. Justa and Rufina of Seville.

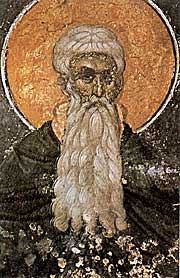
St. Arsenius the Great of Scetis.

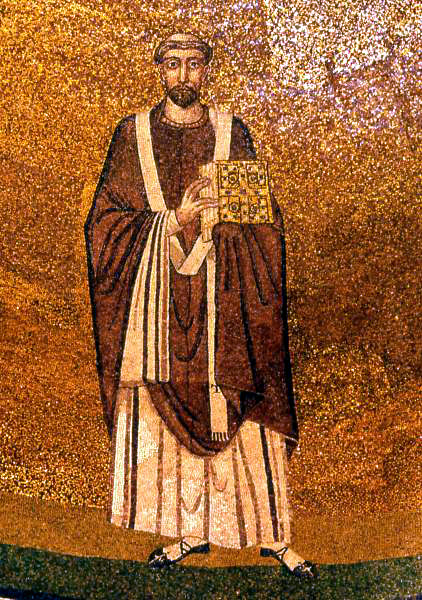
St. Symmachus, Pope of Rome.

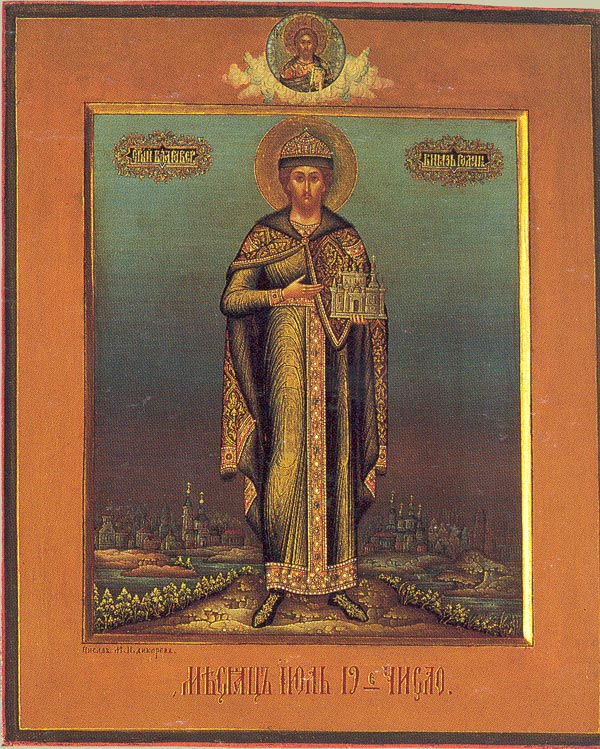
St. Roman of Ryazan.

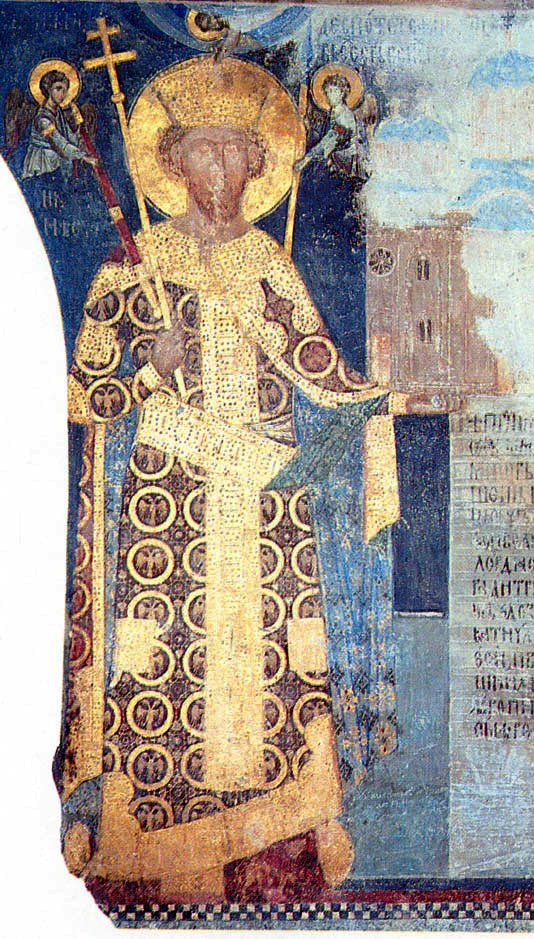
Blessed King Stefan Lazarević of Serbia.

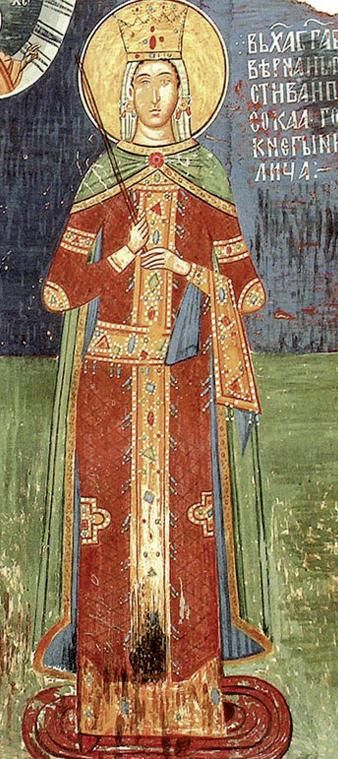
St. Milica of Serbia (Eugenia in schema).

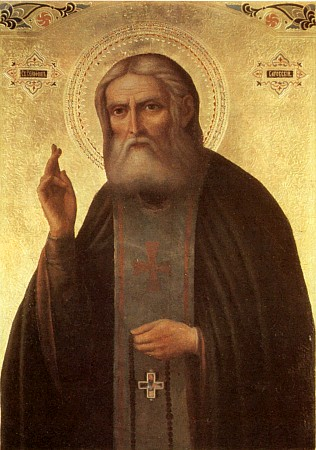
Venerable Seraphim of Sarov.

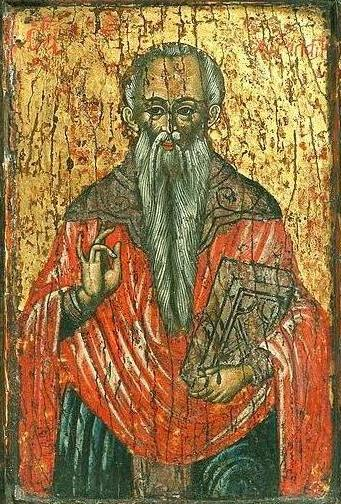
Hieromartyr Charalampus, Bishop of Magnesia in Asia Minor.

== Sources ==
- July 19/August 1. Orthodox Calendar (PRAVOSLAVIE.RU).
- August 1 / July 19. HOLY TRINITY RUSSIAN ORTHODOX CHURCH (A parish of the Patriarchate of Moscow).
- July 19. OCA - The Lives of the Saints.
- July 19. The Year of Our Salvation - Holy Transfiguration Monastery, Brookline, Massachusetts.
- The Autonomous Orthodox Metropolia of Western Europe and the Americas (ROCOR). St. Hilarion Calendar of Saints for the year of our Lord 2004. St. Hilarion Press (Austin, TX). p. 53.
- The Nineteenth Day of the Month of July. Orthodoxy in China.
- July 19. Latin Saints of the Orthodox Patriarchate of Rome.
- The Roman Martyrology. Transl. by the Archbishop of Baltimore. Last Edition, According to the Copy Printed at Rome in 1914. Revised Edition, with the Imprimatur of His Eminence Cardinal Gibbons. Baltimore: John Murphy Company, 1916. pp. 213–214.
- Rev. Richard Stanton. A Menology of England and Wales, or, Brief Memorials of the Ancient British and English Saints Arranged According to the Calendar, Together with the Martyrs of the 16th and 17th Centuries. London: Burns & Oates, 1892. pp. 347–348.

Greek Sources

- Great Synaxaristes: (in Greek) 19 ΙΟΥΛΙΟΥ. ΜΕΓΑΣ ΣΥΝΑΞΑΡΙΣΤΗΣ.
- (in Greek) Συναξαριστής. 19 Ιουλίου. ECCLESIA.GR. (H ΕΚΚΛΗΣΙΑ ΤΗΣ ΕΛΛΑΔΟΣ).
- (in Greek) 19/07/2026. Ορθόδοξος Συναξαριστής.

Russian Sources

- (in Russian) 1 августа (19 июля). Православная Энциклопедия под редакцией Патриарха Московского и всея Руси Кирилла (электронная версия). (Orthodox Encyclopedia - Pravenc.ru).
- (in Russian) 19 июля по старому стилю / 1 августа по новому стилю. СПЖ "Союз православных журналистов". 2026.
- (in Russian) 19 июля (ст.ст.) 1 августа 2026 (нов. ст.). Русская Православная Церковь Отдел внешних церковных связей. (DECR).
