= Erana =

Erana can refer to:

- Erana (Cilicia), a town of ancient Cilicia, now in Turkey
- Erana (Messenia), a town of ancient Messenia, Greece
- List of Quest for Glory characters § Erana, a fictional character in the Quest for Glory computer game series
