= July 17 (Eastern Orthodox liturgics) =

Day in the Eastern Orthodox liturgical calendar

Eastern Orthodox liturgical calendar
July 16	July 17	July 18
July 17 O.S. ≍ July 30 N.S. July 17 N.S ≍ July 4 O.S.

An Eastern Orthodox cross

July 17 in Eastern Orthodox liturgical calendars is a feast day and a day of commemoration of saints and martyrs. Although some Orthodox churches use the Revised Julian Calendar and others use the traditional Julian calendar, the fixed commemorations for their respective July 17 are broadly the same, no matter which calendar is used. (Note: Despite the dates being the same, the days to which they refer typically differ by 13 days. The notation Old Style or O.S. is sometimes used to indicate a date in the traditional Julian Calendar (the "Old Calendar"). The notation New Style or N.S. indicates a date in the Revised Julian calendar (the "New Calendar").)

== Saints ==
- Great martyr Marina (Margaret) of Antioch in Pisidia (4th century) (Note: "THIS Margaret is one of the most widely venerated Saints of the Church, East and West, but nothing is certainly known of her beyond the fact that she was a maiden who suffered death for Christ at Antioch. In the East she is called The Great-Martyr Marina, which name, like Margaret, signifieth a pearl; and her feast is kept on July 12th. From the East her fame spread to the West, and in the seventh century her name, changed to Margaret, appeared in an English Litany. During the middle ages she came to be much beloved throughout Europe, and was venerated as one of the Fourteen Holy Helpers, as such being invoked against demoniac possession, and by women in childbirth, and by those who were fearful. And hers was one of the voices which encouraged Joan of Arc in her struggle against evil and injustice. In 908 her reputed relicks were stolen from Antioch, and brought to Europe, and finally enshrined in the Cathedral of Montefiascone. At some late date her so-called Acts were written, but these constitute a symbolic naarative concerning the overcoming of evil by Christian simplicity and innocence, and therefore are not regarded as a purely factual account.") (Note: Name days celebrated today include: Marina (Μαρίνα).)
- Saint Euphrasius of Ionopolis, Bishop.
- Venerable Apostles of the Slavs: Cyril and Methodius, Clement of Ohrid, Sava, Angelar, Gorazd and Nahum of Ochrid. (see also: May 11, July 27)

== Pre-Schism Western saints ==
- The Holy Martyrs of Scillium beheaded in Carthage (180): (Note: Twelve martyrs, seven men and five women, who suffered at Scillium in North Africa under Septimius Severus. Their names are: Speratus, Narzales, Cythinus, Veturius, Felix, Acyllinus, Laetantius, Januaria, Generosa, Vestina, Donata and Secunda. The official Acts of these martyrs still exist.) (Note: "At Carthage, the birthday of the holy Scillitan martyrs Speratus, Narzales, Cythinus, Veturius, Felix, Acyllinus, Laetantius, Januaria, Generosa, Vestina, Donata, and Secunda. By order of the prefect Saturninus, after their first confession of the faith, they were sent to prison, nailed to pieces of wood, and finally beheaded. The relics of Speratus, with the bones of blessed Cyprian and the head of the martyr St. Pantaleon, were carried from Africa into France, and religiously placed in the basilica of St. John the Baptist at Lyons.")

- Martyrs Speratus and Veronica, Nartzalus, Cittinus, Veturius, Felix, Aquilinus, Laetantius, Januaria, Generosa, Vestia, Donata, and Secunda.

- Saint Marcellina, born in Rome, she was the elder sister of St Ambrose of Milan and St Satyrus (398) (Note: She became a nun in 353. Her remains are enshrined in Milan.) (Note: "At Milan, the virgin St. Marcellina, sister of the blessed bishop Ambrose, who received the religious veil from pope Liberius in the basilica of St. Peter at Rome. Her sanctity is attested by St. Ambrose in his writings.")
- Venerable Alexios the Man of God, in Rome (411) (Note: A saint originally distinguished by the title of 'the man of God'. The son of a Roman senator, in order to serve God in humility, he fled from his parental home disguised as a beggar. He set sail for Edessa where after seventeen years an Icon of the Mother of God proclaimed him 'the man of God'. He fled again and eventually returned to Rome and for years lived unrecognised as a beggar in his own home. After his repose a mysterious voice again proclaimed him 'the man of God'.) (Note: "AT Rome, St. Alexius, confessor, son of the senator Euphemian. Leaving his spouse untouched the night of his marriage, he withdrew from his house, and after a long pilgrimage returned to Rome, where he was for seventeen years harbored in his father's house as an unknown beggar, thus deluding the world by a new device. But after his death, becoming known through a voice heard in the churches of the city, and by his own writing, he was, under the Sovereign Pontiff, Innocent I., translated to the church of St. Boniface, where he wrought many miracles.") (see also: March 17)
- Saint Generosus of Tivoli, venerated in Tivoli in Italy, where his relics are enshrined in the Cathedral.
- Saint Cynllo, a British saint to whom several churches are dedicated in Wales (5th century)
- Saint Theodosius of Auxerre, Bishop of Auxerre in France c 507-516, who assisted in 511 at the First Council of Orléans (516)
- Saint Ennodius (Magnus Felix Ennodius), a Gallo-Roman who became Bishop of Pavia in Italy, Confessor (521) (Note: He was entrusted with two missions to Constantinople in connection with the Eutychian controversy. An Orthodox poet, his hymns are very edifying.)
- Saint Frédégand (Frégô), born in Ireland, he was a disciple of St Foillan, and became a monk and Abbot of Kerkelodor Abbey near Antwerp in Belgium (c. 740)
- Saint Turninus, a priest from Ireland who worked with St Foillan in Holland, and also near Antwerp in Belgium (8th century) Almost certainly the same as Saint Fredigand.
- Child-martyr Prince Kenelm of Wales, son of King Coenwulf of Mercia in England, murdered in the forest of Clent and buried in Winchcombe (c. 821)
- Saint Andrew Zorard, born in Poland, he lived as a hermit on Mount Zobar in Hungary (c. 1010)

== Post-Schism Orthodox saints ==
- Saint Timothy, Fool-for-Christ, of Svyatogorsk, (Note: See: (in Russian) Святогорский Успенский монастырь (Пушкинские Горы). Википедии. (Russian Wikipedia).) near Pskov (1563)
- Venerable Irenarchus, Abbot of Solovetsky Monastery (1628) (Note: See: (in Russian) Иринарх Соловецкий. Википедии. (Russian Wikipedia).)
- Venerable Leonid, founder of Ust-Neduma Monastery in Vologda, Abbot (1654) (Note: See: (in Russian) Леонид Устьнедумский. Википедии. (Russian Wikipedia).)

=== New martyrs and confessors ===
- Royal Martyrs of Russia: Martyrdom of the Romanovs (17 July 1918) (see also: July 4)

== Other commemorations ==
- Translation of the relics of St. Lazarus the Wonderworker, of Mt. Galesion, near Ephesus (1054) (see also: November 7, July 18)
- Icon of the Mother of God of Sviatogorsk (1569)
- Slaying of Bishop John (Bulin) of Pechersk Pskov Caves (1941) (Note: See: (in Russian) Иоанн (Булин). Википедии. (Russian Wikipedia).)
- Glorification (1996) and translation of the relics (2000) of St. Gabriel (Zyryanov) of Seven Lakes Monastery in Kazan, and of Pskov-Eleazar Monastery in Pskov (1915) (Note: See: (in Russian) Гавриил (Зырянов). Википедии. (Russian Wikipedia).) (see also: September 24)
- Second finding of the relics (1998) of St. Alexander of Svir (1533)

== Icon gallery ==
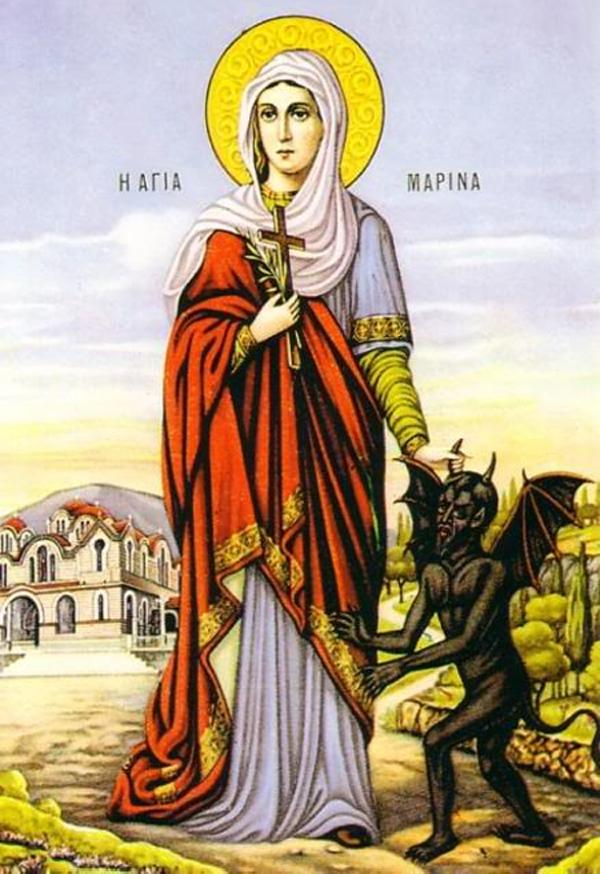
St. Marina the Great Martyr.

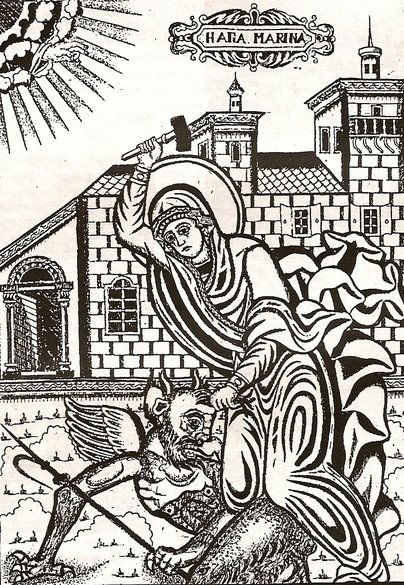
St. Marina the Great Martyr, depicted beating a demon with a hammer (Greece, 1858).

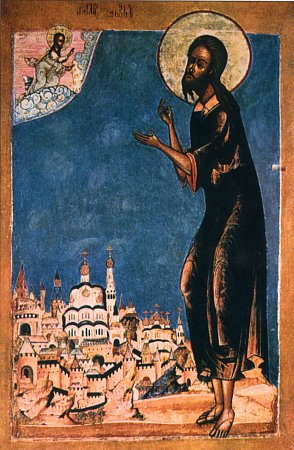
Venerable Alexios the Man of God.

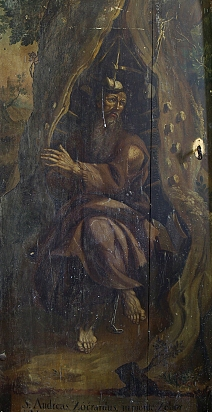
St. Andrew Zorard (Svorad).

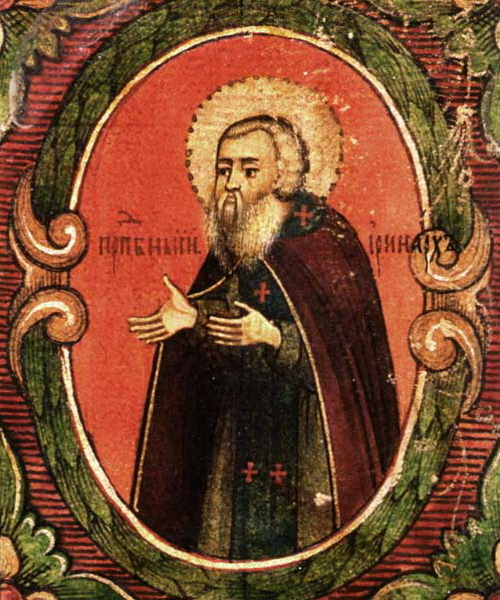
Venerable Irenarchus, Abbot of Solovetsky Monastery.

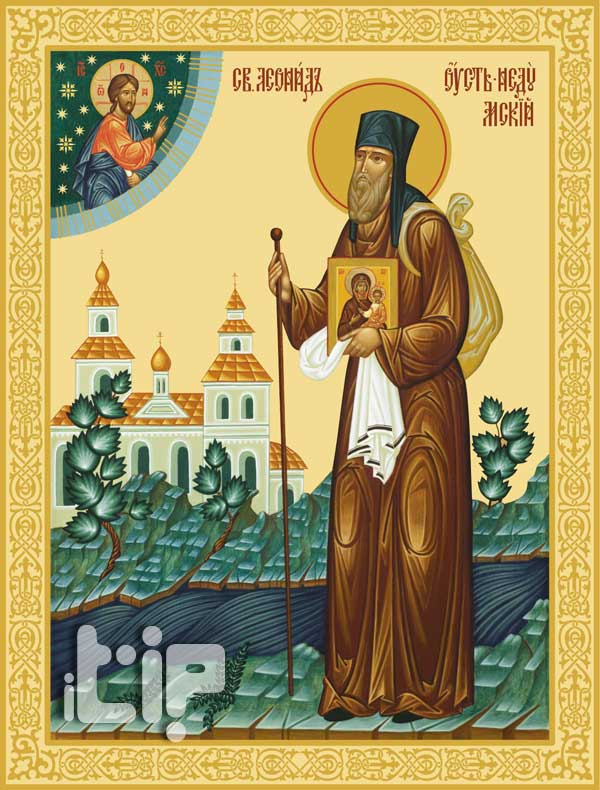
Venerable Leonid, founder of Ust-Neduma Monastery in Vologda.

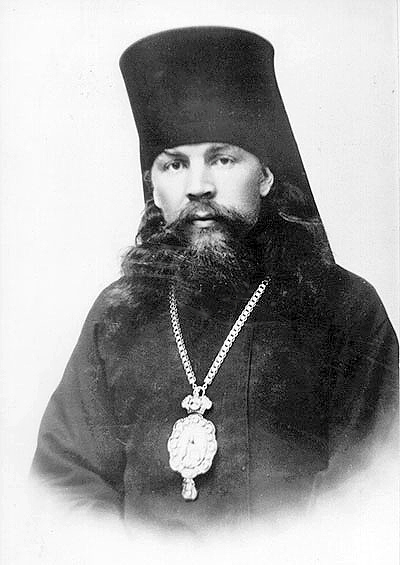
Bishop John (Bulin) of Pskov-Caves Monastery.

== Sources ==
- July 17/July 30. Orthodox Calendar (PRAVOSLAVIE.RU).
- July 30 / July 17. HOLY TRINITY RUSSIAN ORTHODOX CHURCH (A parish of the Patriarchate of Moscow).
- July 17. OCA - The Lives of the Saints.
- July 17. The Year of Our Salvation - Holy Transfiguration Monastery, Brookline, Massachusetts.
- The Autonomous Orthodox Metropolia of Western Europe and the Americas (ROCOR). St. Hilarion Calendar of Saints for the year of our Lord 2004. St. Hilarion Press (Austin, TX). p. 53.
- The Seventeenth Day of the Month of July. Orthodoxy in China.
- July 17. Latin Saints of the Orthodox Patriarchate of Rome.
- The Roman Martyrology. Transl. by the Archbishop of Baltimore. Last Edition, According to the Copy Printed at Rome in 1914. Revised Edition, with the Imprimatur of His Eminence Cardinal Gibbons. Baltimore: John Murphy Company, 1916. pp. 210–211.
- Rev. Richard Stanton. A Menology of England and Wales, or, Brief Memorials of the Ancient British and English Saints Arranged According to the Calendar, Together with the Martyrs of the 16th and 17th Centuries. London: Burns & Oates, 1892. p. 345.

Greek Sources

- Great Synaxaristes: (in Greek) 17 ΙΟΥΛΙΟΥ. ΜΕΓΑΣ ΣΥΝΑΞΑΡΙΣΤΗΣ.
- (in Greek) Συναξαριστής. 17 Ιουλίου. ECCLESIA.GR. (H ΕΚΚΛΗΣΙΑ ΤΗΣ ΕΛΛΑΔΟΣ).
- (in Greek) 17/07/2020. Ορθόδοξος Συναξαριστής.

Russian Sources

- (in Russian) 30 июля (17 июля). Православная Энциклопедия под редакцией Патриарха Московского и всея Руси Кирилла (электронная версия). (Orthodox Encyclopedia - Pravenc.ru).
- (in Russian) 17 июля по старому стилю / 30 июля по новому стилю. СПЖ "Союз православных журналистов". 2020.
- (in Russian) 17 июля (ст.ст.) 30 июля 2020 (нов. ст.). Русская Православная Церковь Отдел внешних церковных связей. (DECR).
