= Exochiko =

Exochiko may refer to two places in Greece:

- Exochiko, Koroni, a village in Koroni municipal unit, southern Messenia
- Exochiko, Filiatra a village in Filiatra municipal unit, western Messenia
