= Plati, Messenia =

Plati Πλάτη
- Community
- Location within Greece
- Coordinates: 37°10.2′N 21°39.8′E
- Country: Greece
- Administrative region: Peloponnese
- Regional unit: Messenia
- Municipality: Trifylia
- Municipal unit: Filiatra

Population (2021)
  - Community: 53
- Time zone: UTC+2 (EET)
  - Summer (DST): UTC+3 (EEST)

Plati (Greek: Πλάτη, before 1956: Καναλουπού - Kanaloupou) is a village in the municipal unit of Filiatra, Messenia, Greece. It is situated at the western foot of the Kyparissia Mountains, at an elevation of 300 metres (980 ft). It is 2 kilometres (1.2 mi) southwest of Perdikoneri, 7 kilometres (4.3 mi) east of Filiatra and 9 kilometres (5.6 mi) south of Kyparissia. The village is surrounded mainly by farmlands.

== Population ==
Year	Population
1690	127
1981	170
1991	226
2001	174
2011	71
2021	53

== History ==
According to the Venetian census of 1690, it had a population of 127. Springs supplying water to Filiatra emanate from Plati, where three watermills were located.

== See also ==
- List of settlements in Messenia
