= November 7 (Eastern Orthodox liturgics) =

Day in the Eastern Orthodox liturgical calendar

Eastern Orthodox liturgical calendar
November 6	November 7	November 8
November 7 O.S. ≍ November 20 N.S. November 7 N.S ≍ October 25 O.S.

An Eastern Orthodox cross

November 7 in Eastern Orthodox liturgical calendars is a feast day and a day of commemoration of saints and martyrs. Although some Orthodox churches use the Revised Julian Calendar and others use the traditional Julian calendar, the fixed commemorations for their respective November 7 are broadly the same, no matter which calendar is used. (Note: Despite the dates being the same, the days to which they refer typically differ by 13 days. The notation Old Style or O.S. is sometimes used to indicate a date in the traditional Julian Calendar (the "Old Calendar"). The notation New Style or N.S. indicates a date in the Revised Julian calendar (the "New Calendar").)

== Saints ==
- 33 Martyrs of Melitene (290): (Note: "At Melitine, in Armenia, the martyrdom of the Saints Hieron, Meander, Hesychius, and thirty others, who were crowned in the persecution of Diocletian, under the governor Lysias.")

- Hieron, Hesychius, Nicander, Athanasius, Mamas, Barachius, Callinicus, Theogenes, Nicon, Longinus, Theodore, Valerius, Xanthius, Theodulus, Callimachus, Eugene, Theodochus, Ostrychius, Epiphanius, Maximian, Ducitius, Claudian, Theophilus, Gigantius, Dorotheus, Theodotus, Castrychius, Anicetus, Theomelius, Eutychius, Hilarion, Diodotus, and Amonitus.

- Martyrs Matronian and Anthony, brothers of martyr Hieron, at Melitene (290)
- Saint Gregory, brother of St. Gregory the Wonderworker (3rd century)
- Martyrs Auctus, Taurion, and Thessaloniki, at Amphipolis in Macedonia.
- Martyr Theodotus of Ancyra (303) (see also: May 18)
- Martyr Alexander of Thessalonica (c. 305)
- Martyrs Melasippus, Cassina, their son Antoninus, and 40 children converted by their martyrdom, at Ancyra (363)
- Venerable Ambrosios.
- Saint Athenodorus.
- Venerable Lazarus the Wonderworker, of Mt. Galesion, near Ephesus (1054) (see also: July 17, July 18)

== Pre-Schism Western saints ==
- Saint Prosdocimus, first Bishop of Padua in Italy (c. 100) (Note: "AT Padua, the demise of St. Prosdocimus, first bishop of that city, who was ordained bishop by the blessed apostle Peter, and sent thither to preach the word of God, where, celebrated for many virtues and prodigies, he happily ended his life.")
- Saint Amaranthus, a martyr venerated in Albi in the south of France (3rd century) (Note: "The same day, St. Amaranthus, martyr, who was buried in the city of Albi, after the termination of combats faithfully sustained, but lives in eternal glory.")
- Saint Rufus of Metz, an early Bishop of Metz in France, and Confessor, he was bishop for some twenty-nine years (c. 400)
- Saint Herculanus of Perugia, Martyr-Bishop of Perugia in Italy, beheaded by soldiers of Totila of the Ostrogoths (549) (see also: March 1)
- Saint Congar of Congresbury (Cumgar, Cyngar), founder of monasteries in Badgworth, Congresbury in Somerset, and in Llangennith in Wales (6th century) (Note: He was buried in Congresbury which was named after him.) (Note: "ST. CUNGAR, also called DOCUNUS, was a holy, religious man, who obtained a gift of land at Cungresbury, in Somerset, from King Ina, about the year 711. There he founded a house for twelve Regular Canons, which he dedicated in honour of the Holy Trinity. Afterwards, St. Cungar retired to Glamorganshire, and founded an abbey near the sea-coast, known by his name of St. Docunus, and thence passed to his everlasting rest.")
- Saint Tremorus of Brittany, infant son of St Triphina, he was the patron saint of Carhaix (6th century)
- Saint Gebetrude (Gertrude), third Abbess of Remiremont Abbey in France (c. 675)
- Saint Raverranus, Bishop of Séez in France (682)
- Saint Gertrude of Remiremont, granddaughter of St Romaricus, and Abbess after her aunt at the convent of Saint-Mont near Remiremont, France (c. 690)
- Saint Florentius of Strasbourg, Bishop of Strasbourg (c. 693) (Note: Born in Ireland, he left his country for Alsace, now in France, and settled near Haselac, where he built a monastery. About the year 678 he became Bishop of Strasbourg, where he founded another monastery dedicated to St Thomas.)
- Saint Amarand, Abbot of Moissac Abbey in France, became Bishop of Albi (c. 700)
- Saint Willibrord (Clement), Archbishop of Utrecht, Apostle of Frisia (739) (Note: Born in Northumbria, he went to Ireland. From there he went to Friesland (c 690) accompanied by eleven other monks from England. Six years later he was consecrated bishop with the name of Clement and he founded his Cathedral in Utrecht. His work with the Frisians bore much fruit, as also in Heligoland and Denmark. He founded the monastery of Echternach in Luxembourg in 698 where his relics remain.) (Note: "In Friesland, the decease of St. Willibrord, bishop of Utrecht, who was consecrated bishop by the blessed Pope Sergius, and preached the Gospel in Friesland and Denmark.")
- Saint Blinlivet (Blevileguetus), the twenty-fifth Bishop of Vannes in Brittany (9th century)

== Post-Schism Orthodox saints ==
- Venerable Zosimas, founder of the Annunciation Monastery at Lake Vorbozomsk (1550) (Note: See: (in Russian) Зосима Ворбозомский. Википедии. (Russian Wikipedia).)

=== New martyrs and confessors ===
- New Hieromartyrs (1937):

- Cyril (Smirnov) Metropolitan of Kazan; (Note: See: (in Russian) Кирилл (Смирнов). Википедии. (Russian Wikipedia).)
- Michael Adamantov, Alexander Ilyinsky, Aleksander Kurmysh, Michael Gusev, (Note: See also: (in Russian) Гусев, Михаил Иванович. Википедии. (Russian Wikipedia).) Aleksander Krylov, Nikolai Romanovsky, Alexei Molchanov, Paul Borisoglebsky, Basil Krasnov, and Paulinus Staropolev, Priests;
- John Moshkov and Benjamin Vladimirsky, Deacons;
- Martyr Nicholas Filippov;
- Virgin-martyr Elisabeth Sidorova.

- New Hieromartyrs Sergius, Archbishop of Eletsk; Nicholas Troitsky, priest; and Martyr Gregory Yurenev (1937)
- New Hieromartyr Joseph (Petrovykh), Metropolitan of Petrograd (ru) (1937) (Note: He is considered the leader of the anti-Bolshevik church movement in the USSR and the founder of the Catacomb Church (Josephite movement).)

== Other commemorations ==
- Translation of the relics (1649) of St. Cyril (1532), founder of Novoezersk Monastery, Novgorod. (Note: See: (in Russian) Кирилл Новоезерский. Википедии. (Russian Wikipedia).)
- Icon of the Mother of God "Leaping with Joy" (Vzigranie) (1795)
- Ukaz № 362 of November 7/20, 1920, Russian Church Abroad formed. (Note: Patriarch Tikhon and the Holy Synod of the Russian Orthodox Church issued an encyclical ordering that the millions of Russian diaspora that had fled the Bolsheviks during the Russian Revolution organize a church authority outside of Soviet control, temporarily until the fall of communism in Russia. The Act of Canonical Communion of the Russian Orthodox Church Outside Russia with the Russian Orthodox Church Moscow Patriarchate reunited the two branches of the Russian Orthodox Church, with the accord being signed on 17 May 2007, which was the Feast of the Ascension of Christ that year.)
- Uncovering of the relics (1995) of hieromartyr Constantine Golubev (1918), presbyter (1995) (Note: See: (in Russian) Голубев, Константин Алексеевич. Википедии. (Russian Wikipedia).)

== Icon gallery ==
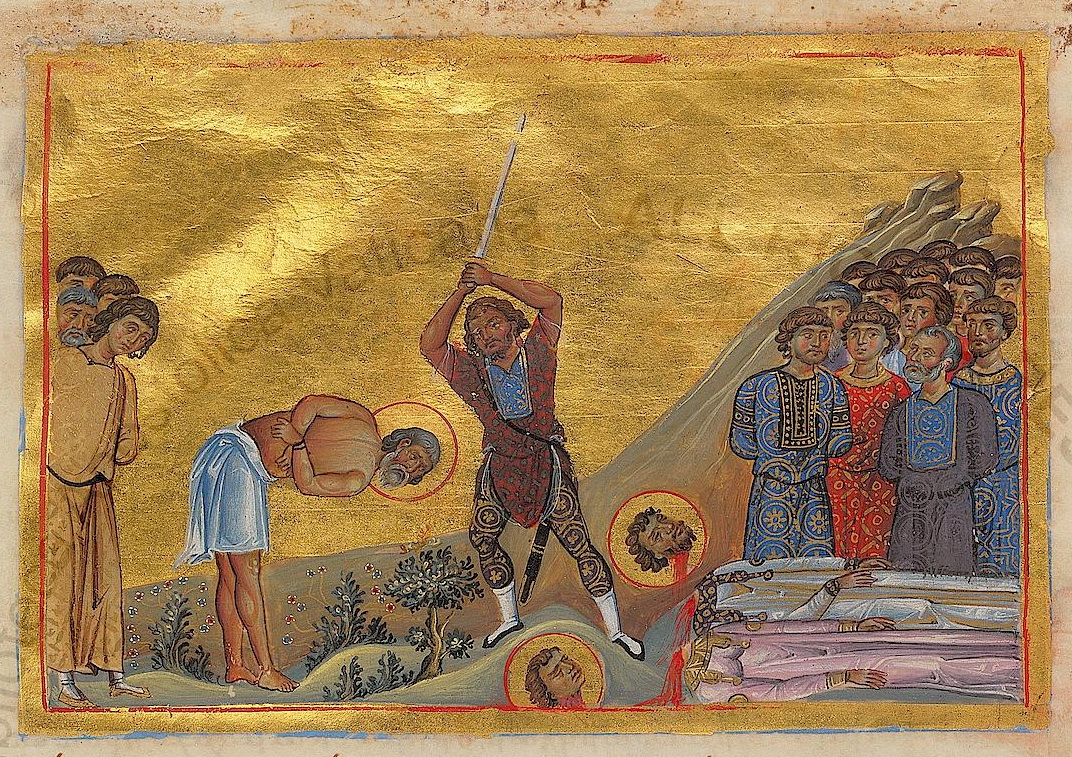
The 33 Martyrs of Melitene.
(Menologion of Basil II, 10th century).

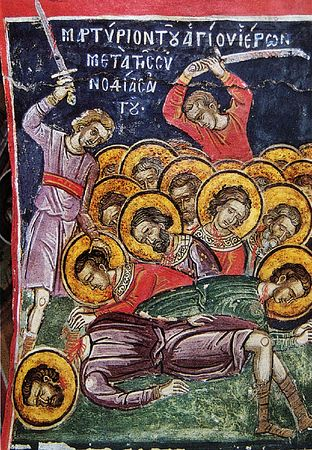
The 33 Martyrs of Melitene.
(Frescos in Dionysiou monastery).

Martyrs Auctus, Taurion, and Thessaloniki, at Amphipolis in Macedonia.
(Menologion of Basil II, 10th century).

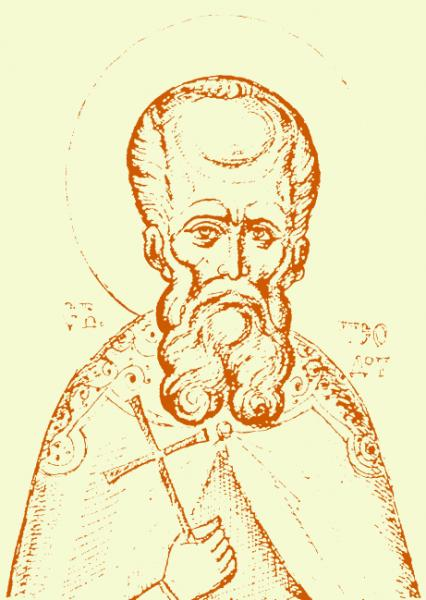
Martyr Theodotus of Ancyra.

Martyrs Melasippus, Cassina, their son Antoninus, at Ancyra.
(Menologion of Basil II, 10th century).

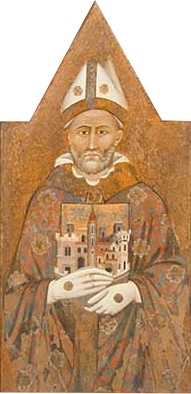
St Herculanus of Perugia.

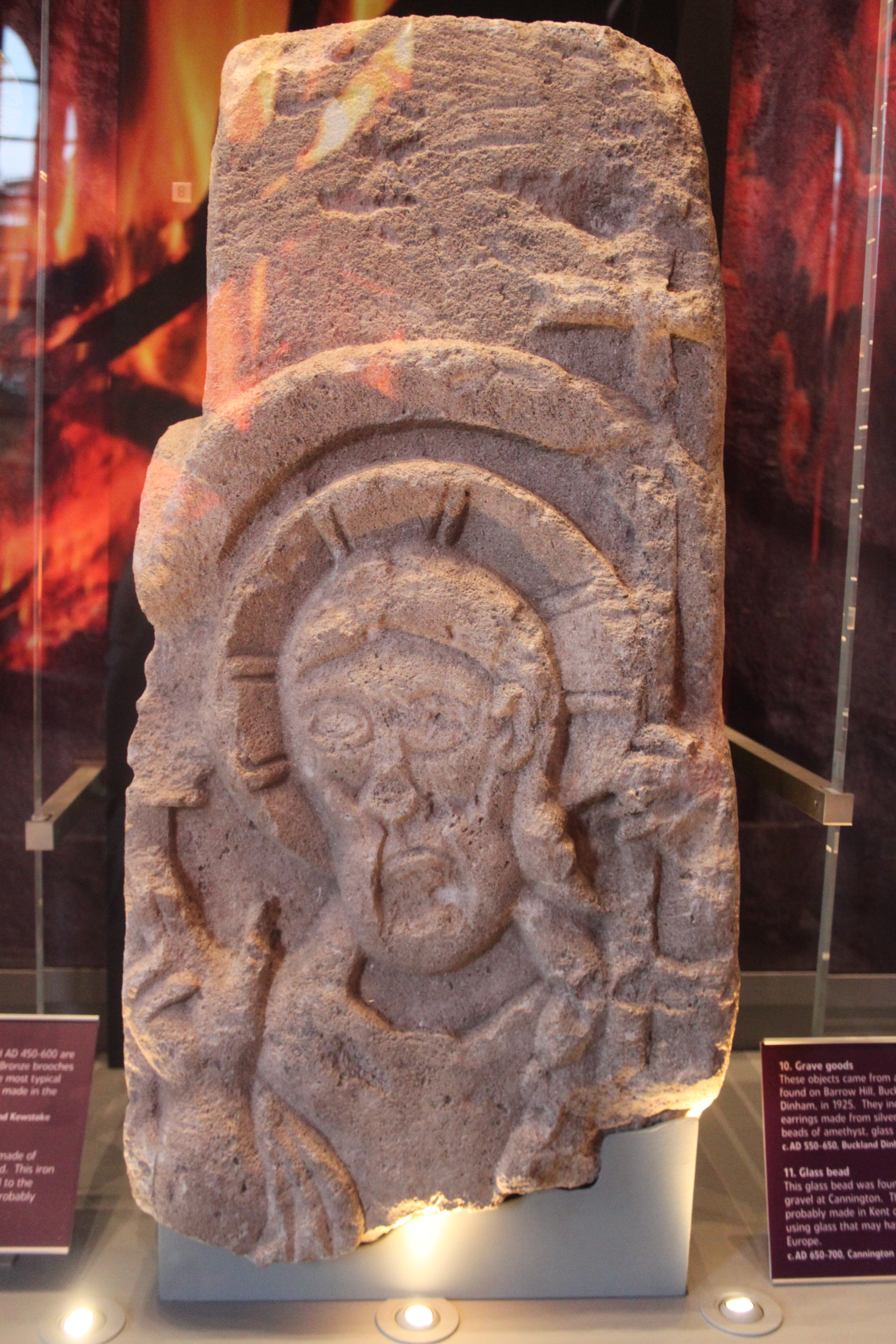
St. Congar of Congresbury at the Museum of Somerset.

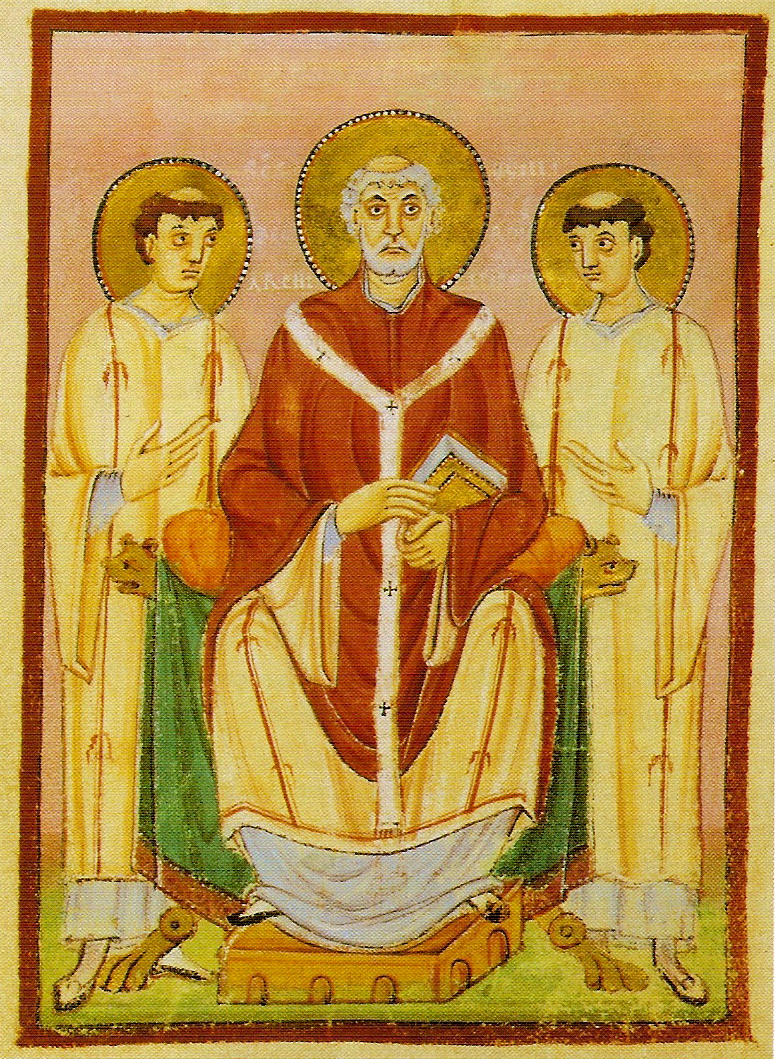
St Willibrord (Clement), Archbishop of Utrecht, Apostle of Frisia.

St. Zosimas, founder of the Annunciation Monastery at Lake Vorbozomsk.

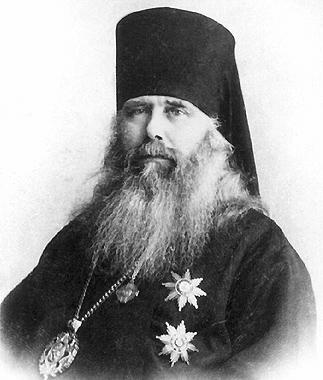
New Hieromartyr Cyril (Smirnov) Metropolitan of Kazan.

New Hieromartyr Cyril (Smirnov) Metropolitan of Kazan (in 1934).

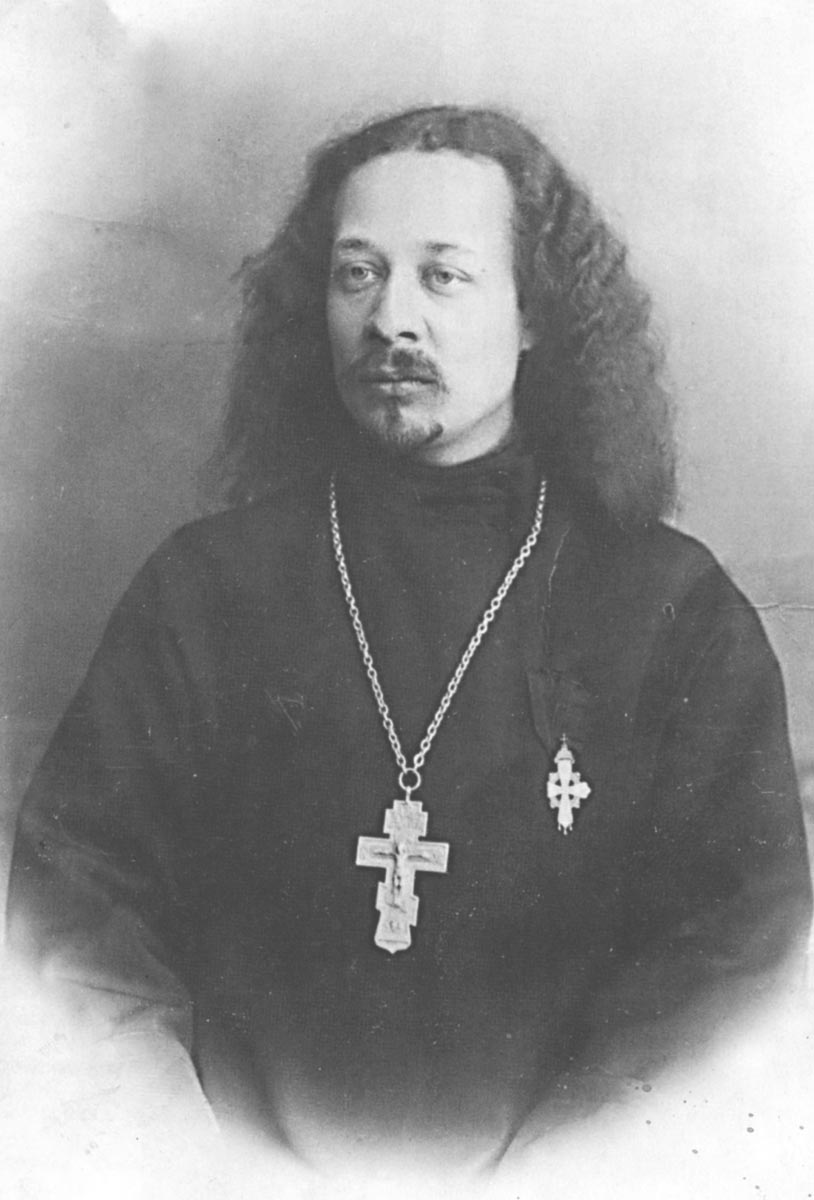
New Hieromartyr Michael Gusev, priest.

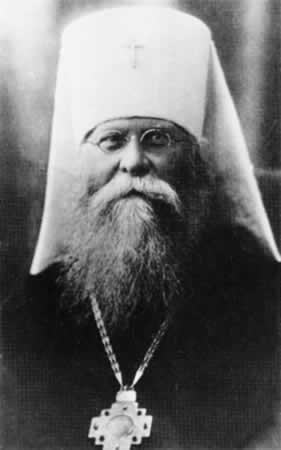
New Hieromartyr Joseph (Petrovykh), Metropolitan of Petrograd.

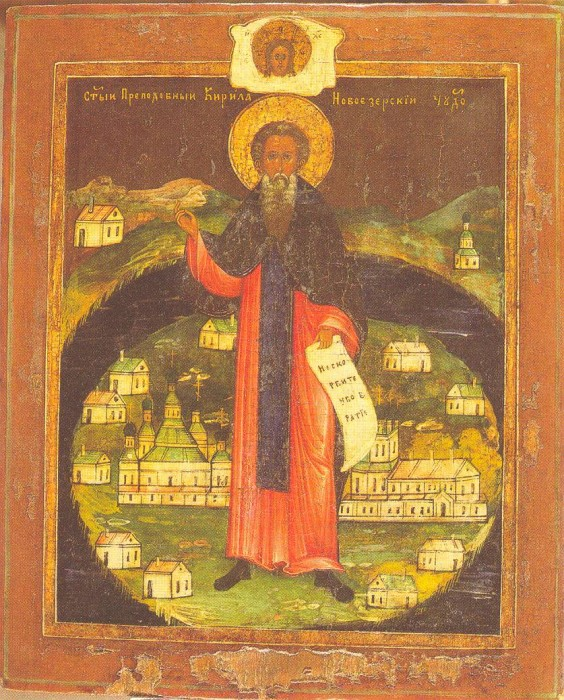
Venerable Cyril of Novoezersk.

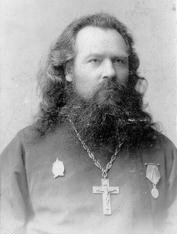
New Hieromartyr Constantine Golubev, Archpriest.

== Sources ==
- November 7/November 20. Orthodox Calendar (PRAVOSLAVIE.RU).
- November 20 / November 7. HOLY TRINITY RUSSIAN ORTHODOX CHURCH (A parish of the Patriarchate of Moscow).
- November 7. OCA - The Lives of the Saints.
- The Autonomous Orthodox Metropolia of Western Europe and the Americas (ROCOR). St. Hilarion Calendar of Saints for the year of our Lord 2004. St. Hilarion Press (Austin, TX). p. 83.
- The Seventh Day of the Month of November. Orthodoxy in China.
- November 7. Latin Saints of the Orthodox Patriarchate of Rome.
- The Roman Martyrology. Transl. by the Archbishop of Baltimore. Last Edition, According to the Copy Printed at Rome in 1914. Revised Edition, with the Imprimatur of His Eminence Cardinal Gibbons. Baltimore: John Murphy Company, 1916. pp. 343–344.
- Rev. Richard Stanton. A Menology of England and Wales, or, Brief Memorials of the Ancient British and English Saints Arranged According to the Calendar, Together with the Martyrs of the 16th and 17th Centuries. London: Burns & Oates, 1892. pp. 528–531.

Greek Sources

- Great Synaxaristes: (in Greek) 7 ΝΟΕΜΒΡΙΟΥ. ΜΕΓΑΣ ΣΥΝΑΞΑΡΙΣΤΗΣ.
- (in Greek) Συναξαριστής. 7 Νοεμβρίου. ECCLESIA.GR. (H ΕΚΚΛΗΣΙΑ ΤΗΣ ΕΛΛΑΔΟΣ).
- (in Greek) 07/11/2026. Ορθόδοξος Συναξαριστής.

Russian Sources

- (in Russian) 20 ноября (7 ноября). Православная Энциклопедия под редакцией Патриарха Московского и всея Руси Кирилла (электронная версия). (Orthodox Encyclopedia - Pravenc.ru).
- (in Russian) 7 ноября по старому стилю / 20 ноября по новому стилю. Русская Православная Церковь - Православный церковный календарь на 2026 год.
