= 33 martyrs of Melitene =

3rd-century Christian saints

33 Martyrs of Melitene
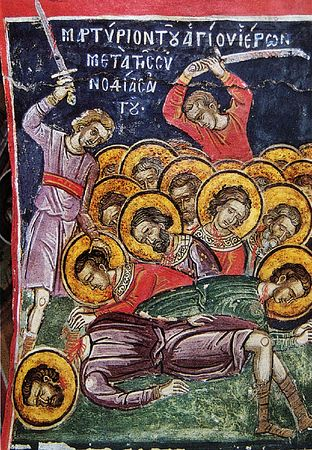

Holy Martyrs
- Venerated in: Eastern Orthodox Church
- Feast: November 7

The 33 Martyrs of Melitene were early Christian martyrs from Cappadocia who suffered under the persecution of the Roman Emperors Diocletian and Maximian in the early 3rd century, specifically around the year 290. The Roman emperors sent large military detachments, led by Lysias, to Cappadocia to suppress the spread of Christianity. These persecutions also served as an opportunity to recruit soldiers for the imperial army. They were executed in Melitene.

Among the martyrs was Saint Hieron, a Christian from Tyana in Cappadocia. He was a strong husbandman who refused to join the imperial army, despite attempts by Roman soldiers to persuade him. Hieron resisted, using his physical strength to drive the soldiers away with a wooden tool, causing them to flee in fear.

The 33 Martyrs of Melitene are venerated as saints by the Eastern Orthodox Church, with their feast day celebrated on November 7.

The hymns associated with their feast are the Apolytikion in the Fourth Tone and the Kontakion in the Fourth Tone, which are used during Vespers and other Orthodox services.

== Hieron ==
Hieron was born in Tyana, in Cappadocia. His mother, Stratonika, was devout and blind. Hieron cared for his mother and was passionate about Christianity from an early age. The Roman imperial army attempted to recruit him, but he refused, fearing that joining the army would force him to renounce his faith and sacrifice to idols. Hieron repeatedly rejected the Roman recruiters.

To avoid capture, Hieron hid in a cave with thirty-two other Christians. During this time, he had a vision foretelling his martyrdom.

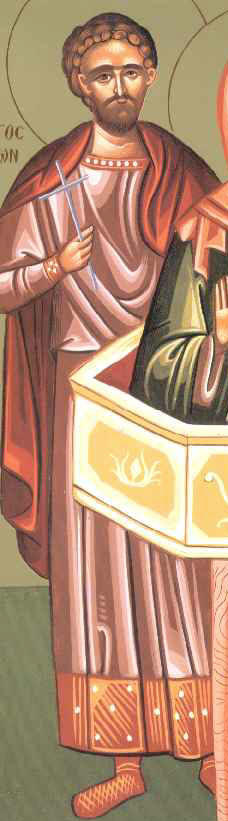
Eastern Orthodox Icon of St. Hieron, one of the 33 Martyrs of Melitene.

Hieron was eventually arrested along with other martyrs and taken to Melitene. In prison, Hieron and the other martyrs were tortured. All of the martyrs remained steadfast in their faith, except for Hieron's kinsman, Victor, who renounced Christianity after enduring torture.

Hieron was subjected to brutal torture, including having his hand cut off, being flogged and further beatings. Throughout their suffering, the martyrs chanted Psalm 118:1. Finally, Hieron was beheaded along with the other martyrs.

After his execution, a man named Chrysanthus purchased Hieron’s head, buried it, and later built a church in his honor. Hieron's severed hand was taken to his blind mother, who was later declared a saint and martyr. His relics were uncovered and enshrined in the church of Hagia Eirene during the reign of Emperor Justinian.

== Other Martyrs ==
The other 32 martyrs are named in alphabetical order: Amonitus, Anicletus, Athanasius, Barachius, Callimachus, Callinicus, Castrichius, Claudian, Diodotus, Dorotheus, Ducitius, Epiphanius, Eugene, Eutychius, Gigantius, Hesychius, Hilarion, Longinus, Mamas, Maximian, Nicander, Nikon, Ostrychius, Theodochus, Theodotus, Theodoulus, Theodore, Theogenes, Theophilius, Themelius, Valerius, Xanthius.
