= Lazaros of Mount Galesios =

Byzantine monk and stylite (c. 972/981 – 1053)

Saint Lazarus

Founder of Ephesus
- Born: 972; Magnesia, Roman Anatolia (modern-day Manisa, Turkey)
- Died: 1053; Ephesus, Roman Anatolia (modern-day Selçuk, İzmir, Turkey)
- Venerated in: Eastern Orthodox Church; Roman Catholic Church
- Feast: November 7, July 17

Saint Lazaros of Mount Galesios (Greek: Λάζαρος ὁ Γαλησιώτης, Lazaros ho Galēsiōtēs; c. 972/981 – 7 November 1053) was an 11th-century Byzantine monk and stylite, who founded a monastic community at Mount Galesios near Ephesus.

== Life ==
Lazaros, whose secular name was Leo, was born near Magnesia to a peasant family, and his original name was Leo (Λέων). The exact date of his birth is unknown; traditionally it has been calculated at c. 972, but a reference in a manuscript (Moscow, Hist. Mus. 369/353, fol. 220) records that he died at the age of 72, hence that he was born in c. 981.

After finishing his elementary schooling, he left his home and went to Attaleia to become a monk. Later he went to the famed Lavra of Saint Sabas in Palestine, before returning to his home region. He founded three monasteries at Mount Galesios near Ephesus, while he himself became a stylite and lived in a pillar. The monks in the monastic communities Lazaros founded lived in individual cells, rather than the cenobitic monasticism of most monasteries; they were even allowed to earn their own income through practicing a handicraft.

According to a vita of Lazaros of Mount Galesios written by his disciple Gregory the Cellarer, Lazaros climbed and descended Mount Argeas (now more commonly known as Mount Erciyes) in the depths of winter while singing the Psalms, as he encountered harsh weather and even a bear and attacking dogs.

When he reached [Mt.] Argeas, he wanted to climb it but he was stopped by those [who lived] there because it was winter. Lazaros, however, put all his hope in our Lord Jesus Christ and His mother and started to climb. When he was halfway up the mountain, [such] a [dense] fog came down around him, as he used to relate, that, even though he strained his eyes, he could not see to the right or left or anywhere else. He did not give up his attempt, however, but bent down and, using his hands to guide him, went on up.
While he was climbing like this, he met a bear, as he used to say, and neither he nor it sensed the approach of the other until they came [so close that] they bumped into each other. The only explanation for this was that it was a device of the Evil One intended to frighten him into turning back, or rather of God allowing [this] as a trial of his faith and hope. The [bear] came to a halt at their sudden collision and left the path, while Lazaros went on his way unhindered, heartily singing the Davidic psalms. When he had climbed up [to the top] he found that the door [of the chapel] had been securely barred. He opened it and went inside; when he had prayed, he came out, closed the door securely, and went down the mountain again.

== Hagiography ==
Lazaros's hagiography was written by his disciple, the kellarite Gregory; and reworked by the Patriarch of Constantinople, Gregory II of Cyprus, in the late 13th century. According to the description of Alexander Kazhdan, the hagiography "has few supernatural miracles but many vignettes rich in everyday details: the young Lazaros escaped sexual seduction in the house of a girl whom he accompanied to Chonae; Lazaros's corpse, with the help of the monk Cyril, signed the diatyposis for the monks; many thefts and quarrels, travels, and visits are described. Gregory focuses on local events, while Constantinople is depicted as a remote city teeming with danger".

== Sources ==
- Greenfield, Richard P. H., ed. (2000). The Life of Lazaros of Mt. Galesion: An Eleventh-Century Pillar Saint. Washington, DC: Dumbarton Oaks. ISBN 978-0-88402-272-5.
- Kazhdan, Alexander (1991). "Lazaros of Mount Galesios". In Kazhdan, Alexander (ed.). The Oxford Dictionary of Byzantium. Oxford and New York: Oxford University Press. p. 1198. ISBN 0-19-504652-8.
- Schadler, Peter (2011). "Gregory the Cellarer". In Thomas, David; Mallett, Alex (eds.). Christian-Muslim Relations: A Bibliographical History, Volume 3 (1050-1200). Leiden and Boston: BRILL. pp. 160–164. ISBN 978-90-04-195158.
- Vathi, Theodora (28 November 2003). Λάζαρος ο Γαλησιώτης. Encyclopaedia of the Hellenic World, Asia Minor (in Greek). Foundation of the Hellenic World.
