= Gundenis =

Saint Gundenis

Martyr and Virgin
- Died: 203; Carthage
- Venerated in: Roman Catholic Church
- Canonized: Pre-congregation
- Feast: 18 July

Gundenis was a virgin martyr. She suffered martyrdom during the persecutions of Septimius Severus.
