= Exochiko, Filiatra =

Exochiko Εξοχικό
- Community
- Location within Greece
- Coordinates: 37°11.3′N 21°35.7′E
- Country: Greece
- Administrative region: Peloponnese
- Regional unit: Messenia
- Municipality: Trifylia
- Municipal unit: Filiatra

Population (2021)
  - Community: 167
- Time zone: UTC+2 (EET)
  - Summer (DST): UTC+3 (EEST)

Exochiko (Greek: Εξοχικό, before 1957: Κατσίμπαλης – Katsimpalis) is a village in the municipal unit of Filiatra in western Messenia, Greece. Exochiko is situated near the Ionian Sea coast, at 60 m elevation. It is 4 km north of Filiatra, 10 km southwest of Kyparissia and 50 km northwest of Kalamata. The Greek National Road 9 (Pyrgos – Kyparissia – Pylos – Methoni) passes west of the village.

== Population ==
Year	Population
1950	240
1981	141
1991	196
2001	243
2011	179
2021	167

== History ==
The origin of the former name Katsimpalis may have been a Turkish local leader Katsibali (Kacibal, Kacibali?), or a companion of revolutionary leader Theodoros Kolokotronis that was named Katsibali. Exochiko was founded by Arcadians in the mid 19th century, most of these arrived from Alonistaina. Its residents are employed in agriculture including olive oil production, groves and greenhouses.

== See also ==
- List of settlements in Messenia
