= Goneri of Brittany =

Goneri of Brittany was a sixth-century hermit of the church in Britain.

Goneri lived as an exile to the world amongst the Breton people, a Celtic nation of northwestern France. It is recorded that his hermitage was situated near the community of Tréguier.

Saint Goneri of Brittany is commemorated 18 July in the Orthodox and Catholic Churches.

== See also ==
- Julian Maunoir, "Apostle of Brittany"
