= Fredigand of Deurne =

8th-century Irish missionary

Saint Fredigand of Deurne
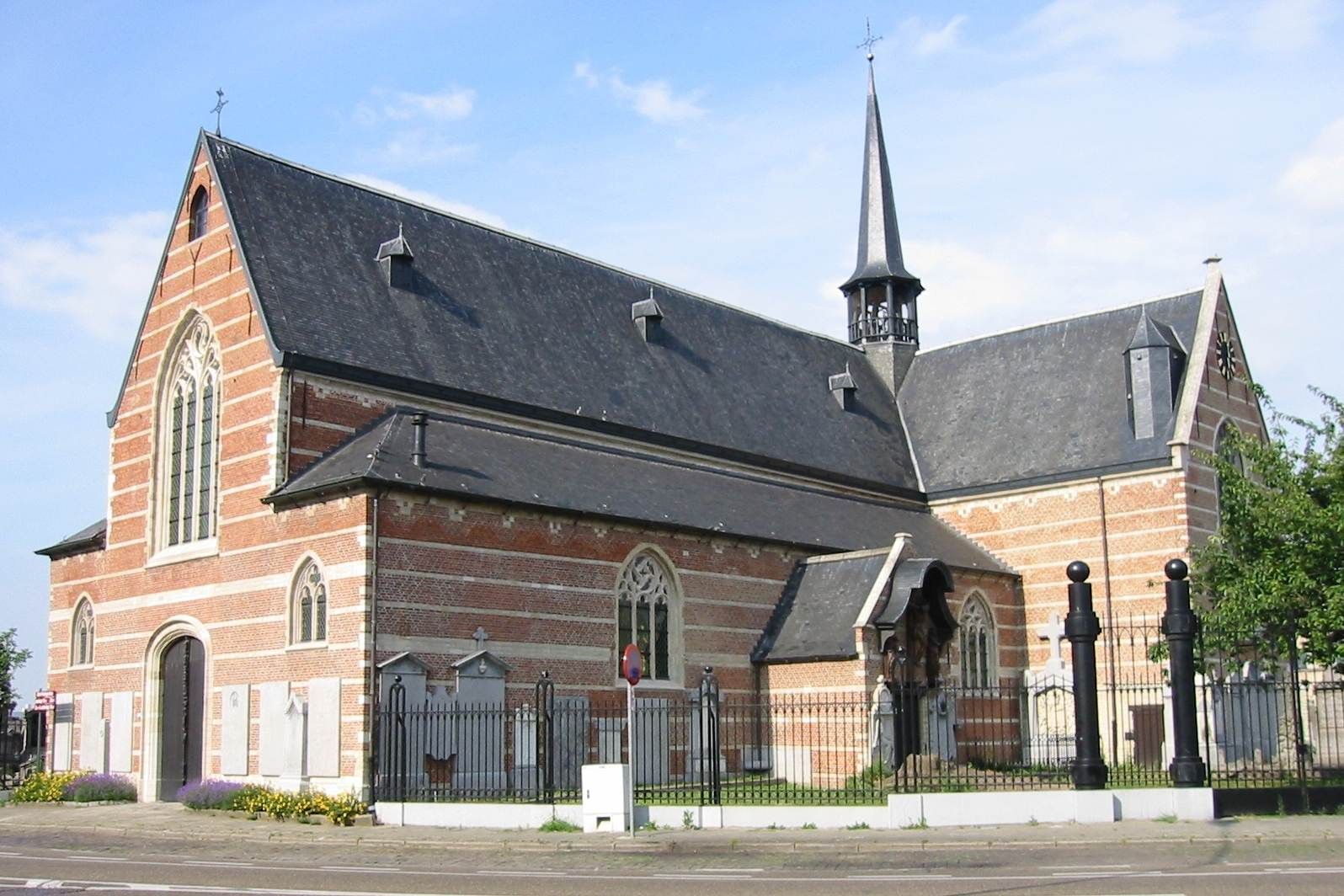
- Sint-FredegandusKerk in Deurne
- Born: 7th century Ireland
- Died: c. 740; Deurne, Belgium
- Feast: 17 July

Saint Fredigand of Deurne (or Frégaud, Frego, Fredegad, Fredegandus, Fridegandus of Turninum, Turne etc.; died c. 740) was an 8th-century Irish missionary in the territory around Antwerp in what is now Belgium. His feast day is 17 July.

== Life ==
Saint Frédégand was an Irish disciple of Saint Foillan. He became a missionary monk in the area near Antwerp today in Belgium, and was made abbot of Kerkelodor Abbey. He died around 740 in Deurne, Belgium. His feast day is 17 July.

== "Saint Turninus" ==
The hagiographer Alban Butler (1710–1773) wrote in his Lives of the Fathers, Martyrs, and Other Principal Saints, under July 17,

St. Turninus, C.
He was a holy Irish priest and monk, who coming with St. Foilan into the Netherlands, laboured with unwearied zeal in bringing souls to the perfect practice of Christian virtue. The territory about Antwerp reaped the chief fruit of his apostolic mission. He died there about the close of the eighth century. His relics were translated into the principality of Liege, and are honourably enshrined in a monastery situated on the Sambre. See Colgan MSS. ad 17. Jul.

The monks of St Augustine's Abbey, Ramsgate, wrote in their Book of Saints (1921),

Turninus (St.) (July 17)
(8th cent.) An Irish priest who worked as a missionary with Saint Foillan in the Netherlands, and more particularly in the vicinity of Antwerp.

John O'Hanlon notes that "In Butler's Lives of the Saints, and in the Circle of the Seasons, at the 17th of July, we find recorded St. Turninus, but this is evidently a mistake for St. Fredigandus."

== De Ram's account ==
Pierre François Xavier de Ram (1804–1865), in his translation and revision of Butler's Lives of the Fathers, Martyrs, and Other Principal Saints, replaced Butler's life of St. Turninus with a life of Saint Frégaud. He wrote,

SAINT FRÉGAUD, CONFESSOR.

End of seventh century.

Some writers believed that Saint Frégaud (Fredegandus) was born in the Netherlands; but it appears that he was originally from Ireland and among those who crossed the sea with Saint Foillan. Grammaye is wrong to give this Saint the title of bishop, while Molanus, after the most meticulous research, only grants him that of priest and confessor.

Father Henschenius believes that Saint Arnaud built a monastery in Deurne, near Antwerp, which was called Querquelodora, and that Saint Frégaud was its first superior. When the Normans ravaged Antwerp and its surroundings in 836, they also destroyed this monastery; but the body of the Saint, which had rested there until then, was taken before the arrival of these barbarians and transported to Moustiers, two leagues from Namur, where Saint Arnaud had also founded a convent in honor of Saint Peter.

Among the benefices of the former collegiate church of Moustier, there was a fairly considerable one under the invocation of Saint Frégaud. The person who received it was the pastor of the young canonesses and the servants of the chapter. Saint Frégaud is the patron saint of the village of Deurne, and his feast of July 17 is celebrated there. He was also honored at Saint-Omer in the Abbey of Saint-Bertin. Henri Costerius, having composed a life of the Saint in Flemish, presented it on July 31, 1595 to Bishop Torrentius and to the chapter of the cathedral of Antwerp, with a note in which he claimed that there were relics of the Saint, that he had sought at the abbey of Saint-Bertin, and that they had been discovered there under Gérard d'Hamericourt, bishop of Saint-Omer; but Torrentius refused to approve them.

== O'Hanlon's account ==
John O'Hanlon notes that, "Like many accounts regarding the early saints, those relating to St. Fredegandus are unsatisfactory, for want of consistency and agreement on particulars related. He is said to have flourished in the eight century, although other inferences may be drawn from the Acts which remain." O'Hanlon summarizes what is known,

This saint was an Irishman by birth, according to his ancient office recited at Deurne, as also in the opinion of Molanus, Miraeus, and Malbranq. He appears to have embraced the monastic state of life, and if it be true, that he was a native of Ireland, it seems most likely his profession was made in our country. According to all accounts, he was remarkable for his many virtues, even in early youth. He became a priest, when he had attained the requisite qualifications through age and study. He became a companion of St. Fursey, St. Foillan, and St. Ultan, when they left Ireland, to spread the Faith in the north-western Continental countries. However, nothing definite seems to be known regarding this connexion.

St. Fredegand is said to have been a companion of St. Foillan, where his mission in the Low Countries took place, and to have been like him an apostolical preacher. The district of Ryland appears to have been that selected by Fredegand for his special harvest of souls. According to the published Acts of our saint, the illustrious Willibrord had there built a small monastery about the year 700, and into this Fredegand entered as a monk; while his piety and diligence, in this state, caused him to be elected as Abbot over the community. He laboured with unwearied zeal to bring the people to a perfect practice of Christian virtue. At this period, also, Pepin of Herstal had obtained great victories over the Frisons, and through the ministry of St. Willibrord, many of these were brought over to embrace the Catholic faith. One of his captains was named Gommar, and it is stated, that St. Fredegand had many conversations on religious matters with him, so that in fine he became a great saint. It is likewise related, that St. Rumold was a companion and confidant of both.

The country about Antwerp was the chief scene of St. Fredigand's labours. It seems to have been assumed, that he belonged to the Benedictine Order; but this is more than doubtful, if he came in company with St. Fursey and other missionaries into France. The results of his preaching were very remarkable. Abundant fruits were gleaned, while personally he contended against the obstacles to sanctity, so that his eternal reward might be obtained. This holy man was greatly distinguished for his success in spreading the Gospel through those parts. St. Amand founded a monastery at Querquelodora at Duerne, and the Bollandists suppose, that St. Fredegand was set over it, but whether as Abbot, before Firminus or after his time, cannot well be determined. According to another account, in 726, a pious and wealthy man named Rohingus and his wife Bebelina bestowed the site on St. Willibrord, who there built a church in honour of the Apostles St. Peter and St. Paul. The monastery at Dorne, near Antwerp, is thought by some to have been the foundation of St. Fredegand; and, there he is said to have become a monk, while other writers state, that he presided over it as the first Abbot.

Before the Norman Invasion, Turninum was a fortified town, and it seems to have been approachable by ships. The site of this religious establishment was in a marshy place; yet vessels seem to have had access to it from the sea, before the present mounds or embankments had been erected on the Scheld. This place is said to have been more ancient than the stately city of Antwerp, which afterwards had been built near it, and where at present a truly magnificent Gothic cathedral, with a steeple 441 feet in height, dominates proudly over the streets and houses. The interior has five aisles, and the elevation of 360 feet, presents a wonderfully fine perspective. Noble churches and religious institutes still manifest the permanent character of that impression made on a free people, yet preserving the traditions of their fathers in the Faith, and observing well the precepts learned from their first teachers.

St. Fredigand died in the Netherlands, about the close of the seventh century, as has been generally believed. His relics formerly reposed in his monastery at Dorne, where they had been deposited. However, in the ninth century, the Normans made an irruption into this part of the country, and, in 836, they burned Turninum. and utterly destroyed that religious establishment. They also tore down the walls and towers of the city, killing numbers of the people, and bringing others away as slaves. Only a solitude remained. To guard the precious relics of our saint from sacrilege, in the time of the Norman devastations, they were translated to the collegiate church of St. Peter, at Monstier. This was built near the River Sambre, and it was situated about two leagues from Namur. Again, it has been stated, regarding the relics, that Adalard, superior of Sithieu, with Folquinus the Bishop, received St. Fredegand's remains, about A.D. 845s or 846. His relies were thus translated to the territory of Liege; but, after the Norman incursions, it may be inferred from accounts left us, that some relics of St. Fredigand still remained at Deurne. At Monstier, the chief remains were honourably enshrined in the monastery. St. Fredigand has been venerated as the special patron of Deurne. At St. Omer, in the diocese of Arras, St. Frégaud, confessor—as he is so called in French—had special honours also paid to his memory.

A long period had elapsed, after the translation of St. Fredegand's remains and the destruction of Deurne, until the reign of the Emperor Maximilian I., who reigned from 1493 until 1519. During that time, about the Festival of St. John the Baptist in summer, a great pestilence broke out at Deurne. The parish priest exhorted his people to have devotion towards their holy patron, and a new statue of St. Fredigand was ordered from a sculptor to be erected in their church. From the moment of its erection, the plague suddenly ceased. In gratitude for this favour, and mindful of their powerful intercessor before the throne of God, leave was obtained from the venerable bishop of Cambray, Jaques de Croy, to have a solemn annual procession with the Blessed Sacrament and the statue of St. Fredegand, on each recurring 1st of May. Soon the fame of miracles wrought through their patron's intercession caused numbers of persons to visit St. Fredegand's chapel, where they were cured of various diseases. In token of gratitude, white wands were left there, while different cases of curative miracles wrought were placed upon record, and these are apparently well authenticated.

== Sources ==
- Butler, Alban (1823), The Lives of the Irish Saints, Extracted from the Writings of the Rev. Alban Butler, and Now Placed in Order, with a Prefixed Callender; to which is Added, an Office and Litany in Their Honour, with a Defence of the Monastic Institute. By a Cistercian Monk, J. Coyne This article incorporates text from this source, which is in the public domain.
- O'Hanlon, John (1873), Lives of the Irish saints This article incorporates text from this source, which is in the public domain.
- Ram, Pierre François Xavier de (1848), Vies des pères, martyrs et autres principaux saints d'Alban Butler (in French), Vanderborght This article incorporates text from this source, which is in the public domain.
- "Saint Frédégand of Kerkelodor", CatholicSaints.info
- St. Augustine's Abbey, Ramsgate (1921), The Book of saints : a dictionary of servants of God canonized by the Catholic Church, London: A. & C. Black, ltd. This article incorporates text from this source, which is in the public domain.
