= Filiatra =

Town in Messenia, Greece

Filiatra Φιλιατρά
- Municipal unit
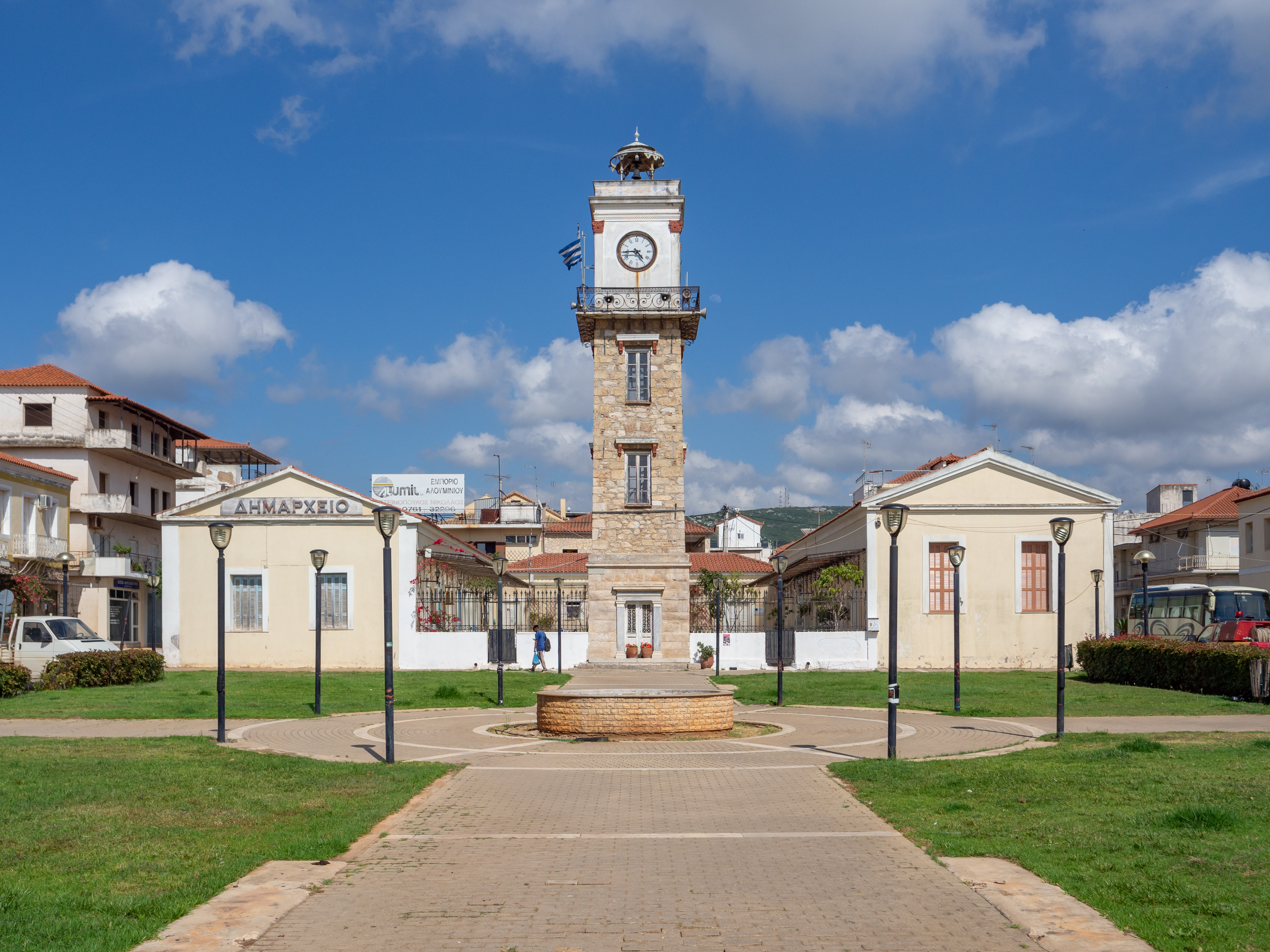
- The clock tower of Filiatra with the Town Hall in the background

- Location within the regional unit

- Location within Greece
- Coordinates: 37°9′N 21°35′E
- Country: Greece
- Administrative region: Peloponnese
- Regional unit: Messenia
- Municipality: Trifylia

Area
  - Municipal unit: 114.9 km^{2} (44.4 sq mi)
- Elevation: 66 m (217 ft)

Population (2021)
  - Municipal unit: 5,359
  - Municipal unit density: 46.64/km^{2} (120.8/sq mi)
  - Community: 4,729
- Time zone: UTC+2 (EET)
  - Summer (DST): UTC+3 (EEST)
- Postal code: 243 00
- Area code: 27610
- Vehicle registration: ΚΜ
- Website: filiatra.gr

Filiatra (Greek: Φιλιατρά), is a town and a former municipality in Messenia, Peloponnese, Greece. Since the 2011 local government reform it is part of the municipality Trifylia, of which it is a municipal unit. The municipal unit has an area of 114.877 km^{2}.

Filiatra is situated near the Ionian Sea coast in western Messenia. It is located 11 km northwest of Gargalianoi, 13 km southwest of Kyparissia, 29 km northwest of Pylos and 49 km west of Kalamata. The Greek National Road 9 (Patras - Pyrgos - Kyparissia - Pylos) passes through the town. Filiatra was founded around the 12th and the 13th centuries. It was constructed close to the site of the ancient city Erana. Filiatra has several schools, churches and shops. A scaled reproduction of the Eiffel Tower stands at the entrance to the village. The local soccer club is Erani Filiatra.

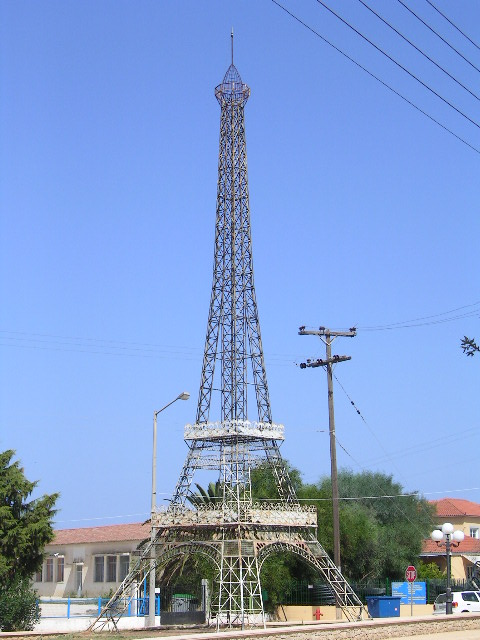
A replica of Eiffel tower

== Subdivisions ==
The municipal unit Filiatra is subdivided into the following communities (2021 population in brackets):

- Chalazoni (120)
- Christianoupolis (244)
- Exochiko (167)
- Filiatra
- Mali (46)
- Plati (53)

The community Filiatra consists of the following settlements, besides the Filiatra town proper:

- Agia Kyriaki
- Agrilos
- Kountri
- Lagkouvardos - a beach area located near Agia Kyriaki
- Lempestena
- Limenari, the access from Filiatra to the sea. It is around 2 km from the town centre
- Merolithi
- Stomio
- Vryses

== Historical population ==
Year	Town	Community	Municipal unit
1981	5,139	-	-
1991	6,062	7,753	-
2001	6,719	7,882	9,334
2011	5,969	6,791	7,514
2021	4,373	4,729	5,359

== Notable people ==
- The Liberopoulos brothers:
  - Nikos Liberopoulos, footballer
  - Sotiris Liberopoulos, footballer
- Nikolaos Frousos, footballer
- Theodoros Marangos, film director
- Kanaris Tsinganos, theoretical astrophysicist and professor

== See also ==
- List of settlements in Messenia
