= Erana (Cilicia) =

Erana was a town of ancient Cilicia. Cicero, after leaving Epiphaneia, ascended the Amanus, and he took Erana, a place not of the character of a village, but of a city, and the capital of the nation. He also took Sepyra and Commoris. The sites of these places are unknown, but they were in eastern Cilicia, on some part of Mount Amanus.
