= Erana (Messenia) =

Coordinates: 37°07′11″N 21°34′35″E

Erana (Ancient Greek: ἡ Ἔρανα) was a town in ancient Messenia, Greece, mentioned by Strabo as lying upon the road between Cyparissia and Pylus. According to Strabo, it was erroneously identified by some with the Homeric Arene.

It was located near the present town Filiatra, in an area that is now known as Agia Kyriaki. More archeologically interesting sites have been found around Filiatra. A stone axe from the Neolithic era has been found at Gournospilies. In Armakadia, on the road from Filiatra to Gargalianoi, traces of a Mycenean settlement have been found, including a Mycenean tomb.
