= Palgrave's Golden Treasury =

1861 anthology of English poetry

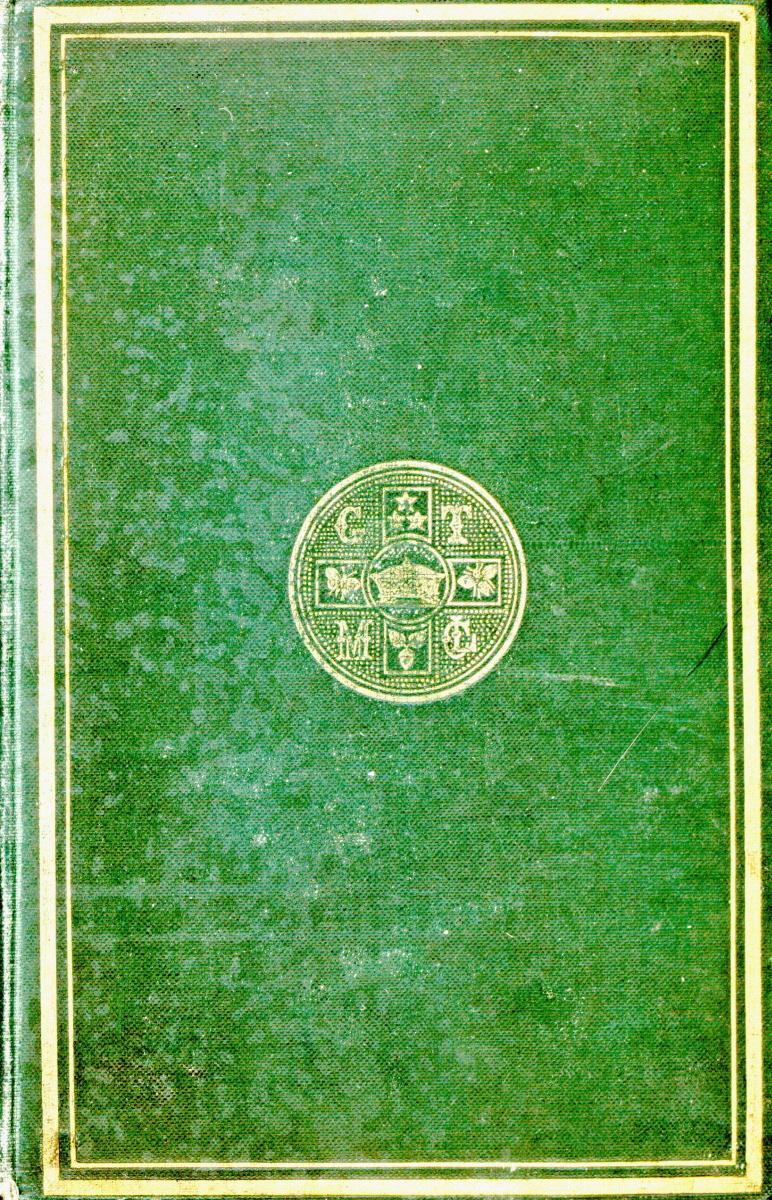
Gilt bordered boards of the 1861 first edition of Palgrave's Golden Treasury

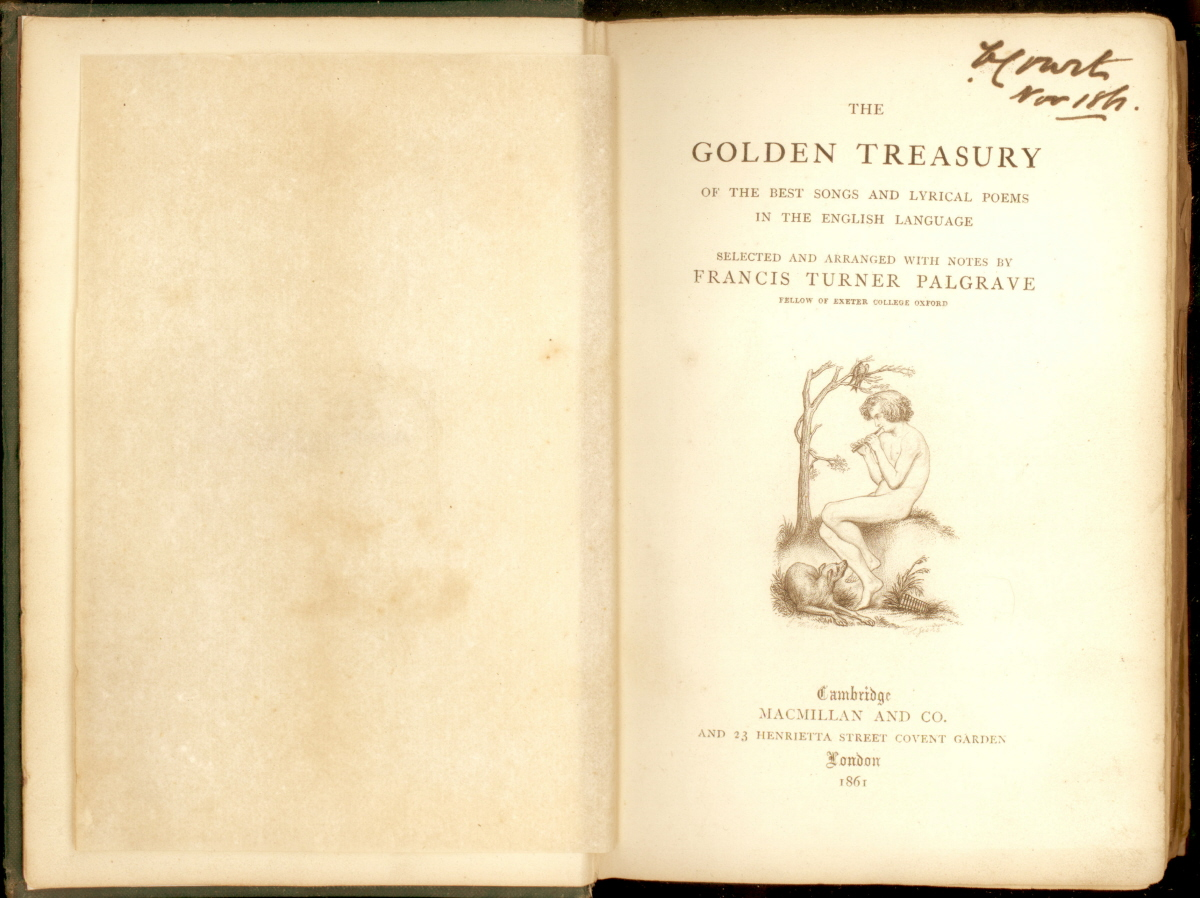
Title page of the 1861 first edition. Frontispiece by Thomas Woolner

The Golden Treasury of English Songs and Lyrics is a popular anthology of English poetry, originally selected for publication by Francis Turner Palgrave in 1861. It was considerably revised, with input from Alfred, Lord Tennyson, about three decades later. Palgrave excluded all poems by poets then still alive.

The book continues to be published in regular new editions; still under Palgrave's name. These reproduce Palgrave's selections and notes, but usually include a supplement of more recent poems. Christopher Ricks in 1991 produced a scholarly edition of the original Treasury, along with an account of its evolution from 1861 to 1891, with inclusions and exclusions.

== Book I (Palgrave) ==
William Alexander, 1st Earl of Stirling – Richard Barnefield – Thomas Campion – Samuel Daniel – Thomas Dekker – Edward de Vere, 17th Earl of Oxford – Robert Devereux, 2nd Earl of Essex – John Donne – Michael Drayton – William Drummond – Thomas Heywood – Thomas Lodge – John Lylye – Christopher Marlowe – Thomas Nashe – William Shakespeare – Sir Philip Sidney – Edmund Spenser – The Shepherd Tonie – Joshua Sylvester – John Webster – Sir Thomas Wyatt

== Book II (Palgrave) ==
Francis Beaumont – Thomas Carew – Abraham Cowley – Richard Crashaw – John Dryden – John Fletcher – William Habington – George Herbert – Robert Herrick – Ben Jonson – Richard Lovelace – Andrew Marvell – John Milton – John Norris of Bemerton – Francis Quarles – Sir Charles Sedley – John Shirley – Sir John Suckling – Henry Vaughan – Edmund Waller – John Wilmot, Earl of Rochester – George Wither – Sir Henry Wotton

== Book III (Palgrave) ==
Anna Laetitia Barbauld – William Blake – Robert Burns – Henry Carey – Colley Cibber – John Collins – William Collins – William Cowper – Jane Elliott – John Gay – Oliver Goldsmith – Robert Graham of Gartmore – Thomas Gray – Lady A. Lindsay – Joshua Logan – W. J. Mickle – Lady Nairn – Ambrose Philips – Alexander Pope – Matthew Prior – Samuel Rogers – Christopher Smart – James Thomson

== Book IV (Palgrave) ==
Poems from William Wordsworth's Lucy series. The two titles have been added by Palgrave (see last image below).

More of Wordsworth's Lucy poems.

Left: page 188 of the Golden Treasury showing Keats's poem with title added by Palgrave; right: page 321 containing footnotes, the first of which acknowledges Palgrave's addition(s).

William Blake – Lord Byron – Thomas Campbell – Hartley Coleridge – Samuel Taylor Coleridge – Allan Cunningham – Thomas Hood – John Keats – Charles Lamb – Mary Lamb – H. F. Lyte – Thomas Moore – Percy Bysshe Shelley – Sir Walter Scott – Robert Southey – Charles Wolfe – William Wordsworth

== Book V as selected by Laurence Binyon ==
This five-book version is republished as a Penguin Popular Classic

Matthew Arnold – William Barnes – F. W. Bourdillon – Robert Bridges – Emily Brontë – Rupert Brooke – Elizabeth Barrett Browning – Robert Browning – John Clare – Arthur Hugh Clough – Mary Coleridge – William Johnson Cory – John Davidson – Austin Dobson – D. M. Dolben – George Darley – R. W. Dixon – Edward FitzGerald – James Elroy Flecker – Thomas Hardy – Thomas Hood – Gerard Manley Hopkins – Lionel Johnson – Charles Kingsley – Rudyard Kipling – Walter Savage Landor – Hon. Emily Lawless – J. C. Mangan – John Masefield – George Meredith – William Morris – Sir Henry Newbolt – Alice Meynell – William Morris – Wilfred Owen – Coventry Patmore – Christina Georgina Rossetti – Dante Gabriel Rossetti – Charles Sorley – Robert Louis Stevenson – Algernon Charles Swinburne – Alfred, Lord Tennyson – Edward Thomas – Francis Thompson – H. F. Trench – William Butler Yeats

== Additional Poems, as selected by C. Day-Lewis (1954, Collins) ==
An important edition was edited by Cecil Day-Lewis, later Poet laureate. It contained 229 Additional Poems, with Books I-IV, including in this case a number of American poets.

William Blake – Walter Savage Landor – T. L. Peacock – John Clare – W. C. Bryant – George Darley – William Barnes – Thomas Lovell Beddoes – Ralph Waldo Emerson – Elizabeth Barrett Browning – H. W. Longfellow – Edward Fitzgerald – Edgar Allan Poe – Alfred Tennyson – Robert Browning – Aubrey de Vere – Emily Brontë – A. H. Clough – Charles Kingsley – Herman Melville – Walt Whitman – Jean Ingelow – Matthew Arnold – William Cory – Coventry Patmore – William Allingham – Sydney Dobell – George Meredith – D. G. Rossetti – Emily Dickinson – Christina Rossetti – Richard Watson Dixon – William Morris – Warren de Tabley – Algernon Charles Swinburne – Thomas Hardy – Robert Bridges – Gerard Manley Hopkins – Andrew Lang – A. W. E. O’Shaughnessy – R. L. Stevenson – John Davidson – A. E. Housman – Francis Thompson – Mary E. Coleridge – Rudyard Kipling – W. B. Yeats – Ernest Dowson – Lionel Johnson – Laurence Binyon – Edwin Arlington Robinson – Hilaire Belloc – T. Sturge Moore – W. H. Davies – Ralph Hodgson – Walter de la Mare – G. K. Chesterton – Robert Frost – John Masefield – Edward Thomas – Harold Monro – Padraic Colum – James Stephens – James Elroy Flecker – D. H. Lawrence – Ezra Pound – Andrew Young – Siegfried Sassoon – Rupert Brooke – Edwin Muir – Edith Sitwell – T. S. Eliot – John Crowe Ransom – W. J. Turner – Dorothy Wellesley – V. Sackville-West – Wilfred Owen – Lilian Bowes Lyon – Robert Graves – Edmund Blunden – F. R. Higgins – William Soutar – Roy Campbell – C. Day-Lewis – John Betjeman – W. H. Auden – Louis MacNeice – Stephen Spender – George Barker – Laurie Lee – Henry Reed – Dylan Thomas – Alun Lewis – David Gascoyne – Sidney Keyes

== OUP Edition (1994) in six books ==
Edited by John Press. The poets included were:

Dannie Abse – Fleur Adcock – William Alexander, Earl of Stirling – Kingsley Amis – Simon Armitage – Matthew Arnold – W. H. Auden – Francis Bacon, Lord Verulam – Anna Laetitia Barbauld – George Barker – Richard Barnfield – Francis Beaumont – Patricia Beer – John Betjeman – Laurence Binyon – Thomas Blackburn – Edmund Blunden – Eavan Boland – Ronald Bottrall – Robert Bridges – George Mackay Brown – Elizabeth Barrett Browning – Robert Browning – Alan Brownjohn – Robert Burns – George Gordon Noel, Lord Byron – Norman Cameron – Roy Campbell – Thomas Campbell – Thomas Campion – Thomas Carew – Henry Carey – Lewis Carroll – Charles Causley – Colley Cibber – John Clare – Austin Clarke – Jack Clemo – Arthur Hugh Clough – Hartley Coleridge – Samuel Taylor Coleridge – John Collins – William Collins – Tony Connor – Henry Constable – David Constantine – Abraham Cowley – William Cowper – Richard Crashaw – Robert Crawford – Allan Cunningham – Samuel Daniel – George Darley – Donald Davie – W. H. Davies – Dick Davis – Thomas Dekker – Walter de la Mare – Lord De Tabley – Richard Watson Dixon – Keith Douglas – Ernest Dowson – Michael Drayton – William Drummond – John Dryden – Carol Ann Duffy – Helen Dunmore – Douglas Dunn – Lawrence Durrell – Thomas Stearns Eliot – Alistair Elliot – Jean Elliot – William Empson – D. J. Enright – Gavin Ewart – James Fenton – Roy Fisher – Edward FitzGerald – John Fletcher – Veronica Forrest-Thomson – John Fuller – Roy Fuller – Elizabeth Garrett – David Gascoyne – John Gay – Oliver Goldsmith – Robert Graham – Robert Graves – Thomas Gray – Thom Gunn – Michael Hamburger – Ian Hamilton – Thomas Hardy – Tony Harrison – Seamus Heaney – John Heath-Stubbs – George Herbert – Robert Herrick – Thomas Heywood – Geoffrey Hill – Ralph Hodgson – David Holbrook – Molly Holden – Thomas Hood – Gerard Manley Hopkins – A. E. Housman – Ted Hughes – T. E. Hulme – Elizabeth Jennings – Lionel Johnson – Ben Jonson – Patrick Kavanagh – John Keats – Sidney Keyes – Thomas Kinsella – Rudyard Kipling – James Kirkup – Charles Lamb – Walter Savage Landor – Philip Larkin – D. H. Lawrence – Edward Lear – Laurie Lee – Alun Lewis – Cecil Day-Lewis – Lady Anne Lindsay – Thomas Lodge – John Logan – Michael Longley – Richard Lovelace – Edward Lowbury – John Lyly – George MacBeth – Norman MacCaig – Hugh MacDiarmid – Louis MacNeice – Derek Mahon – Christopher Marlowe – Andrew Marvell – John Masefield – George Meredith – William Julius Mickle – John Milton – Thomas Moore – William Morris – Andrew Motion – Edwin Muir – Paul Muldoon – Carolina, Lady Nairne – Thomas Nash – Robert Nichols – Norman Nicholson – Bernard O'Donoghue – Wilfred Owen – Coventry Patmore – Tom Paulin – Ambrose Philips – Alexander Pope – Peter Porter – Jonathan Price – F. T. Prince – Matthew Prior – Craig Raine – Peter Redgrove – Henry Reed – Anne Ridler – Michael Riviere – W. R. Rodgers – Samuel Rogers – Isaac Rosenberg – Alan Ross – Christina Georgina Rossetti – Dante Gabriel Rossetti – Carol Rumens – Lawrence Sail – Siegfried Sassoon – Vernon Scannell – Sir Walter Scott – Peter Scupham – Sir Charles Sedley – George Sewell – William Shakespeare – Percy Bysshe Shelley – James Shirley – Sir Philip Sidney – Jon Silkin – C. H. Sisson – Edith Sitwell – Iain Crichton Smith – Stevie Smith – Robert Southey – Bernard Spencer – Stephen Spender – Edmund Spenser – Jon Stallworthy – Anne Stevenson – Sir John Suckling – Algernon Charles Swinburne – Joshua Sylvester – Alfred, Lord Tennyson – Dylan Thomas – Edward Thomas – R. S. Thomas – Francis Thompson – James Thomson (The Seasons) – James Thomson (B.V.) – Anthony Thwaite – Terence Tiller – Charles Tomlinson – The Shepherd Tony – Henry Vaughan – Edward Vere, Earl of Oxford – John Wain – Ted Walker – Edmund Waller – Vernon Watkins – John Webster – Robert Wells – Lawrence Whistler – Hugo Williams – George Wither – Charles Wolfe – William Wordsworth – Sir Henry Wotton – David Wright – Kit Wright – Sir Thomas Wyat – William Butler Yeats – Andrew Young

== Editions online ==
- The Golden Treasury at Project Gutenberg
- Online text at Bartleby.com (1875)
- Scanned books at Google Books: 1861, 1894, 1903, 1905, 1906, 1911, 1911, 1916, 1921, 1922
- The Golden Treasury public domain audiobook at LibriVox (1861 edition)
