= Heinemann Award =

The W. H. Heinemann Award is an award established by William Heinemann who bequeathed funds to the Royal Society of Literature to establish a literary prize, given from 1945 to 2003.

== Awards list ==
- 1945 A Prospect of Flowers, botanical reminiscences by Andrew Young, poet and vicar of Stonegate in Sussex
- 1946 The Garden by Vita Sackville-West
- 1947 Letters to Malaya by Martyn Skinner
- 1948 Selected Poems by John Betjeman
- 1951 Gormenghast and The Glassblowers by Mervyn Peake
- 1952 The Cruel Sea by Nicholas Monsarrat
- 1953 Edwin Muir
- 1954 The Ermine: poems, 1942–1952 by Ruth Pitter (joint winner)
- 1954 The Go-Between by L.P. Hartley (joint winner)
- 1955 Song at the Year's Turning by R. S. Thomas
- 1956 Roman Mornings by James Lees-Milne
- 1957 A Reed Shaken by the Wind by Gavin Maxwell
- 1958 The Chequer'd Shade by John Press
- 1959 The Devil's Advocate by Morris West
- 1960 Venice by Jan Morris
- 1961 The Masks of Love by Vernon Scannell
- 1962 Curmantle by Christopher Fry
- 1962 The Destruction of Lord Raglan by Christopher Hibbert
- 1963 Mrs. Browning: A Poet's Work and Its Setting by Alethea Hayter
- 1964 The Marsh Arabs by Wilfred Thesiger
- 1965 Journey from Obscurity: Wilfred Owen, 1893-1919 by Harold Owen
- 1966 Wide Sargasso Sea by Jean Rhys
- 1967 Charlotte Bronte: The Evolution of Genius by Winifred Gérin
- 1968 George Eliot: A Biography by Gordon S. Haight
- 1969 Sir William Hamilton: Envoy Extraordinary by Brian Fothergill
- 1969 V. S. Pritchett
- 1970 Britain and Her Army by Corelli Barnett
- 1971 Granite Island: Portrait of Corsica by Dorothy Carrington
- 1972 Mercian Hymns by Geoffrey Hill
- 1973 The Chant of Jimmie Blacksmith by Thomas Keneally
- 1974 Mooncranker's Gift by Barry Unsworth
- 1974 Eclipse by Nicholas Wollaston
- 1975 William Wilberforce by Robin Furneaux
- 1976 Angels at the Ritz by William Trevor
- 1978 The First Fabians by Norman Ian MacKenzie and Jeanne MacKenzie
- 1979 Live Bait and Other Stories by Frank Tuohy
- 1979 Beckford of Fonthill by Brian Fothergill
- 1980 Moortown by Ted Hughes
- 1981 Old Glory: An American Voyage by Jonathan Raban
- 1983 Fortunate Traveller by Derek Walcott
- 1984 T.S. Eliot: A Life by Peter Ackroyd (joint winner)
- 1984 Eleni by Nicholas Gage (joint winner)
- 1985 Secrets of a Woman's Heart: Later Life of Ivy Compton-Burnett, 1920–69 by Hilary Spurling
- 1986 The Blind Watchmaker by Richard Dawkins
- 1988 The Russian Album by Michael Ignatieff
- 1989 Elizabeth Barrett Browning: A Biography by Margaret Forster
- 1990 Short Afternoons by Kit Wright
- 1991 Ford Maddox Ford by Alan Judd
- 1994 The Handless Maiden by Vicki Feaver
- 1995 Younghusband: The Last Great Imperial Adventurer by Patrick French (joint winner)
- 1995 Paul Durcan (joint winner)
- 1996 The Shadow of Hiroshima and Other Film/Poems by Tony Harrison
- 1997 Victor Hugo by Graham Robb
- 1998 Coleridge: Darker Reflections, 1804–1834 by Richard Holmes
- 2001 Night of Stone: Death and Memory in Twentieth-Century Russia by Catherine Merridale
- 2002 Charles Darwin: The Power of Place by Janet Browne
- 2003 Primo Levi by Ian Thomson
- 2004 Power and Glory by Adam Nicolson
