= Hugh Woolner =

British stockbroker and businessman; RMS Titanic survivor

- Born: 28 September 1866; Marylebone, London, England
- Died: 13 February 1925 (aged 58); Budapest, Hungary
- Education: Marlborough College; University of Cambridge
- Occupations: Stockbroker; Businessman
- Spouses: Mary Simpson (m. 1892; died 1906) Mary Aglaia Ionides (m. 1912)
- Children: 7
- Father: Thomas Woolner
- Relatives: Laurence Irving (son-in-law); Malcolm Erskine, 17th Earl of Buchan (grandson)

Hugh Woolner (28 September 1866 – 13 February 1925) was a British stockbroker who survived the sinking of the Titanic by jumping into Collapsible Boat D as it was lower, along with fellow passenger Mauritz Björnström-Steffansson. Woolner was a principal of a London stockbroking firm, Woolner and Company until his company went bankrupt after a poor investment.

== Early life and family ==
He was the second son and child (out of six) of renowned sculptor, Thomas Woolner and his wife Alice Gertrude (née Waugh) Amongst Thomas' notable works is the statue of James Cook, in Hyde Park, Sydney.

Woolner attended Marlborough College and the University of Cambridge. He married Mary Simpson, a native of Yorkshire, and had six children. Mary Woolner died in 1906 after the birth of their youngest child, Christina who was, soon after, given up for adoption. He remarried in August 1912 to Mary Aglaia Dowson (née Ionides), a divorcee. The couple had one child, a son.

His daughter Rosalind was married to Laurence Irving, set designer and grandson of actor Henry Irving. Another daughter, Christina, married Donald Erskine, 16th Earl of Buchan.

In 1892, Woolner became a stockbroker at the London Stock Exchange and later began his own company Woolner and Co. in which he was the principle owner.

== Great Cobar mine and bankruptcy ==
By the late 1900s, Woolner's company was in trouble due to "incurred heavy losses through the default of clients, falling markets and the stagnation of business due to the South African war". By the end of 1904, the firm was insolvent but continued to trade illegally. By promoting a company, called Bohemian Mining Corporation Limited, Woolner and Company returned to solvency. Woolner and Co sold into its float Schoenfeld-Schlaggenwald Zinn und Wolfram Zechen Gewerkschaft, a tin and wolfram/tungsten mine near Karlovy Vary. A director of Bohemian Mining Corporation—ultimately an unsuccessful investment for its shareholders—was Andrew Haes, later the Chairman of Great Cobar.

Woolner acted as the buyer when the Great Cobar assets were purchased in May 1906, before selling them into the float of Great Cobar Limited six days later. The deal was complex but ended up being unprofitable for Wollner, personally. It came to light that Woolner was the nominal buyer, merely acting for others, particularly George Earle Baker, one of the vendors, who had been a mining agent in Western Australia, and Andrew Haes. Haes, later the chairman of Great Cobar Limited, had advanced the costs for arranging the float to the apparently cash strapped Woolner. Andrew Haes, it was later revealed, had been a director of some failed or unprofitable listed companies.

It was a later involvement in the trading of Great Cobar shares that ultimately would be Woolner's undoing as a stockbroker. In April 1907, he accepted orders from a 'Mr Nassif', ostensibly a principal of the New York firm Montmorency & Co., to purchase two parcels of Great Cobar shares, totalling 110,000 shares. 'Mr Nassif' never paid for the shares, and during several months while awaiting payment, the price of Great Cobar shares fell. Woolner and Co. went broke as a result of the uncompleted transaction. Some suspected that the whole exercise had been a 'ramping' attempt to raise the price of Great Cobar shares, which had gone awry when the price actually fell instead of rising.

In 1908, Woolner took legal action and won a case against George Earle Baker — another promoter of Great Cobar Limited — and obtained a judgement for £7,000. However, the judgement was reversed and made against Woolner & Co., for £11,702. Woolner and his partner Sumner-Jones were declared in default and ‘hammered’, meaning they could no longer trade on the London Stock Exchange. Bankrupt and publicly humiliated, Woolner attempted to re-establish his career in America, spending some of his time there. His personal bankruptcy was discharged in 1910.

The judgement against Woolner had been a pyrrhic victory for George Earle Baker. The £18,598 in assets he recovered from Woolner's bankrupt estate were later sold for only £200; that, along with a large loss on his own shareholding in Great Cobar, led to Baker's bankruptcy. He would still be an undischarged bankrupt in March 1920.

== RMS Titanic ==
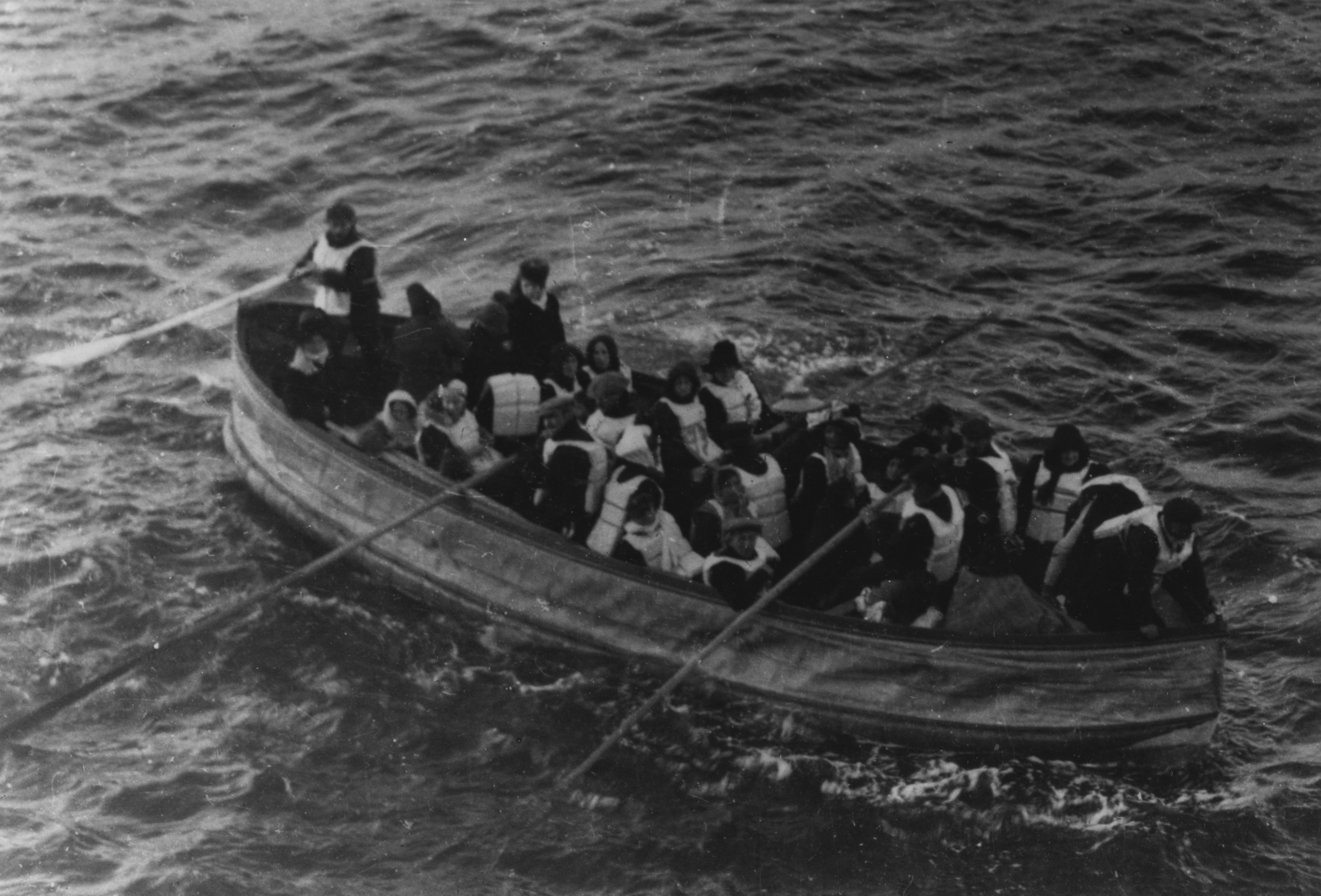
Collapsible Boat D photograph from RMS Carpathia. Woolner (far right) can be seen at the bow of the boat.

Woolner travelled aboard RMS Titanic during its maiden and only voyage. He had returned to London attend the funeral of his mother and was returning to the United States. During the voyage, he became acquainted with Mauritz Björnström-Steffansson, a Swedish businessman. At the behest of a friend, he also looked after Helen Churchill Candee whom he met in Cherbourg.

Woolner later testified at the U.S. Senate inquiry into the disaster. Recounting to Senator William Alden Smith, he and Steffansson were in the first class smoking room at the moment of impact with the iceberg. Woolner went to retrieve Churchill Candee and saw her into Lifeboat No. 6. The two men went on deck and began helping crew members fill the lifeboats with women and children, in what they initially believed was a precautionary exercise. Woolner attempted to convince Ida and Isidor Straus to take a boat but both refused.

Once the seriousness of the situation was understood, Woolner and Steffansson helped the crew physically remove a number of men who had forced their way into lifeboat C, ahead of women and children. He confirmed that when most the lifeboats were launched, moments before the ship finally went under, he and Steffansson took the opportunity to jump from the rails of the flooding A deck into an empty space at the bow of collapsible lifeboat D, the last lifeboat to leave the ship. Woolner and Steffansson pulled another man from the water, likely Frederick M. Hoyt, and together, they helped to row the lifeboat away from the ship. The boat was otherwise mainly filled by women and children. The boat tied up together with five others in a flotilla under the command of Fifth Officer Harold Lowe.

After a while, Lifeboat No. 14, under Lowe's command, left to return to the wrecksite and, after RMS Carpathia was spotted, the flotilla disbanded to row to the rescue ship. Boat D, with its lack of seaman, struggled against the waves. No. 14, returning from the wrecksite, spotted the boat, with Lowe noting it looked "rather sorry". According Woolner, Lowe called out, "How are you?" to which Woolner replied, "We have about all we want." Lowe took Boat D into tow and, after rescuing the survivors from the damaged and swamped Boat A, they reached Carpathia around 7:00 AM.

== Later life and death ==
Woolner was accused of exerting undue influence on the 1912 and 1913 wills of Elizabeth Josephine Forster. She was a wealthy nonagenarian and patron of artists, whose property was worth more than £500,000. Forster's relatives took the matter to the Admiralty, Divorce and Probate Division of the High Court in London. They alleged that the will was not duly executed, that Elizabeth Foster was not of sound mind, and that she had not understood the will. They argued that her property had to be protected by the Commissioners in Lunacy. The case was settled in March 1917.

Woolner and his wife began splitting time between London and Budapest, Hungary. He was in Budapest when he fell ill died at the age of 58 on 13 February 1925. His widow never remarried and died in London in 1945.
