= John Press =

John Bryant Press (11 January 1920 – 26 February 2007) was a poet, anthologist and critic who worked for the British Council for much of his life.

== Life ==
The only child of Edward Press, who worked at Colman's in Norwich, John Press was born there and attended Norwich School; he then went on to Corpus Christi College, Cambridge, where he read history from 1938 to 1940. After war service in the Royal Artillery, he returned to Cambridge to complete his degree and then joined the British Council, in whose service he remained for 33 years. During that time he was posted in Greece (1946–50), India and Ceylon (1950–52), Birmingham (1952–54), Cambridge (1954–62), London (1962–5), Paris (1966–71) and Oxford (1971–8). In 1959 Press was elected a Fellow of the Royal Society of Literature and served on its council from 1961 to 1988.

While working for the British Council, Press was responsible for writing short surveys of the work of the poets Andrew Marvell (1958), Robert Herrick (1961), Louis MacNeice (1965), John Betjeman (1974) and the Poets of World War 1 (1983). These were supplemented by some of his more substantial critical works, such as Rule and Energy: trends in British Poetry since the Second World War (OUP, 1963), and A Map of Modern English Verse (OUP 1969), the latter containing 14 sections devoted to a poet or group of poets, concentrating on what they said of their work rather than academic analysis. The former work was based on the George Ellison Poetry Foundation lectures that Press gave at the University of Cincinnati in 1962. Included in its survey was one of the earliest appraisals of Movement poetry, identifying its "neutral tone" and setting it in its historical context.

All of Press' critical works appeared from Oxford University Press, including several dealing with more general subjects. The Fire and the Fountain: an essay on poetry (1955) traced the way that a poem grows and is shaped in the mind. According to Lawrence Sail in his obituary, the book established Press' ability to marshal opposing forces on either side of an argument in a way characteristic of his work to come. It was followed by The Chequer'd Shade: reflections on obscurity in poetry (1958), a "thorough and conscientious survey" of the causes of its perception over the centuries, for which he won the 1958 Heinemann Award. But his final study, The Lengthening Shadows: observations on poetry and its enemies (1971), was found trite and over-pessimistic by The Review of English Studies.

He died in Frome in 2007.

== Poetry ==
In the eyes of some of his colleagues, Press' updating of the venerable Palgrave's Golden Treasury has been considered significant. He edited a Book V in 1964, supplementing it with a Book VI in 1994 and adding such writers as Dylan Thomas, George Mackay Brown, Ted Hughes, Philip Larkin, Carol Ann Duffy and Simon Armitage, "well-nigh submerging Palgrave's originally chosen seventy-five poets among 231". However, a reviewer for The Irish Times found the choice "so inbred and uninspiring that you almost wish the original had been left to stand alone as a mid-Victorian period piece".

Two books of Press' own poetry also appeared from the Oxford University Press: Uncertainties (1957) and Guy Fawkes Night and other poems (1959). Thereafter his poems appeared mostly in small press collections, which included the small 2004 selection of his work from the Greville Press. A long-standing friendship with Edward Lowbury (who published some of Press' early poems in the wartime magazine Equator when they both met on war service in Kenya) eventually resulted in Troika, a volume that Press shared with Lowbury and Michael Riviere (Daedalus Press, 1977). Later he published a handful of poems in Physic Meet and Metaphysic, the 1993 celebration for Lowbury's 80th birthday. The poem "A Prospect of Heaven" from this conveys an idea of his undemanding style and impish humour:

Though I love music, I have no desire
To hear the chanting of the heavenly choir,
For even Handel's Hallelujah Chorus,
Prolonged throughout eternity, would bore us.
Nor do I yearn to savour the delight
Of casting down my crown while robed in white.
Since Hell, they say, is infinitely seedier,
I'll choose, like Anglicans, the via media:
Reserve for me a shady spot in Limbo,
Furnished with good books, champagne and a bimbo.
