= Christopher Hibbert =

English author, historian and Army Officer (1924–2008)

Christopher Hibbert MC FRSL FRGS
- Hibbert c. 1958
- Born: Arthur Raymond Hibbert; 5 March 1924; Enderby, Leicestershire, England
- Died: 21 December 2008 (aged 84); Henley-on-Thames, Oxfordshire, England

Academic background
- Education: Oriel College, Oxford

Academic work
- Main interests: British history
- Notable works: Various major biographies

Arthur Raymond Hibbert (5 March 1924 – 21 December 2008), known as Christopher Hibbert, was an English author, popular historian and biographer. He has been called "a pearl of biographers" (New Statesman) and "probably the most widely read popular historian of our time and undoubtedly one of the most prolific" (The Times).

== Biography ==
Arthur Raymond Hibbert was born in Enderby, Leicestershire in 1924, the son of Canon H. V. Hibbert (died 1980) and his wife Maude. He was the second of three children, and christened Arthur Raymond. He was educated at Radley College, a public school for boys near Abingdon-on-Thames, in Oxfordshire, before he went up to Oriel College at the University of Oxford. He was awarded the degrees of BA and later MA.

He left Oriel College to join the Army, where a sergeant major referred to Hibbert as "Christopher Robin" (of Winnie the Pooh books) based upon his youthful looks. The name "Christopher" subsequently stuck. During World War II, Hibbert served as an infantry officer in the London Irish Rifles regiment in Italy, reaching the rank of captain. He was wounded twice and awarded the Military Cross in 1945.

From 1945 to 1959, he was a partner in a firm of land agents and auctioneers, and began his writing career in 1957. Hibbert was awarded the Heinemann Award for Literature in 1962 for The Destruction of Lord Raglan. He was a Fellow of the Royal Society of Literature.

== Personal life ==
Hibbert lived at Henley-on-Thames, Oxfordshire, and was a member of the Army and Navy Club and the Garrick Club. He was married to Susan Piggford and the couple had three children: his literary executor Kate Hibbert, television writer Jimmy Hibbert and music journalist Tom Hibbert.

He died on 21 December 2008, in Henley, from bronchial pneumonia at the age of 84. He was cremated, after a humanist ceremony in Oxford, on 2 January 2009.

== Works ==
- The Road to Tyburn: The Story of Jack Sheppard and the Eighteenth Century Underworld (Longmans, 1957)
- King Mob: The Story of Lord George Gordon and the Riots of 1780 (Longmans, 1958)
- Wolfe at Quebec (Longmans, 1959)
- Corunna (B. T. Batsford, 1961) ISBN 113571309X
- The Destruction of Lord Raglan (Longmans, 1961)
- Benito Mussolini. A Biography (Longmans, 1962) reprinted as Mussolini: The Rise and Fall of Il Duce (St Martin's Griffin, 2008; Foreword by Tobias Jones)
- The Battle of Arnhem (B. T. Batsford, 1962)
- The Roots of Evil: A Social History of Crime and Punishment (Weidenfeld & Nicolson, 1963)
- Agincourt (B. T. Batsford, 1964)
- The Wheatley Diary: A Journal and Sketch-book kept during the Peninsular War and the Waterloo Campaign (Longmans, 1964) editor
- The Court at Windsor. A Domestic History (Longmans, 1964) later revised
- Garibaldi and His Enemies (Longmans, 1965)
- The Making of Charles Dickens (HarperCollins, 1967)
- Waterloo: Napoleon's Last Campaign (New English Library, 1967) ISBN 978-1853266874
- Highwaymen (Weidenfeld and Nicolson, 1967) "Pageant of History" series
- Charles I (Weidenfeld and Nicolson, 1968)
- An American in Regency England: The Journal of a Tour in 1810-1811; by Louis Simond (Robert Maxwell, 1968) editor
- London: The Biography of a City (Longmans, Green & Co., 1969)
- The Grand Tour (Weidenfeld and Nicolson, 1969)
- The Search for King Arthur (Cassell, 1969) reprinted as King Arthur (Tempus, 2007)
- The Dragon Wakes: China and the West, 1793-1911 (Longmans, 1970)
- Recollections of Rifleman Harris (Leo Cooper, 1970) editor ISBN 085052-005-3
- The Personal History of Samuel Johnson (Longmans, 1971)
- Tower of London (Newsweek, 1971) ISBN 978-0882250021 "Wonders of Man" series
- Edward: The Uncrowned King (Macdonald, 1972)
- Versailles (Newsweek, 1972) "Wonders of Man" series
- George IV. Prince of Wales, 1762-1811 Vol 1: (Longman, 1972)
- George IV. Regent and King, 1811-1830 Vol 2: (Allen Lane, 1974)
- The Rise and Fall of the House of Medici (Allen Lane, 1974) reprinted by the Folio Society, 1998
- A Soldier of the Seventy-First: The Journal of a Soldier in the Peninsular War (Leo Cooper, 1975) editor
- The Illustrated London News: Social History of Victorian Britain (Angus and Robertson, 1975)
- Edward VII: A Portrait (Allen Lane, 1976)
- Memoirs of the Public and Private Life of Queen Caroline; by Joseph Nightingale (Folio Society, 1978) editor
- Disraeli and his World (Thames and Hudson, 1978) ISBN 0-500-13065-5
- The Great Mutiny: India, 1857 (Allen Lane, 1978), as Penguin Pocketbook: 1980, ISBN 978-0-14-004752-3.
- The Court of St James's: The Monarch at Work from Victoria to Elizabeth II (Weidenfeld and Nicolson, 1979) ISBN 0-29777631-2
- The French Revolution (Penguin, 1980) ISBN 978-0-14004945-9.
- Greville's England: Selections from the Diaries of Charles Greville 1818-1860 (Folio Society, 1981) editor
- Africa Explored: Europeans in the Dark Continent, 1769-1889 (Allen Lane, 1982)
- Chateaux of the Loire (Newsweek, 1983) "Wonders of Man" series
- The London Encyclopaedia with Ben Weinreb (Macmillan, 1983) later revised, with Julia and John Keay (3rd ed. 2010)
- Rome: The Biography of a City (Viking, 1985) ISBN 0393019845
- Cities and Civilisations (Weidenfeld and Nicolson, 1986) ISBN 0-297-78934-1 reprinted by the Folio Society, 2003
- The English: A Social History (Grafton, 1987) ISBN 0246121815
- A Guide to Royal London (Pan Macmillan, 1987)
- Venice: The Biography of a City (Grafton, 1988)
- The Encyclopaedia of Oxford (Macmillan, 1988)
- London's Churches assisted by Tessa Street with photographs by Martin Black (Queen Anne Press, 1988) ISBN 0-356-12762-1
- Redcoats and Rebels: The War for America, 1770-1781 (Grafton, 1990) ISBN 978-0393322934
- The Virgin Queen: The Personal History of Elizabeth I (Viking, 1990)
- Captain Gronow: His Reminiscences of Regency and Victorian Life, 1810-60 (Kyle Cathie, 1991) editor
- Florence: The Biography of a City (Viking, 1993) ISBN 0140166440
- Cavaliers & Roundheads: The English at War, 1642–1649 (HarperCollins, 1993)
- The Story of England (Phaidon Press, 1994)
- Nelson: A Personal History (Penguin, 1994) ISBN 978-0-14-016738-2
- No Ordinary Place: Radley College and the Public School System 1847–1997 (John Murray, 1997) ISBN 0-7195-5176-5
- Wellington: A Personal History (HarperCollins, 1997)
- George III: A Personal History (Penguin, 1998) ISBN 978-0-14-025737-3
- Queen Victoria: A Personal History (HarperCollins, 2000)
- The Marlboroughs: John and Sarah Churchill 1650-1744 (Viking, 2001)
- Napoleon: His Wives and Women (HarperCollins, 2002)
- Great Battles: Agincourt (Phoenix new edition 2003) ISBN 1842127187
- Disraeli: A Personal History (HarperCollins, 2004)
- The Borgias and Their Enemies: 1431-1519 (Orlando, Florida: Harcourt, 2008); also published as The House of Borgia (London: Constable, 2009) and as The Borgias (London: Constable, 2011).
- A Brief History of the Borgias: The Bloodiest Family of the Italian Renaissance. (Robinson Publishing, 2010).
