= The Roots of Evil =

1963 book by Christopher Hibbert

The Roots of Evil: A Social History of Crime and Punishment
- Author: Christopher Hibbert
- Publication date: 1963

The Roots of Evil: A Social History of Crime and Punishment is a book written by Christopher Hibbert in 1963 which traces the development of the social justice system, mostly from an English perspective, though information about the continent and the United States is also included.

== Overview ==
Cruel punishments have an inevitable tendency to produce cruelty...

— Sir Samuel Romilly 1813

With this conclusion, Hibbert traces the development and decline of cruel punishments, the guillotine in France and the modern prison in England, which still used hanging when the book was first published. The chapter Causes and Cures contains the salient point that "There seems, indeed, no surer way of keeping a boy [or girl] from a life of crime than providing him with a happy and worthwhile childhood in a family which loves him and which he loves", and suggests that while "a crime is only a crime when a law ... makes it so", pointing out that by the nineteenth century nine of the ten laws which Hebraic law punished with stoning "had ceased to be offences in civilized European societies". Although "Drink and drugs and speed and sex are exciting, and so is crime and in cities the opportunity for crime are extensive and the rewards are high, the chances of escape are greater and most of the police are overworked and some of them may be corruptible." While it is suggested that to change crime requires changing society, the last sentence of the chapter is "No completely satisfactory answers have yet been found."

The last chapter, Progress and Palindrome, points out that "the solution lies not in making punishments more severe, but in making them more certain and in relating them to each individual criminal, so that if he is reformable he may be reformed." Also, "there are germs of evil in the best of us and seeds of good in the worst", and there are no quick and inexpensive solutions to the problem of crime, which requires changing the soil, more than changing the seeds.

== Contents ==
- Part I: The Growth of Punishment 602 - 1750
  1. The Age of Chivalry
  2. The Age of Learning
  3. The Age of Elegance
- Part II: The Beginnings of Reform 1750 - 1945
  1. The Law Reformers
  2. The Police Reformers
  3. The Prison Reformers
- Part III: Criminal Man
  1. L'Uomo Delinquente
  2. Causes and Cures
  3. The Criminal's Psychology
- Part IV: The Crime Cult
- Part V: The Detection of Crime
- Part VI: The Great Melting Pot
  1. The New World
  2. Gangs and Syndicates
  3. Cops and G-Men
- Part VII: Present Problems
  1. Capital Punishment
  2. Corporal Punishment
  3. Prisons
  4. Police
  5. The Young Offender
  6. The Sexual Offender
- Part VIII: Progress and Palindrome
