= Martyn Skinner =

British poet (1906 – 1993)

Martyn Skinner (24 August 1906 – 25 October 1993) was a British poet. He won the 1943 Hawthornden Prize for Letters to Malaya and the Heinemann Award in 1947, for the last volume of that title, or the entire collection.

Skinner was born in Fitzhead, Somerset, in southwest England. His mother was Emelie Madeline Belling while his father, Sir Sydney Skinner, was chairman of multiple businesses.

Shortly after graduation Skinner, with fellow Oxford alumni Bede Griffiths and Hugh Waterman, settled in a cottage in the Cotswolds and began what they called an "experiment in common living". They followed a lifestyle attuned to nature, milking cows and selling the milk to support themselves. They would read the Bible together as a form of literature. Griffiths noted a strong connection between the teachings of scripture and the rhythm of the nature around them. The experiment lasted less than a year, as one of the friends found the life too demanding.

In 1938 Martyn Skinner married Pauline Giles, with whom he had three sons and one daughter before the marriage was dissolved in 1987.

According to John Clute, his "most ambitious works were two long narrative poems", or poem sequences. The Return of Arthur "is set in a Near Future England transformed into a totalitarian Dystopia; but a reborn Arthur from another Dimension returns, and the Matter of Britain is again told as the Millennium approaches". Old Rectory is set in a more distant "Ruined Earth Britain, where a hermit mage named Old Rectory decides to return to society and redeem it".

Skinner's correspondence with the novelist R. C. Hutchinson has been published as Two Men of Letters (1979), OCLC 6815559.

== Poems ==
- Sir Elfadore and Mabyna: A Poem in Four Cantos (1935), OCLC 7072426
- Letters to Malaya (1941 to 1947)
- Two Colloquies (1949) – "The Lobster of the Thatch" and "The Recluse", OCLC 11829050
- Merlin, or the Return of Arthur: A Satiric Epic (1951) Frederick Muller, London
- The Return of Arthur: A Poem of the Future (1955) Chapman & Hall, London
- The Return of Arthur: A Poem of the Future Part Two (1959) Chapman & Hall, London
- The Return of Arthur: A Poem of the Future (1951 to 1959); assembled and expanded 1966
- Old Rectory (1970 to 1977)
- Old Rectory, or the Interview (1984) Michael Russell, Salisbury
