= Redcoats and Rebels =

History book

Redcoats and Rebels: The American Revolution through British Eyes
- Author: Christopher Hibbert
- Language: English
- Genre: Non-fiction
- Publication date: 1990

Redcoats and Rebels: The American Revolution through British Eyes is a history of the American Revolutionary War (or using its British name "The American War of Independence") from the British perspective, by historian Christopher Hibbert. The book was first published in the UK in 1990, under the title Redcoats and Rebels: The War for America, 1770-1781.

== Editions ==
First published:

- 1990: Grafton Books as a Hardcover, 375-page publication.

Following editions include:

- April 2002: Norton paperback, 375-page publication.
- 2006: Folio Society hardcover, 400-page publication.
- February 2008: Pen and Sword paperback, 384-page publication.
