= Lawrence Sail =

British poet and writer

Lawrence Sail (born 29 October 1942) is a contemporary British poet and writer. His poems are known for their "scrupulous combination of close observation and broader reflections"; He is published by Bloodaxe Books. Sail's poetry collections include Eye-Baby (2006); The World Returning (2002), Building into Air (1995), and Out of Land: New and Selected Poems (1992). He has edited several prominent anthologies, including The New Exeter Book of Riddles (1999) with Kevin Crossley-Holland, and First and Always: Poems for Great Ormond Street Children’s Hospital (1988). Other works include his childhood memoir Cross-currents: essays (Enitharmon, 2005), Sift (Impress Books, 2010), and Songs of the Darkness which combines Sail's Christmas poems with his daughter's illustrations (Enitharmon, 2010).

== Biography ==
Sail was born in London and brought up in Exeter. He studied French and German at Oxford University and subsequently taught for some years in Kenya, before returning to the UK, where he taught at Blundell's School and, later, Exeter School (where the modern languages department was headed by Harry Guest, another published poet). He is now a freelance writer. He also edited South-West Review from 1980 to 1985. Sail works in schools and colleges, and has also written a radio play, as well as short features for radio. He has presented the BBC Radio 3 programme 'Poetry Now' and 'Time for Verse' on BBC Radio 4. He was chairman of the Arvon Foundation from 1990 to 1994, has directed the Cheltenham Literature Festival, was the UK jury member for the European Literature Prize (1994–96), has been a judge for the Whitbread Prize and is a Fellow of the Royal Society of Literature.

== Bibliography ==
- Opposite Views Dent, 1974
- The Drowned River Mandeville Press, 1978
- The Kingdom of Atlas Secker & Warburg, 1980
- South-West Review: A Celebration (editor) South West Arts, 1985
- Devotions Secker & Warburg, 1987
- Aquamarine The Gruffyground Press, 1988
- First and Always: Poems for Great Ormond Street Children's Hospital (compiler and editor) Faber and Faber, 1988
- Water (Poem Poster) (wood-engraving by Hellmuth Weissenborn) Friends of Cheltenham Literature Festival, 1989
- Air (Poem Poster) (wood-engraving by John O'Connor) Friends of Cheltenham Literature Festival, 1990
- Fire (Poem Poster) (wood-engraving by Gwenda Morgan) Friends of Cheltenham Literature Festival, 1991
- Earth (Poem Poster) (wood-engraving by Miriam MacGregor) Friends of Cheltenham Literature Festival, 1992
- Out of Land: New and Selected Poems Bloodaxe Books, 1992
- Building into Air Bloodaxe Books, 1995
- The New Exeter Book of Riddles (edited with Kevin Crossley-Holland; illustrated by Simon Drew) Enitharmon, 1999
- The World Returning Bloodaxe Books, 2002
- Cross-currents (essays) Enitharmon, 2005
- Light Unlocked: Christmas Card Poems (edited with Kevin Crossley-Holland; illustrated by John Lawrence) Enitharmon, 2005
- Eye-Baby Bloodaxe Books, 2006
- Waking Dreams: New & Selected Poems Bloodaxe Books, 2010
- The Cablecar Bloodaxe Books, 2002

== Prizes and awards ==
- 1992 Hawthornden Fellowship
- 1993 Arts Council Writers' Award
- 2004 Cholmondeley Award
