= Miriam Macgregor =

British author, illustrator, wood engraver and fine press compositor

- Born: 1935 (age 90–91); Shillong, Assam, India
- Education: Guildford School of Art
- Known for: Wood engraving, illustration

Miriam Macgregor (born 1935) is a British author, illustrator, wood engraver, and fine press compositor. Born in Shillong, Assam, Macgregor was educated at the Guildford School of Art. She began her professional career in the art department of the publisher B. T. Batsford, before becoming a freelance artist. In 1977, she began to work for the fine press publisher, Whittington Press. At the time, all type was set by hand. She still works at the Whittington Press as a compositor and illustrator. She has created images for other fine press publishers, including the Folio Society and Primrose Hill Press. Macgregor is a self-taught wood engraver and member of the Society of Wood Engravers and Royal Society of Painter-Printmakers. She has furnished wood engravings for the horticultural journal, Hortus, in addition to countless wood engravings and pochoir illustrations for books and posters published by the Whittington Press. In addition to the texts she has illustrated, her subjects primarily concern English rural life, farming, architecture, botany, and felines. Macgregor has published several collections of her own images, and curated a collection of contemporary wood engravings of cats, published by Primrose Hill Press in 1999 as Cat cuts.

== Selected titles ==
- Midwinter: wood-engravings. (Whittington Press, 2012)
- Miriam Macgregor: thirty-one wood engravings chosen by the artist with an autobiographical note. (Primrose Academy & Rampant Lions Press, 2003)
- Cat cuts: a collection of engravers' cats. (Primrose Hill Press, 1999)
- New Castle: a brief encounter. (Whittington Press, 1998)
- Country chaos. (Whittington Press, 1980)
