= Moortown Diary =

1979 poetry diary

First edition (Faber & Faber)

Moortown Diary, sometimes just known as Moortown, is a poetry diary which details the everyday life of a working farm, first published in 1979. The author, poet Ted Hughes, married Carol Orchard, a farmer's daughter, in 1970. Ted and his father-in-law, Jack Orchard, ran Moortown farm near Winkleigh in Mid Devon. The book contains a moving tribute to Jack Orchard, who died in 1976.

Ted later gave up farming, but kept the farmhouse. He used the building for accommodating writers and poets, notably Seamus Heaney. He sold the farmhouse about a year before his death.

== Poems ==
Some poems in the collection include:

- Rain
- Dehorning
- Bringing in New Couples
- Tractor
- Roe-Deer
- Sketching a Thatcher
- Ravens
- February 17
- Birth of Rainbow
- The Day He Died
