= The Destruction of Lord Raglan =

1961 book by Christopher Hibbert

- First edition cover
- Author: Christopher Hibbert
- Publisher: Little, Brown
- Publication date: 1961

The Destruction of Lord Raglan: A tragedy of the Crimean War, 1854–55 is a non-fiction historical work by Christopher Hibbert, originally published by Longman in 1961. The work is a portrait of Lord Raglan, commander-in-chief of British forces during the Crimean War.

Raglan was sent to the Crimea in 1854, with the first aim of defending Constantinople. He was ordered to besiege the Russian naval base of Sevastopol and won the Battle of Alma, but Raglan’s confused orders caused the fateful Charge of the Light Brigade at the Battle of Balaclava. The Battle of Inkerman went better, but Raglan was blamed by the press and the government for the sufferings of the British soldiers in the terrible Crimean winter during the Siege of Sevastopol, owing to shortages of food and clothing. A badly planned allied assault on Sevastopol on 18 June 1855 was a complete failure, and Raglan died on 28 June, after suffering from dysentery and depression.

Drawing on contemporary letters, papers, and diaries, Hibbert re-assesses both Raglan and the war, suggesting that the chaos of the conflict was the tragic result, not of one man's neglect, but of the whole nation's folly.
