= Statue of James Cook, Hyde Park =

1879 statue by Thomas Woolner in Sydney, Australia

Captain James Cook
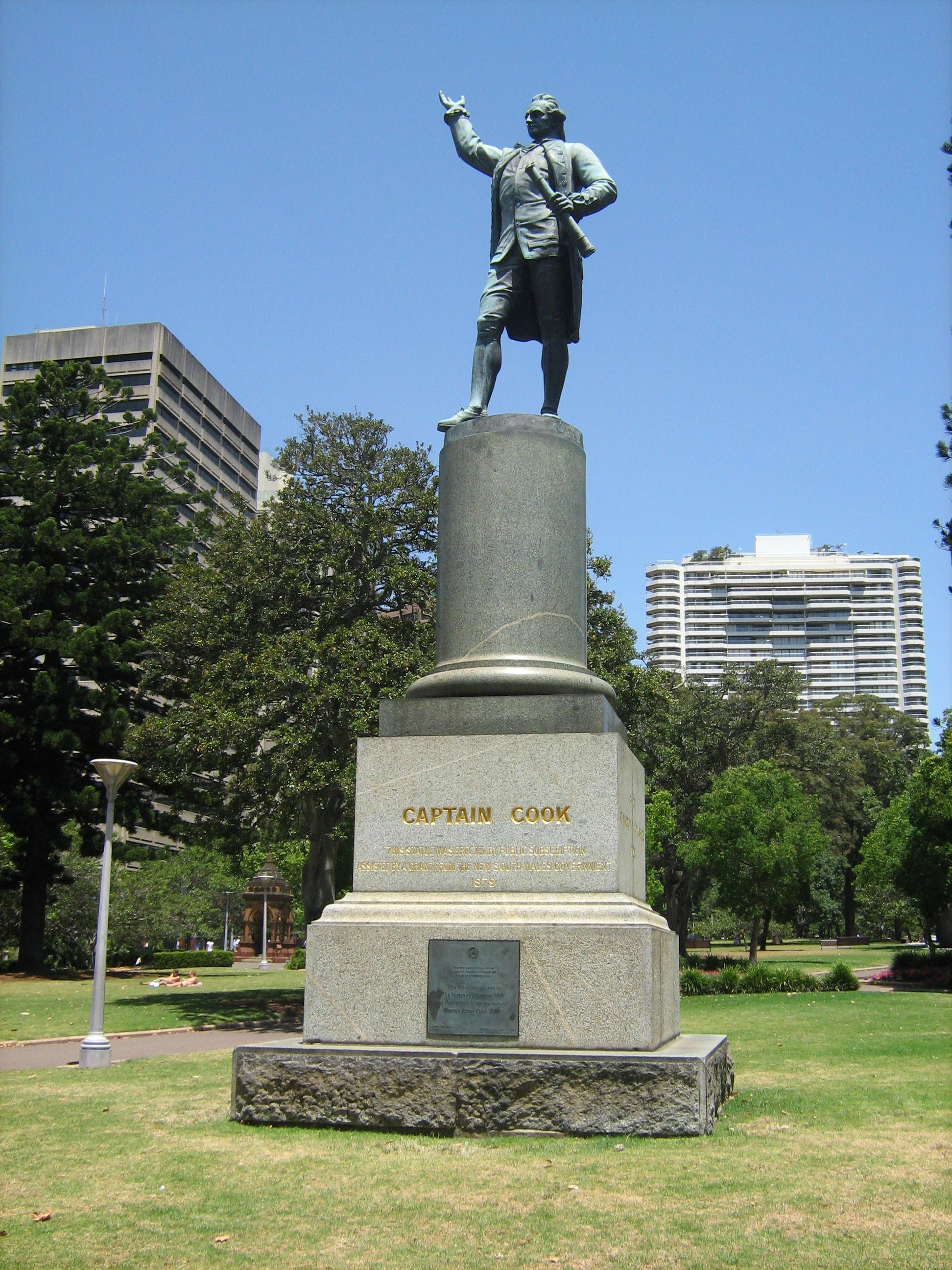
- Artist: Thomas Woolner
- Year: 1879; 147 years ago
- Type: Statue
- Medium: Bronze
- Subject: James Cook
- Location: Hyde Park, Sydney, New South Wales, Australia; 33°52′27″S 151°12′43″E

A bronze statue of the British explorer Captain James Cook stands in Hyde Park, Sydney, Australia. Designed by Pre-Raphaelite Brotherhood sculptor Thomas Woolner and unveiled in 1879, the statue is larger than life and depicts Cook holding a telescope in his left hand with his right hand extended towards the sky.

== History ==
=== Inception ===
Interest in the construction of a statue of James Cook preceded its creation by over a decade. Starting in the 1860s, the Australia Patriotic Association held a public appeal for donations to erect a "double life-size bronze and granite" statue of Cook in Sydney's Hyde Park. The Cook Statue Fund, launched by the APA at a public meeting at Victoria Theatre in Sydney, raised £1,777.

=== Construction ===
On 27 March 1869, Prince Alfred, the second son of Queen Victoria, laid the foundation stone during a well-attended gala at Hyde Park. Following the ceremony, however, the pedestal remained empty for nine years due to difficulties in raising additional funds; the Cook Statue Committee then asked the premier of New South Wales for assistance. Once Parliament voted to fund completion of the monument, Thomas Woolner, a fellow of the Royal Academy in London who had once lived in Australia, was commissioned for the sculpture.

In a letter to Woolner dated 26 September 1874, Colonial Secretary Sir Henry Parkes requested the prolific sculptor send a design for the statue along with size and material specifications and a probable timeframe for its creation. Parkes directed that since the ‘position in Hyde Park is a very exposed one…the statue must be of bronze’. It was built by Cox & Sons at Thames Ditton Foundry in Surrey, England. In 1878, the statue was briefly displayed opposite London's Athenaeum Club prior to being shipped to Sydney. It was described in The Art Journal as “unquestionably a work designed with force and spirit that raise it to the character of the sensational”.

The granite base of the statue was transported from a quarry in Moruya, New South Wales, initially by being rolled along a wooden-railed bush tram line, covering six miles and taking three days. It was then transported to Sydney by the 80-ton schooner Settler's Friend. On the second night out, a few miles off Jervis Bay, the schooner collided with a 400-ton barque headed in the same direction. An axe was used to separate the ships and the jury-rigged Settler's Friend entered Port Jackson three days later.

=== Dedication ===
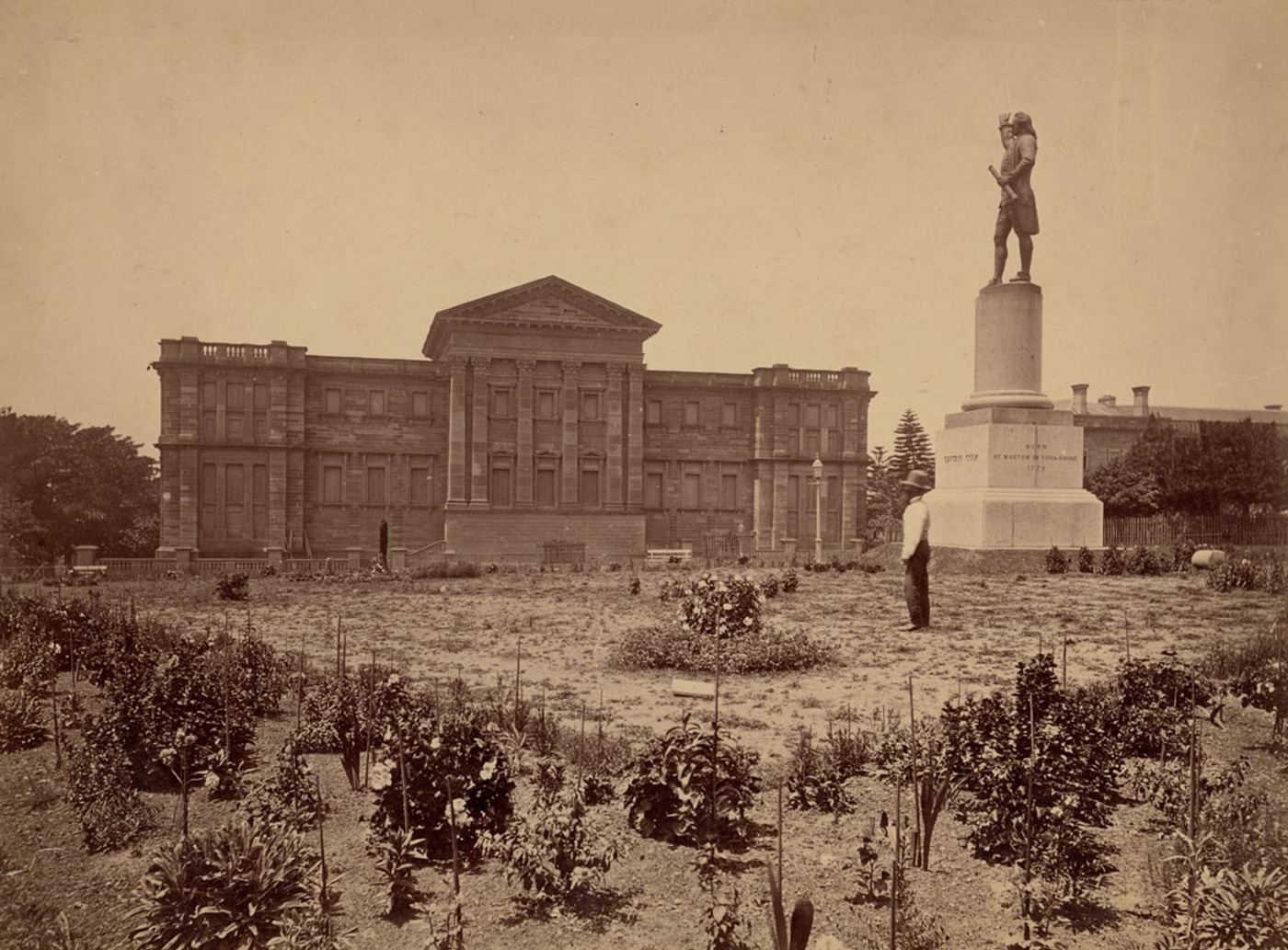
Cook's statue, circa 1885, six years after its dedication

The statue was dedicated on Tuesday 25 February 1879. The day of the statue's unveiling was declared a public holiday. Approximately 12,000 joined the procession to Hyde Park and the unveiling itself was attended by an estimated 60,000 people.

[From Our Sydney Correspondent]. SYDNEY. 7.30 p.m. The ceremony of unveiling Captain Cook's statue took place today, and was a great success. The procession was composed of marines, volunteers, and friendly societies, and was the largest ever seen in Sydney. The ceremony was witnessed by about 60,000 people. Two hundred children sang the National Anthem. His Excellency the Governor, Sir Hercules Robinson, unveiled the statue; and; in doing so, made a speech, in which he gave a narrative of Cook's life, and characterised him as a humane, just, and God-fearing man. He added that it would be well for the youth of Australia to imitate his nobility of character. – Newcastle Morning Herald and Miners' Advocate, 26 February 1879.

The procession, two miles in length, featured marines, naval, fire & military brigades, associated bodies and thirteen bands. The statue was enshrouded in a Union Jack before being unveiled by six soldiers. The South Australian Advertiser reported that the unveiling "is acknowledged to have been the most patriotic ceremony which has ever taken place in New South Wales." In attendance was "nearly every member" of both houses of parliament, Anglican Bishop Barker, Catholic Archbishop Vaughan and numerous other distinguished persons.

An electric light placed atop the post office was exhibited on the same night, illuminating the city and the face of Cook's statue, and "sufficient to enable one to read a newspaper two miles away."

== Inscription controversy ==
=== Previous exploration of Australia ===
Critics have pointed out that although the inscription states that Cook "discovered this territory" in 1770, in fact, Cook's party landed at Botany Bay, several miles to the southwest, and never managed to find Sydney Harbour. Although Cook was the first to "claim the land on behalf of Great Britain", he was not the first modern navigator to "discover" Australia. Visits to Australia were recorded as early as 1606.

=== Role of public subscription ===
In The Captain Cook Myth, author Jillian Robertson argues that the inscription stating that the statue had been "erected by public subscription assisted by a grant from the New South Wales Government" is also misleading. According to Robertson, only one quarter of funding for the statue came from public donations; the rest was covered by the government.

== Architecture ==
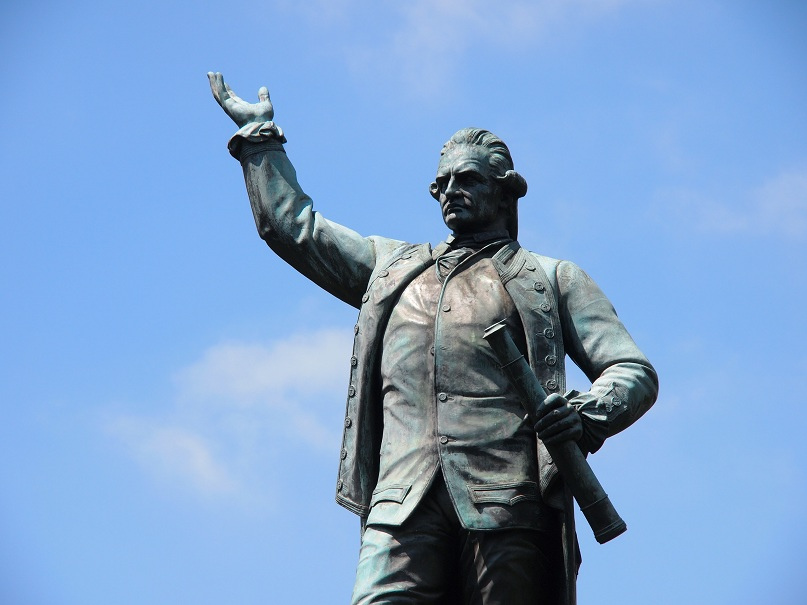
Close-up of statue

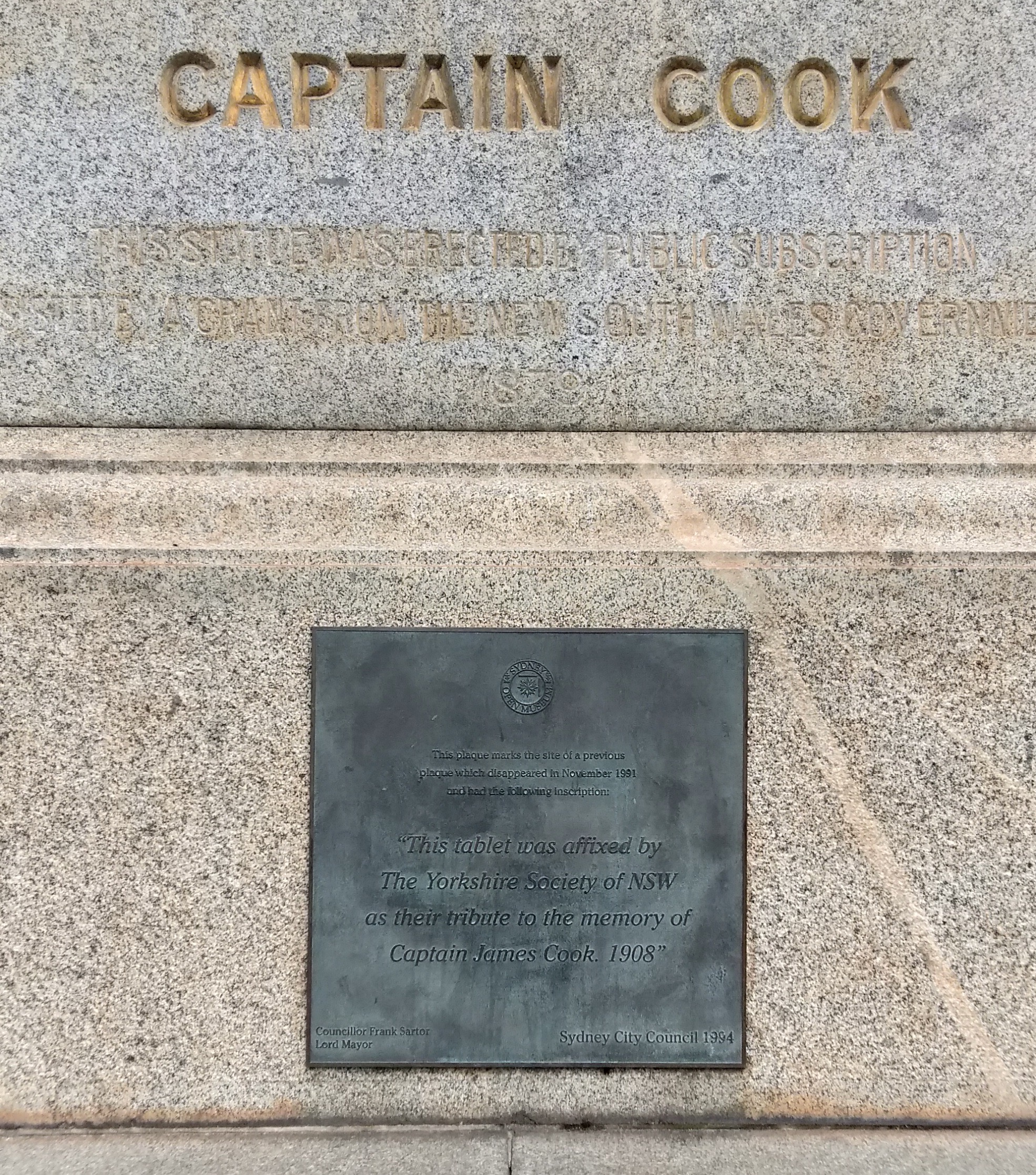

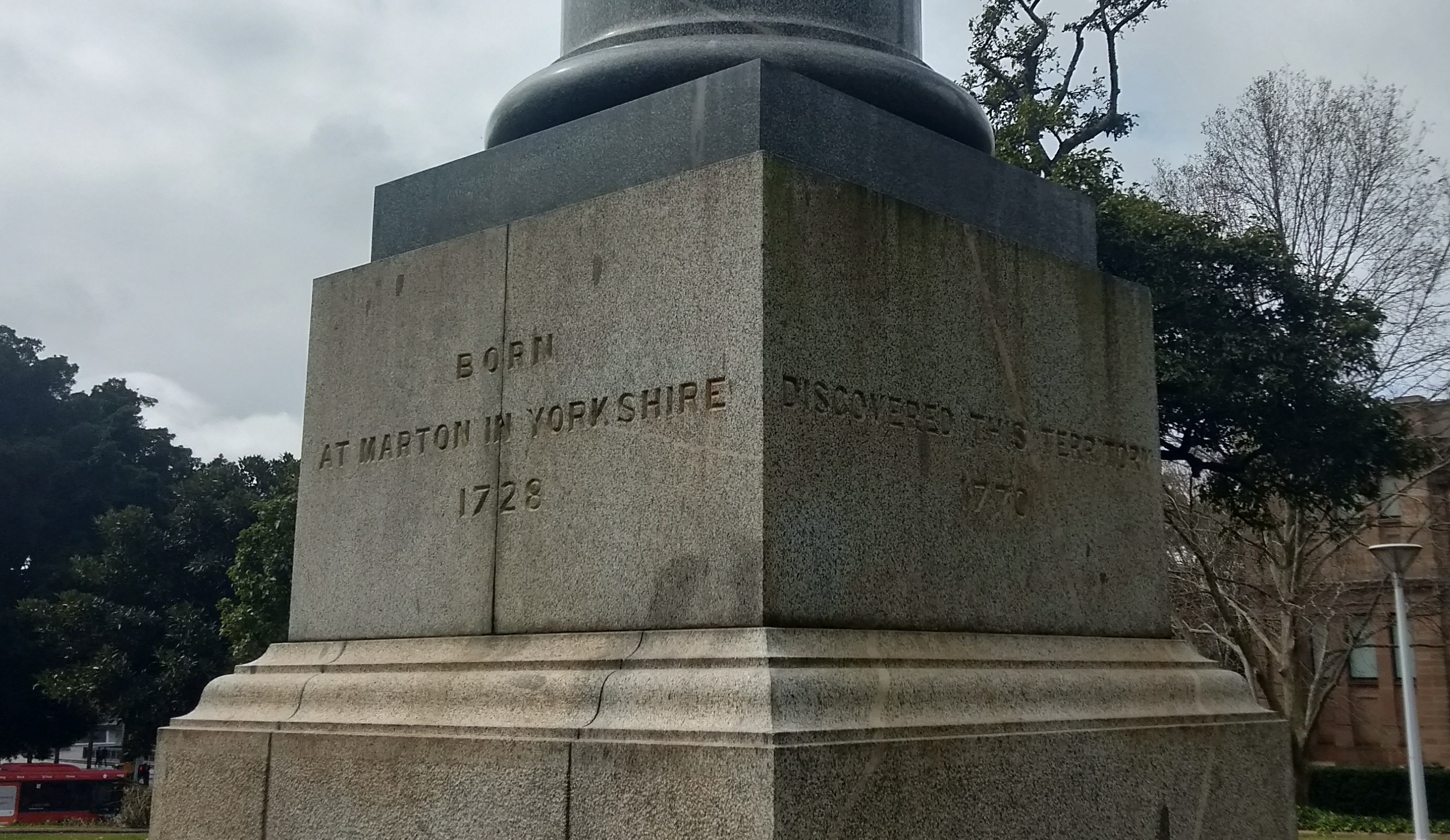

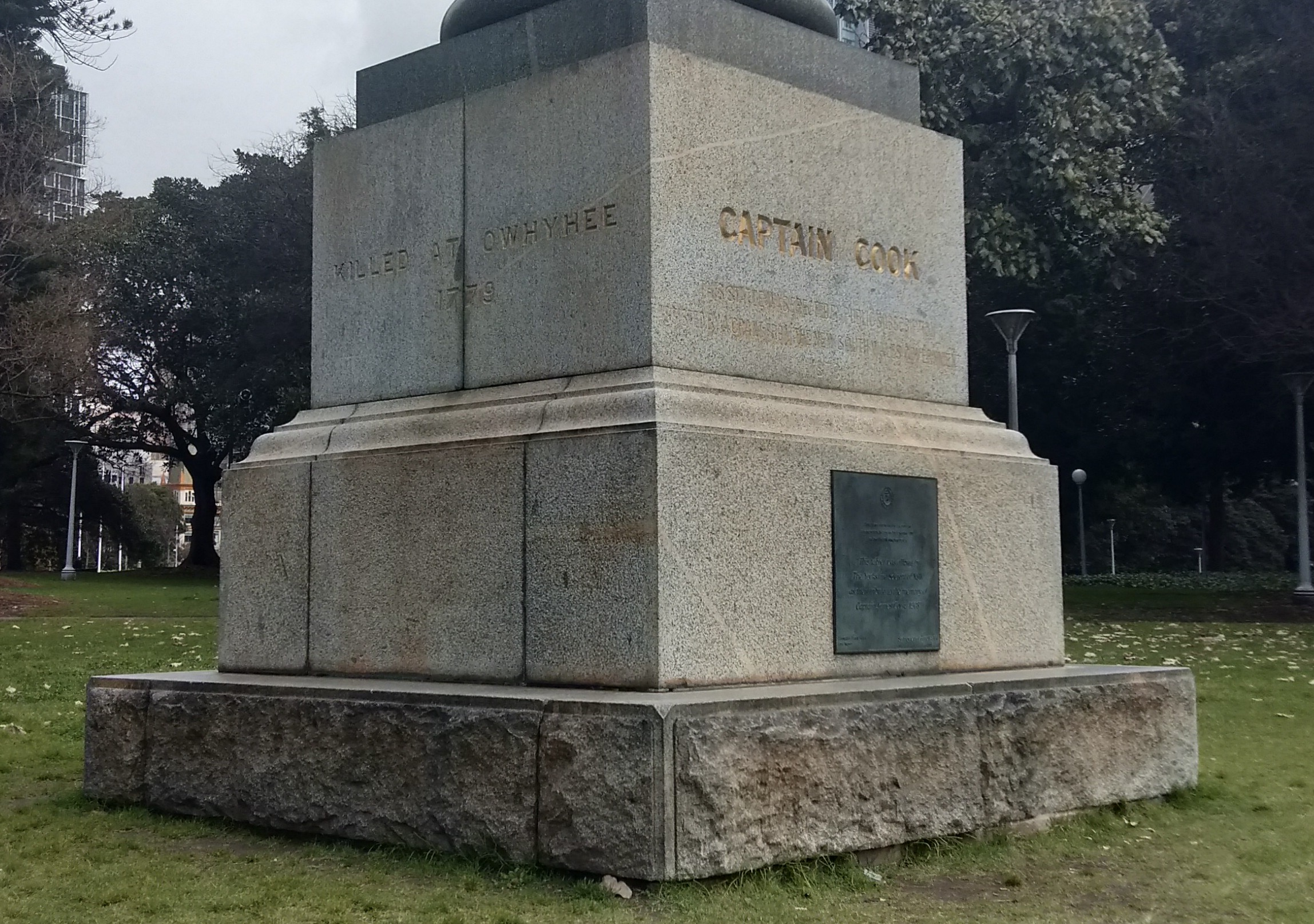

Thomas Woolner depicted Cook with a telescope in his left hand and his right hand extended skyward. The statue is larger than Cook was himself. In 1931, The Sydney Morning Herald noted that his telescope is "at rest":

Having looked through the telescope, he is satisfied that the great Southland is at last found – he is in the act of proclaiming his great discovery.

The granite base is a single block weighing between fifteen and eighteen tons.

=== Inscriptions ===
There is an inscription on each side of the statue's plinth, in addition to a plaque on the front side. These read as follows:

==== Front inscription ====
Captain Cook.

This statue was erected by public subscription assisted by a grant from the New South Wales Government

1879

===== Plaque =====
This plaque marks the site of a previous plaque which disappeared in November 1991 and had the following inscription :

"This tablet was affixed by the Yorkshire Society of NSW as their tribute to the memory of Captain James Cook. 1908"

Councillor Frank Sartor Lord Mayor

Sydney City Council 1994

==== Left inscription ====
Born at Marton in Yorkshire

1728

==== Back inscription ====
Discovered this territory

1770

==== Right inscription ====
Killed at Owhyee

1779

== Gallery ==
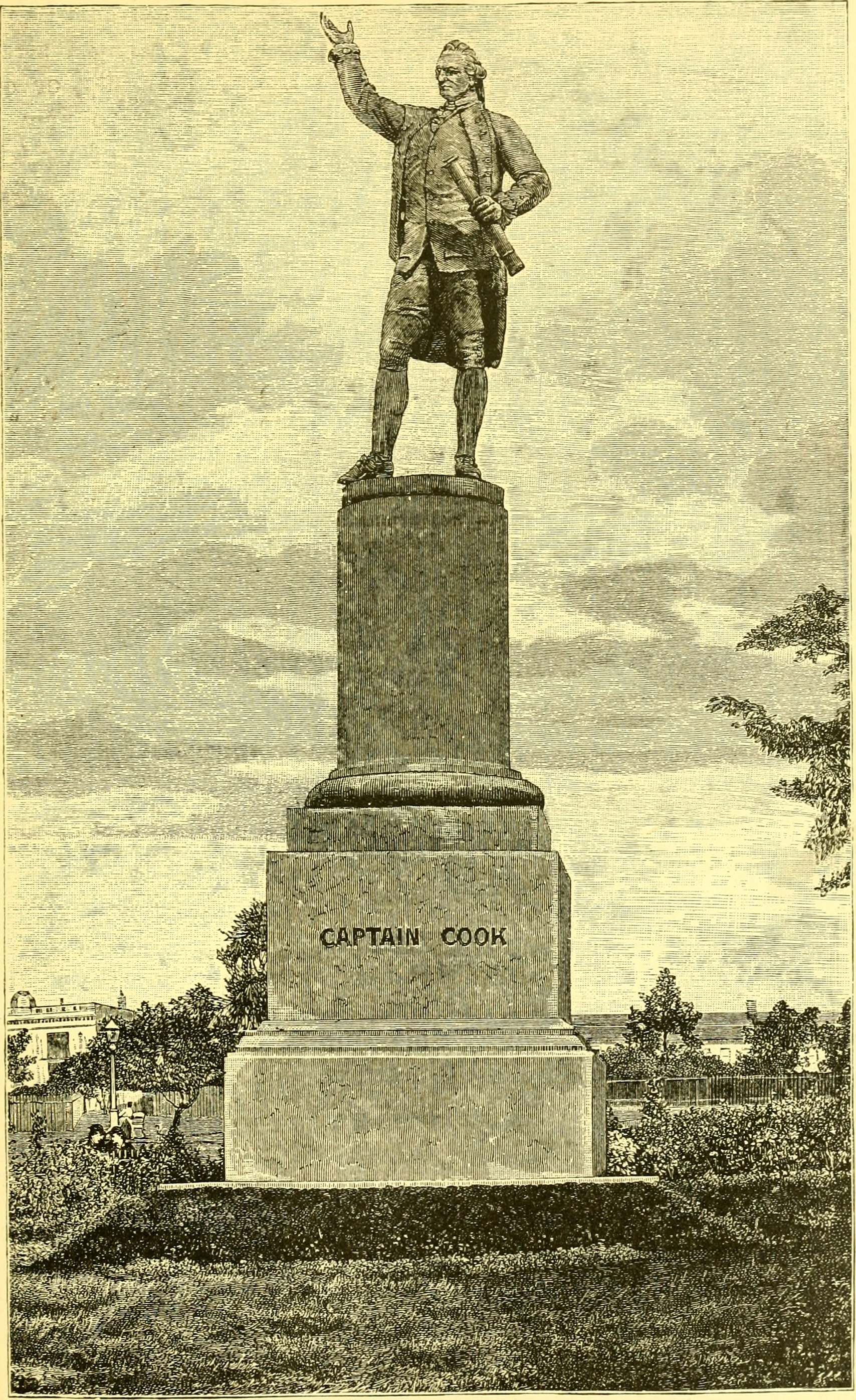
Illustration from 1889

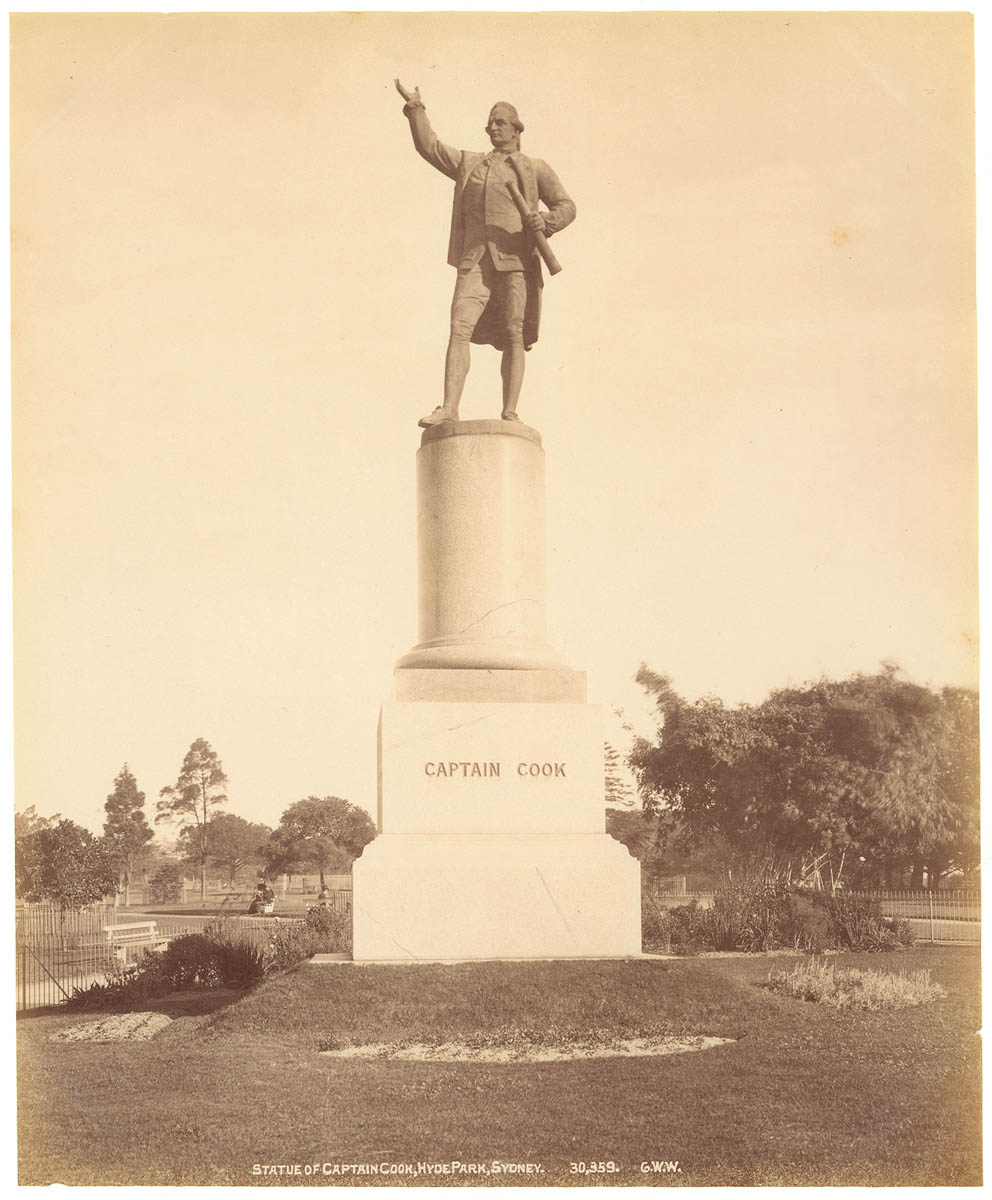
Statue, circa 1893

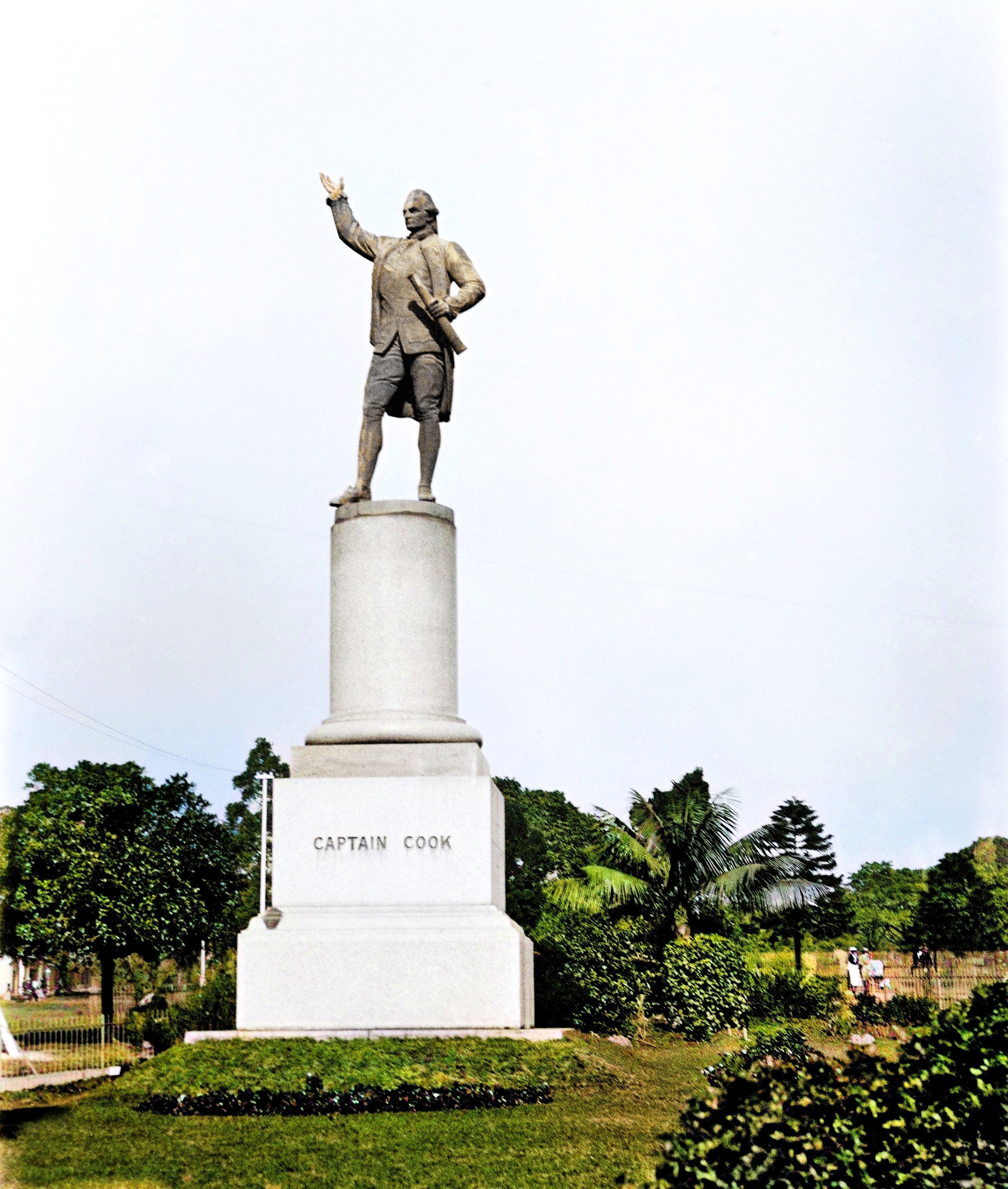
Statue in 1901

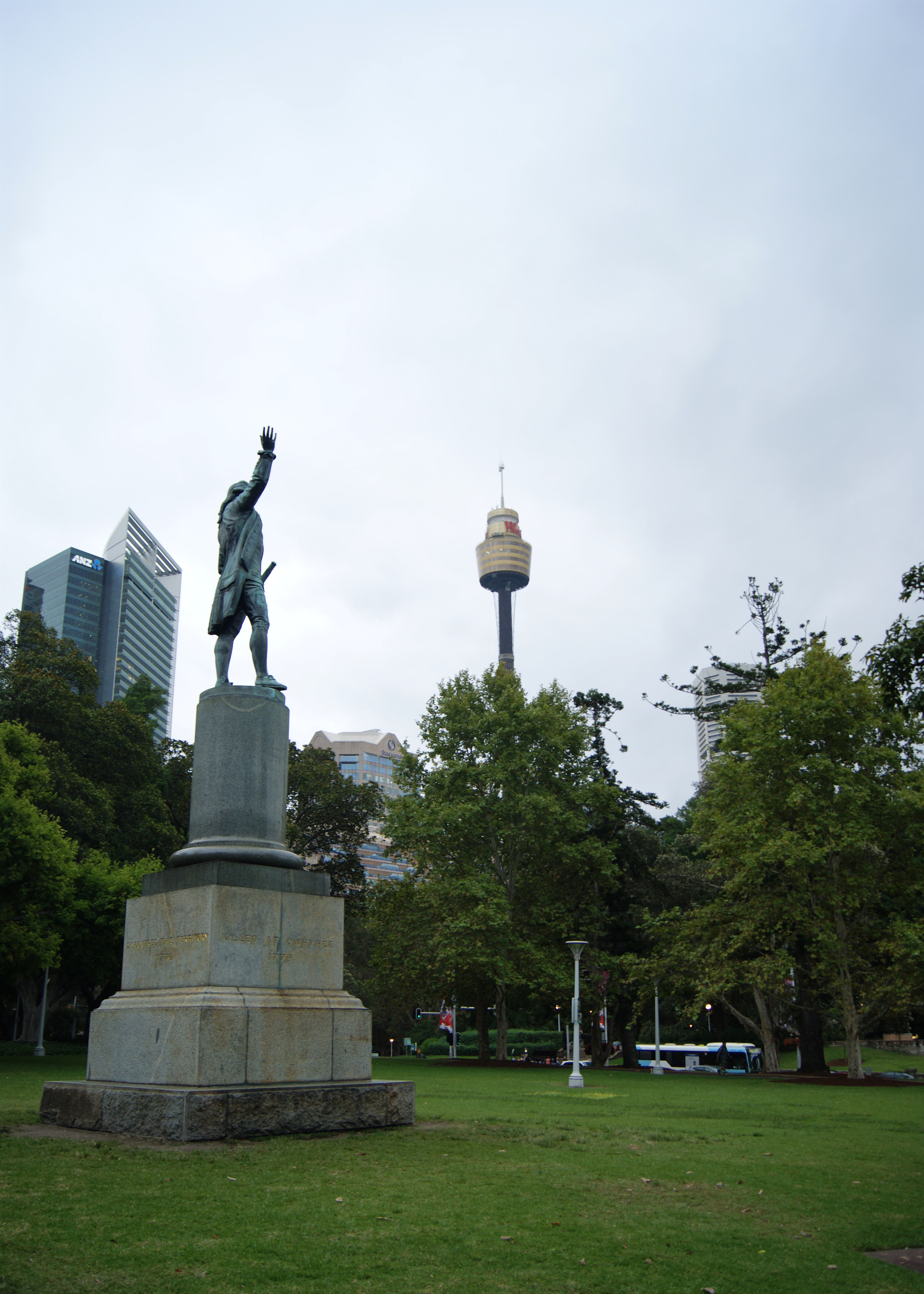
Statue in 2018
