= Kit Wright =

English author (born 1944)

Kit Wright FRSL
- Born: 17 June 1944 (age 82); Crockham Hill, England
- Education: Oxford University
- Known for: Poet and children's author
- Awards: Geoffrey Faber Memorial Prize; Hawthornden Prize; Alice Hunt Bartlett Prize; Heinemann Award

Kit Wright FRSL (born 17 June 1944) is an English writer who is the author of more than twenty-five books, for both adults and children, and the winner of awards including an Arts Council Writers' Award, the Geoffrey Faber Memorial Prize, the Hawthornden Prize, the Alice Hunt Bartlett Prize and the Heinemann Award. After a scholarship to Oxford University, he worked as a lecturer at Brock University, St Catherine's, in Canada, then returned to England and a position in the Poetry Society. He is currently a full-time writer.

== Biography ==
Wright was born in Crockham Hill, Kent. Educated at Oxford University, Wright moved to Canada to work as a lecturer. In 1970, he returned to London to work as an Education Officer for the Poetry Society until 1975. From 1977 to 1979, he was Fellow Commoner in Creative Art at Cambridge University. He subsequently returned to London and works full-time as a writer. He currently contributes monthly to The Oldie magazine.

He was elected a Fellow of the Royal Society of Literature (FRSL) in 1997.

== Awards ==
- 1977: Alice Hunt Bartlett Prize (awarded for The Bear Looked Over the Mountain)
- 1978: Geoffrey Faber Memorial Prize (awarded for The Bear Looked Over the Mountain)
- 1985: Arts Council Writers' Award
- 1990: Heinemann Award (awarded for Short Afternoons)
- 1991: Hawthornden Prize (awarded for Short Afternoons)
- 1995: Cholmondeley Award
- 1997: Elected a Fellow of the Royal Society of Literature
- 1999: King's Lynn Award for Merit in Poetry
- 2009: Honorary Fellowship at the English Association

== Bibliography ==
- Soundings: A Selection of Poems for Reading Aloud (editor), Heinemann Education, 1975
- The Bear Looked Over the Mountain, Salamander, 1977
- Arthur's Father (illustrated by Eileen Browne), Methuen, 1978
- Arthur's Granny (illustrated by Eileen Browne), Methuen, 1978
- Arthur's Sister (illustrated by Eileen Browne), Methuen, 1978
- Arthur's Uncle (illustrated by Eileen Browne), Methuen, 1978
- Rabbiting on and Other Poems (illustrated by Posy Simmonds), Fontana Lions, 1978
- Hot Dog and Other Poems (illustrated by Posy Simmonds), Kestrel, 1981
- Professor Potts Meets the Animals in Africa, Watts, 1981
- Hot Dog and Other Poems, Puffin, 1982
- Bump-Starting the Hearse, Hutchinson, 1983
- From the Day Room, Windows Project, 1983
- Poems for Ten Year Olds and Over, Viking Kestrel, 1984
- Poems for Nine Year Olds and Under, Puffin, 1985
- Cat Amorel, 1987
- One of Your Legs is Both the Same: A Poem, Turret, 1987
- Poems 1974-1983, Hutchinson, 1988
- Short Afternoons, Hutchinson, 1989
- Puffin Portable Poets (contributor), Puffin, 1990
- Funnybunch: New Puffin Book of Funny Verse, Viking, 1993
- Tigerella (illustrated by Peter Bailey), André Deutsch, 1993
- Great Snakes (illustrated by Posy Simmonds), Viking, 1994
- Dolphinella (illustrated by Peter Bailey), André Deutsch, 1995
- Rumpelstiltskin, Scholastic, 1998
- Hoping It Might Be So: Poems 1974-2000, Leviathan, 2000
- Write Away, Times Supplements, 2000
- Ode to Didcot Power Station, Bloodaxe Books, 2014
