= Edward Stanford Travel Writing Awards =

Annual award

The Edward Stanford Travel Writing Awards (ESTWA) are a series of awards that recognize travel books and authors from around the world. The centrepiece of the awards is the Stanford Travel Book of the Year, which has been awarded every year since 2006 under several names and sponsors, beginning as the Dolman Best Travel Book Award.

== History ==
The first Dolman Best Travel Book Award was given in 2006, two years after the Thomas Cook Travel Book Award, which had run for 20 years, was abandoned by its sponsor. From 2006 through 2014 the prize was organised by the Authors' Club and was sponsored by and named after a club member, the reverend and H.M. Coroner Bill Dolman, who was also a regular BBC broadcaster. The prize was £1,000 in 2008 and £2,500 from 2009.

In 2015 the prize was rebranded as the Stanford Dolman Travel Book of the Year and became the centrepiece of the Edward Stanford Travel Writing Awards, a new scheme supported by the London travel bookshop Stanfords, with the prize money doubled to £5,000. Dolman also continued to sponsor and organize it through the Authors' Club. Many new categories of awards were added that increased the number of winners each year to thirteen.

In December 2022, Dolman said he was no longer able to give financial support. From the 2023 awards, Stanfords sponsored and organized the prize on its own as the Stanford Travel Book of the Year, and cut the awards scheme back to four prizes. From 2024 the awards were organized by Stanford and sponsored by Viking Cruises, and by 2025 the scheme was reduced to three awards. Winners receive a globe as a trophy: an antique globe in 2018, and from 2019 a handmade globe with a design made exclusively for the awards, made by Lander & May, a craftsman globe maker.

== Active ==
=== Stanford Travel Book of the Year ===
= winner

"Stanford Travel Book of the Year":

2026

- Sophy Roberts, A Training School for Elephants
- Shafik Meghji, Small Earthquakes: A Journey Through Lost British History
- Monisha Rajesh, Moonlight Express: Around the World By Night Train
- Robert Macfarlane, Is a River Alive?
- Mariana Enriquez, Somebody Is Walking on Your Grave: My Cemetery Journey
- María Sonia Cristoff, False Calm

2025

- Noo Saro-Wiwa, Black Ghosts: A Journey Into The Lives Of Africans In China
- Clare Hammond, On the Shadow Tracks: A Journey through Occupied Myanmar
- Tom Chesshyre, Slow Trains to Istanbul: ...And Back: A 4,570-Mile Adventure on 55 Rides
- James Rebanks, The Place of Tides
- Phoebe Smith, Wayfarer: Love, Loss and Life on Britain's Ancient Paths
- Jeff Young, Wild Twin

2024

- Ghaith Abdul-Ahad, A Stranger in Your Own City: Travels in the Middle East’s Long War
- Alice Albinia, The Britannias: An Archipelago’s Tale
- Mary Colwell, The Gathering Place: A Winter Pilgrimage Through Changing Times
- Tim Hannigan, The Granite Kingdom: A Cornish Journey
- Leon McCarron, Wounded Tigris: A River Journey Through the Cradle of Civilisation
- Tom Parfitt, High Caucasus: A Mountain Quest in Russia’s Haunted Hinterland

2023

- Silvia Vasquez-Lavado, In the Shadow of the Mountain: A Memoir of Courage
- Alex Bescoby, The Last Overland: Singapore to London: The Return Journey of the Iconic Land Rover Expedition
- Erika Fatland, High: A Journey Across the Himalayas Through Pakistan, India, Bhutan, Nepal and China
- Tobias Jones, The Po: An Elegy for Italy’s Longest River
- Rebecca Lowe, The Slow Road to Tehran: A Revelatory Bike Ride through Europe and the Middle East
- Shafik Meghji, Crossed Off the Map: Travels in Bolivia
- Alice Morrison, Walking with Nomads
- Mary Novakovich, My Family and Other Enemies: Life and Travels in Croatia’s Hinterland

"Stanford Dolman Travel Book of the Year":

2022

- Colin Thubron, The Amur River: Between Russia and China
- Polly Barton, Fifty Sounds: A Memoir of Language, Learning, and Longing
- Tharik Hussain, Minarets in the Mountains: A Journey into Muslim Europe
- Nina Mingya Powles, Small Bodies of Water
- Joseph Zárate, Wars of the Interior

2021

- Paolo Cognetti, Without Ever Reaching the Summit: A Himalayan Journey
- Erika Fatland, The Border: A Journey Around Russia Through North Korea, China, Mongolia, Kazakhstan, Azerbaijan, Georgia, Ukraine, Belarus, Lithuania, Poland, Latvia, Estonia, Finland, Norway, and the Northeast Passage
- Taran Khan, Shadow City: A Woman Walks Kabul
- Nanjala Nyabola, Traveling While Black: Essays Inspired by a Life on the Move
- Jini Reddy, Wanderland: A Search for Magic in the Landscape
- Sophy Roberts, The Lost Pianos of Siberia
- C J Schuler, Along the Amber Route: St Petersburg to Venice
- Jonathan C Slaght, Owls of the Eastern Ice: The Quest to Find and Save the World's Largest Owl

2020

- Robert Macfarlane, Underland: A Deep Time Journey
- Rory Mclean, Pravda Ha Ha: True Travels to the End of Europe
- Paul Theroux, On the Plain of Snakes: A Mexican Journey
- Nicholas Jubber, Epic Continent: Adventures in the Great Stories of Europe
- Simon Winder, Lotharingia: A Personal History of Europe's Lost Country
- Anna Sherman, The Bells Of Old Tokyo: Travels in Japanese Time
- Richard Bassett, Last Days in Old Europe: Trieste '79, Vienna '85, Prague '89
- Monisha Rajesh, Around the World in 80 Trains: A 45,000-Mile Adventure
- Sara Wheeler, Mud and Stars: Travels in Russia with Pushkin, Tolstoy, and Other Geniuses of the Golden Age

2019

- William Atkins, The Immeasurable World: Journeys in Desert Places
- Ben Coates, The Rhine: Following Europe's Greatest River from Amsterdam to the Alps
- Damian Le Bas, The Stopping Places: A Journey Through Gypsy Britain
- Alev Scott, Map and Illustration by Jamie Whyte, Ottoman Odyssey: Travels Through a Lost Empire
- Witold Szablowski, Dancing Bears: True Stories about Longing for the Old Days (translated from Polish by Antonia Lloyd Jones)
- Daniel Trilling, Lights in the Distance: Exile and Refuge at the Borders of Europe

2018

- Patrick Barkham, Islander: A Journey Around Our Archipelago
- Garrett Carr, The Rule of the Land: Walking Ireland's Border
- Kapka Kassabova, Border: A Journey to the Edge of Europe
- Kushanava Choudhury, The Epic City: The World on the Streets of Calcutta
- Philip Hoare, Risingtidefallingstar: In Search of the Soul of the Sea
- Nick Hunt, Where the Wild Winds Are: Walking Europe's Winds from the Pennines to Provence
- Isambard Wilkinson, Photographs by Chev Wilkinson, Travels in a Dervish Cloak

2017 no award

2016

- James Attlee, Station To Station: Searching for Stories On The Great Western Line
- Geoff Dyer, White Sands: Experiences from the Outside World
- Elisabeth Luard, Squirrel Pie (and other stories): Adventures in Food Across the Globe
- Jim Perrin, The Hills of Wales
- Julian Sayarer, Interstate: Hitchhiking Through the State of a Nation
- Paul Theroux, Deep South: Four Seasons on Back Roads

2015

- Philip Marsden, Rising Ground: A Search for the Spirit of Place
- Helena Attlee, The Land Where Lemons Grow: The Story of Italy and Its Citrus Fruit
- Horatio Clare, Down to the Sea in Ships: Of Ageless Oceans and Modern Men
- Nick Hunt, Walking the Woods and the Water: In Patrick Leigh Fermor's footsteps from the Hook of Holland to the Golden Horn
- Jens Mühling, A Journey into Russia
- Elizabeth Pisani, Indonesia, Etc: Exploring the Improbable Nation

"Dolman Best Travel Book Award":

2014

- Oliver Bullough, The Last Man in Russia: The Struggle to Save a Dying Nation
- Patrick Leigh Fermor, The Broken Road: From the Iron Gates to Mount Athos
- Charlotte Higgins, Under Another Sky: Journeys in Roman Britain
- Iain Sinclair, American Smoke: Journeys to the End of the Light
- Sylvain Tesson, Consolations of the Forest: Alone in a Cabin in the Middle Taiga
- Sara Wheeler, O My America!: Second Acts in a New World

2013

- Noo Saro-Wiwa, Looking For Transwonderland: Travels in Nigeria
- Jeremy Seal, Meander: East to West Along a Turkish River
- Kathleen Jamie, Sightlines: A Conversation with the Natural World (co-winner)
- A. A. Gill, The Golden Door: Letters to America
- Robert MacFarlane, The Old Ways: A Journey on Foot (co-winner)
- Michael Jacobs, The Robber of Memories: A River Journey Through Colombia

2012

- Julia Blackburn, Thin Paths: Journeys in and around an Italian Mountain Village
- John Gimlette, Wild Coast: Travels on South America's Untamed Edge
- Jacek Hugo-Bader, White Fever: A Journey to the Frozen Heart of Siberia
- Olivia Laing, To the River: A Journey Beneath the Surface
- Sharifa Rhodes-Pitts, Harlem is Nowhere: A Journey to the Mecca of Black America
- Colin Thubron, To a Mountain in Tibet

2011

- Nicolas Jubber, Drinking Arak off an Ayatollah's Beard: A Journey Through the Inside-Out Worlds of Iran and Afghanistan
- Rachel Polonsky, Molotov's Magic Lantern: A Journey in Russian History
- Katherine Russell Rich, Dreaming in Hindi: Coming Awake in Another Language
- Graham Robb, Parisians: An Adventure History of Paris
- Douglas Rogers, The Last Resort: A Memoir of Zimbabwe
- Simon Winder, Germania: In Wayward Pursuit of the Germans and Their History

2010

- William Blacker, Along the Enchanted Way: A Story of Love and Life in Romania
- Horatio Clare, A Single Swallow: Following an Epic Journey from South Africa to South Wales
- Matthew Engel, Eleven Minutes Late: A Train Journey to the Soul of Britain
- Daniel Metcalfe, Out of Steppe: The Lost Peoples of Central Asia
- Susan Richards, Lost and Found in Russia: Encounters in the Deep Heartland
- Hugh Thomson, Tequila Oil: Getting Lost in Mexico
- Ian Thomson, The Dead Yard: A Story of Modern Jamaica

2009

- Alice Albinia, Empires of the Indus: The Story of a River
- Andrew Brown, Fishing in Utopia: Sweden and the Future that Disappeared
- Richard Grant, Bandit Roads: Into the Lawless Heart of Mexico
- Kapka Kassabova, Street Without a Name: Childhood and Other Misadventures in Bulgaria
- Grevel Lindop, Travels on the Dance Floor: One Man's Journey to the Heart of Salsa
- Dervla Murphy, The Island that Dared: Journeys in Cuba

2008

- Tim Butcher, Blood River: A Journey to Africa's Broken Heart
- Henry Hemming, Misadventure in the Middle East: Travels as Tramp, Artist & Spy
- John Lucas, 92 Acharnon Street: A Year in Athens
- Robert Macfarlane, The Wild Places
- Christopher Robbins, In Search of Kazakhstan: The Land that Disappeared

"Dolman Best First Travel Book Award":

2007

- Rory McCarthy, Nobody Told Us We Are Defeated: Stories from the New Iraq
- David McKie, Great British Bus Journeys: Travels Through Unfamous Places
- Tom Parry, Thumbs Up Australia: Hitchhiking the Outback
- Claire Scobie, Last Seen in Lhasa: The Story of an Extraordinary Friendship in Modern Tibet

2006

- Nicholas Jubber, The Prester Quest
- Joanna Kavenna, The Ice Museum: In Search of the Lost Land of Thule
- Ruth Padel, Tigers in Red Weather: A Quest for the Last Wild Tigers
- Richard Lloyd Parry, In the Time of Madness: Indonesia on the Edge of Chaos
- Stevie Smith, Pedalling to Hawaii: A Human-Powered Odyssey

=== Fiction with a Sense of Place ===
- 2026: Dur e Aziz Amna, A Splintering
- 2025: Elif Shafak, There Are Rivers in the Sky
- 2024: Abraham Verghese, The Covenant of Water
- 2023: no award
- 2022: Leïla Slimani, (translated by Sam Taylor),The Country of Others
- 2021: no award
- 2020: Nickolas Butler, Little Faith
- 2019: Novuyo Rosa Tshuma, House of Stone
- 2018: Tristan Hughes, Hummingbird
- 2017: no award
- 2016: Madeleine Thien, Do Not Say We Have Nothing

=== Children's Travel Book of the Year ===
- 2026: Teddy Keen, The Lost Book of Undersea Adventure by The Unknown Adventurer
- 2025: Iron Tazz, Hike It
- 2024: Mya-Rose Craig, Flight: Explore the secret routes of the skies from a bird’s-eye view…
- 2023: Hannah Gold The Lost Whale
- 2022: Zillah Bethell, The Shark Caller
- 2021: no award
- 2020: Chloe Daykin, Fire Girl, Forest Boy
- 2019: Alastair Humphreys, Alastair Humphreys' Great Adventurers
- 2018:: Katherine Rundell and illustrated by Hannah Horn, The Explorer
- 2017: no award
- 2016: Lucy Letherland, Rachel Williams & Emily Hawkins, Atlas of Animal Adventures

== Discontinued ==
=== Edward Stanford Outstanding Contribution to Travel Writing award ===
discontinued

A lifetime achievement award for travel writing.

- 2024: Nicholas Crane
- 2023: Tony Wheeler
- 2022: Hilary Bradt
- 2021: Dervla Murphy
- 2020: Paul Theroux
- 2019: Colin Thubron
- 2018: Jan Morris
- 2017: no award
- 2016: Michael Palin
- 2015: Bill Bryson

=== Photographic Travel Book of the Year ===
discontinued

- 2024: no award
- 2023: no award
- 2022: Stuart Dunn, Only Us
- 2021: no award
- 2020: Sam Landers (Editor), Tom Maday (Editor), Trope London

=== Illustrated Travel Book of the Year ===
discontinued

- 2024: no award
- 2023: no award
- 2022: Matt Brown, Rhys B. Davies, illustrated by Mike Hall, Atlas of Imagined Places: From Lilliput to Gotham City
- 2021: no award
- 2020: Travis Elborough, Atlas of Vanishing Places: The lost worlds as they were and as they are today

=== Food & Drink Travel Book of the Year ===
discontinued

- 2024: no award
- 2023: no award
- 2022: Yasmin Khan, Ripe Figs: Recipes and Stories from the Eastern Mediterranean
- 2021: no award
- 2020: Eleanor Ford, Fire Islands
- 2019: Caroline Eden, Black Sea: Dispatches and Recipes, Through Darkness and Light
- 2018: Bart van Olphen, Bart's Fish Tales
- 2017: no award
- 2016: Tessa Kiros, Provence to Pondicherry

=== New Travel Writer of the Year ===
discontinued

- 2024: Sinean Callery
- 2023: Emma Willsteed, What Was Left Behind
- 2022: Ruth Cox, Ghar Ghosts
- 2021: Anita King, Hope in Pink Meringue
- 2020: Kirstin Zhang, Closer to Home
- 2019: Celia Dillow, Reflections of Dubai
- 2018: Alan Packer, The Village Sledge Run
- 2017: no award
- 2016: Dom Tulett, The Tiger's Tail

=== Photography & Illustrated Travel Book of the Year ===
discontinued

- 2019: Huw Lewis-Jones, The Writer's Map: An Atlas of Imaginary Lands
- 2018: Londonist Mapped by AA Publishing
- 2017: no award
- 2016: Malachy Tallack & Katie Scott, The Un-Discovered Islands

=== Innovation in Travel Publishing ===
discontinued

- 2016: James Cheshire & Oliver Uberti, Where the Animals Go

=== Travel Memoir of the Year ===
discontinued

- 2020: Pico Iyer, A Beginner's Guide to Japan: Observations and Provocations
- 2019: Guy Stagg, The Crossway

=== Adventure Travel Book of the Year ===
discontinued

- 2020: Lara Prior-Palmer, Rough Magic: Riding the World's Wildest Horse Race
- 2019: Adam Weymouth, Kings of the Yukon: One Summer Paddling Across the Far North
- 2018: Morten Strøksnes, Shark Drunk: The Art of Catching a Large Shark from a Tiny Rubber Dinghy in a Big Ocean
- 2017: no award
- 2016: Levison Wood, Walking the Himalayas

=== Travel Blog of the Year ===
discontinued

- 2019: no award
- 2018: Dave McClane, Man Vs Globe
- 2017: no award
- 2016: Lauren Williams, The Enjoyable Rut
