= Indonesia (disambiguation) =

Indonesia is an island chain country in Southeast Asia.

Indonesia may also refer to:

== Historical ==
- Dutch East Indies (1800–1949)
  - Japanese East Indies (1942–1945) in WWII
- Republic of Indonesia (1949–1950)
- United States of Indonesia (1949–1950)

== Places ==
- Greater Indonesia, an irredentist geopolitical concept
- Indonesian Archipelago, a group of islands in Southeast Asia and Oceania
- Indonesia Hospital, a hospital in Gaza, Palestine

== People ==
- Miss Indonesia pageant winner, may be referred to as "Indonesia"
- Miss Universe Indonesia pageant winner, may be referred to as "Indonesia"
- Ambassador from Indonesia; see List of Indonesian ambassadors

== Sports ==
=== Teams ===
- The national team representing Indonesia; see sports in Indonesia
  - Indonesia XI, occasional teams referred to as in association football
- Indonesia Sports Club (Spanish: Deportivo Indonesia), an association football club in Uruguay
- A1 Team Indonesia, a motor racing team in A1GP

=== Competitions ===
- Indonesia Open
- Indonesian Grand Prix
- Rally of Indonesia
- Tour de Indonesia

== Other uses ==
- Garuda Indonesia, airline whose callsign is INDONESIA
- Indonesia Association (Indonesian: Perhimpoenan Indonesia), a Dutch student federation

== See also ==
- Names of Indonesia
- History of Indonesia
- Indonesia, Etc., a 2014 travel book
- Indonesia Raya
- Indonesian
