= The Wild Places =

The Wild Places may refer to:

- The Wild Places (book), a 2007 book by Robert Macfarlane
- The Wild Places (Dan Fogelberg album)
- The Wild Places (Duncan Browne album)
