= Adam Weymouth =

English travel writer (born 1984)

- Born: 1984 (age 41–42); Salisbury, England
- Occupation: Travel writer
- Notable work: Kings of the Yukon (2018); Lone Wolf (2025)
- Awards: Sunday Times Young Writer of the Year Award (2018); Lonely Planet Adventure Travel Book of the Year (2019); Sherborne Prize for Travel Writing (2026)
- Website: www.adamweymouth.com

Adam Weymouth (born 1984) is an English travel writer and freelance journalist, whose work has been published in such outlets as Granta, The Atlantic and The Observer. He is the author of two critically acclaimed books: Kings of the Yukon (2018) and Lone Wolf (2025). He has received several awards, including the Sunday Times Young Writer of the Year, the Lonely Planet Adventure Travel Book of the Year, the Prix Paul Emile-Victor and the inaugural Sherborne Prize for Travel Writing.

== Biography ==
Adam Weymouth was born in 1984 in Salisbury, England. His articles have appeared in a wide range of publications including Granta, The Observer, and The Atlantic.

Weymouth's 2018 debut book, Kings of the Yukon – an account of the author's epic voyage by canoe down the Yukon River – was shortlisted for the Ondaatje Prize and won the Sunday Times/Peters Fraser + Dunlop Young Writer of the Year Award, as well as the Lonely Planet Adventure Travel Book of the Year in 2019. Reviewed in Canada's National Observer, the book was described as "brilliant", stating: "[Weymouth] writes like Annie Dillard, Bruce Chatwin and Jack London combined: suspenseful and sensitive storytelling and sumptuous descriptions."

His 2025 book Lone Wolf: Walking the Faultlines of Europe was shortlisted for the Baillie Gifford Prize and won the inaugural Sherborne Prize for Travel Writing, presented by chair of the judges Colin Thubron on 12 April 2026.

In collaboration with Lacuna Magazine, Weymouth hosts the Spoken Earth podcast series, where he interviews environmental thinkers, academics and activists.

== Bibliography ==
- Kings of the Yukon, 2018
- Lone Wolf, 2025
