= Sunn O))) (album) =

- Front cover for the North American release

Studio album by Sunn O)))
- Released: April 3, 2026
- Recorded: January 2025
- Studio: Bear Creek (Woodinville)
- Length: 79:35
- Label: Sub Pop
- Producers: Brad Wood; Greg Anderson; Stephen O'Malley

Sunn O))) chronology
Pyroclasts (2019)	Sunn O))) (2026)

Singles from Sunn O)))
- 1. "Glory Black" Released: January 13, 2026; 2. "Butch's Guns" Released: February 19, 2026

Sunn O))) is the tenth studio album by American drone metal band Sunn O))). It was released via Sub Pop Records on April 3, 2026, and is the band's full-length debut with the label.

== Background and recording ==
Sunn O)))—Greg Anderson and Stephen O'Malley—have released most of their prior material via Anderson's Southern Lord Records. They collaborated with Sub Pop Records for the two-track single "Evil Chuck" / "Ron G. Warrior" in 2023 as part of the Sub Pop Singles Club series. The band officially signed with the label in October 2025 and released the three-track single "Eternity Pillars" / "Raise the Chalice" / "Reverential"; the recordings were made earlier that year with producer Brad Wood at two American studios: Sea Grass (Los Angeles, California) and Bear Creek (Woodinville, Washington). Andserson and Wood had previously collaborated.

Sunn O))) was inspired by, among other things, Is a River Alive? (2025) by Robert Macfarlane, who provided the album's liner notes. O'Malley became a fan of Macfarlane after a friend recommended Mountains of the Mind (2003); O'Malley spoke about why he felt Macfarlane was a good fit for the band: "He expresses walking as a spiritual experience, which it is for me too. [...] In his liner notes for the new album, he writes about standing waves existing simultaneously with flowing water. There's something about the way the sound energy works with our music that I see as liquid, but not liquid, and it is a great metaphor for that." The album was recorded by the band and Wood at Bear Creek in January 2025. The studio (a converted barn) and its surrounding rural environment inspired the music. O'Malley said: "We could go hiking and be out in the woods, spend time outdoors. That became a big part of it." They later mixed the album at Wood's studio in Southern California.

The album incorporates ambient sounds recorded outside the studio, such as an active stump grinder and the water of a nearby creek. Re-amping was used extensively during the recording process. Speaking about the technique, Wood said: "We opened up these giant doors and the doors to the kitchen leading out into the outside on the left and right side of the studio and just blasted their music out, and then set up microphones a couple hundred yards away from each other—like the world's largest stereo array of room mikes." To obtain a massive guitar sound, in contrast with what journalist Hank Shteamer describes as the typical process of recording guitars (one microphone for each four-speaker cabinet), Wood used a microphone for each speaker across three cabinets; he estimated that every track on the album used at least 130 audio tracks of guitar. Anderson estimated the upper limit to be 180. The close-knit sessions had no musical collaborators; the band eschewed its usual method of inviting guest musicians onto its albums, and as such, Sunn O))) is the band's first album where only the duo perform, with each playing bass, guitar, piano, and synthesizer.

O'Malley described it as "a very documentary record in terms of the sound detail captured." Elaborating on their routines during the sessions, Anderson said: "It became this sort of ritual or routine of waking up in the morning, having a coffee together, and then going out and exploring and hiking." The duo, who both have homes in Southern California, considered leaving Bear Creek and returning to California after two days when the general area of their homes (including Anderson's family) were evacuated due to the Californian wildfires at the time; although none of his loved ones or his home were ultimately harmed, Anderson said that the incident "really put life in perspective. We decided to really enjoy it, to squeeze every single drop out of the recording session that we possibly could. [...] There's an intensity to the music, and that's where it comes from."

== Marketing ==
The album was announced with a Sub Pop press release on January 13, 2026, coinciding with the lead single "Glory Black". The album's front and back covers, which are swapped on the European edition, each feature a painting by American abstract painter Mark Rothko. The second single, "Butch's Guns", was released on February 19, 2026. To support the album, the band played a thirty-three-concert tour of Europe and North America from March 30, 2026, to July 7, 2026. In mid-July, after the tour's end, it was announced that the band would be going on another tour in support of the album: twenty-five North American concerts from October 2, 2026, to November 1, 2026.

== Critical reception ==
Professional ratings
Aggregate scores
Source	Rating
Album of the Year	79/100
Any Decent Music	7.7/10
Metacritic	85/100
Review scores
Source	Rating
AllMusic	4/5 stars
Clash	8/10
The Guardian	4/5 stars
Kerrang!	4/5
The Line of Best Fit	8/10
Mojo	4/5 stars
MusicOMH	4.5/5 stars
Paste	B
Pitchfork	8.0/10
Record Collector	4/5 stars

On Album of the Year, the album has an average score of 79 out of 100 from twenty critic scores. Any Decent Music gave it a weighted average score of 7.7 out of 10 from sixteen critic scores. According to Metacritic, it received "universal acclaim" based on a weighted average score of 85 out of 100 from twenty critic scores.

== Track listing ==
All tracks are written by Greg Anderson and Stephen O'Malley.

No.	Title	Length
1.	"XXANN"	18:21
2.	"Does Anyone Hear Like Venom?"	7:32
3.	"Butch's Guns"	14:12
4.	"Mindrolling"	18:12
5.	"Everett Moses"	10:53
6.	"Glory Black"	10:25
Total length:		79:35

== Personnel ==
These credits have been adapted from a Sub Pop press release, a New York Times interview, and music streaming services.

=== Sunn O))) ===
- Greg Anderson – bass, guitar, piano, synthesizer, production, mixing
- Stephen O'Malley – bass, guitar, piano, synthesizer, production, mixing

=== Other ===
- Brad Wood – recording, production, mixing
- Dylan Wall – recording assistance
- Matt Colton – mastering
- Mark Rothko – front and back cover art (posthumous)
- Robert Macfarlane – liner notes
- Élodie Lesourd – illustrations

== Charts ==
Chart performance for Sunn O)))
Chart (2026)	Peak position
Australian Albums (ARIA)	75
Austrian Albums (Ö3 Austria)	60
Belgian Albums (Ultratop Flanders)	30
Belgian Albums (Ultratop Wallonia)	170
Croatian International Albums (HDU)	1
French Physical Albums (SNEP)	105
French Rock & Metal Albums (SNEP)	26
German Albums (Offizielle Top 100)	36
German Rock & Metal Albums (Offizielle Top 100)	9
Swedish Physical Albums (Sverigetopplistan)	8
Scottish Albums (Official Charts)	10
Swiss Albums (Schweizer Hitparade)	60
UK Albums Sales (OCC)	11
UK Independent Albums (Official Charts)	5
UK Rock & Metal Albums (Official Charts)	2
US Top Album Sales (Billboard)	29
