= Anser djuktaiensis =

Anser djuktaiensis Temporal range: late Pleistocene-Holocene

Scientific classification
- Kingdom: Animalia
- Phylum: Chordata
- Class: Aves
- Order: Anseriformes
- Family: Anatidae
- Genus: Anser
- Species: †A. djuktaiensis

Binomial name
- †Anser djuktaiensis Zelenkov & Kurochkin, 2014

Extinct species of bird

Anser djuktaiensis or Dyuktai goose is an extinct goose, similar to but larger than the extant greylag goose, the remains of which have been found in the Dyuktai Cave near the Dyuktai River in Yakutia, Russia. The cave is dated from Upper Pleistocene to possibly Holocene in age.
