= House of Stone (Tshuma novel) =

House of Stone is a 2018 novel by Zimbabwean writer Novuyo Rosa Tshuma. It was her first novel. The book follows a family in Bulawayo and moves through the history of Rhodesia and independent Zimbabwe, including the Gukurahundi killings.

== Reception ==
Helon Habila reviewed House of Stone for The Guardian. He praised the novel, while noting that parts of the story were difficult to follow. Dinaw Mengestu reviewed the novel for The New York Times. He described it as ambitious and praised Tshuma's handling of Zimbabwe's past. Kirkus Reviews called the novel multilayered and surprising.

== Awards ==
House of Stone won the 2019 Edward Stanford Travel Writing Award for Fiction with a Sense of Place. It also won the 2019 Bulawayo Arts Award for Outstanding Fiction.
