= Yuri Mochanov =

Russian archaeologist (1934–2020)

- Born: 8 November 1934; Leningrad, Russian SFSR
- Died: 20 October 2020 (aged 85); Kyiv, Ukraine
- Occupation: Archaeologist

Yuri Mochanov (8 November 1934 – 20 October 2020) was a Russian archaeologist.

== Biography ==
Mochanov graduated from Leningrad State University in 1957 with a degree in history. He served as Deputy Director for Science at the Institute for Humanitarian Research. He discovered Upper Paleolithic Dyuktai Culture, stone tools in Diring Yuriaj in Siberia, and 1,000 different archaeological sites. In his book In Siberia, author Colin Thubron recounted his meetings with Mochanov.
