= Matthew Parker (author) =

English author (born 1970)

- Born: 1970 (age 55–56); El Salvador
- Education: Balliol College, Oxford University
- Occupation: Author
- Children: 3
- Writing career
- Language: English
- Genre: Historical non-fiction
- Notable works: Monte Cassino; Panama Fever; The Sugar Barons
- Website: Matthew Parker

Matthew Parker (born 1970) is an English author of historical non-fiction books whose work has covered topics including European colonialism, World War II, and the construction of the Panama Canal.

== Early life and education ==
Parker was born in El Salvador to British parents and spent parts of his childhood in Great Britain, Norway and Barbados. He was educated at Yardley Court, Tonbridge School and Balliol College, Oxford, where he earned a degree in English.

== Writing career ==
Parker's first two books were about World War II. The Battle of Britain, July–October 1940: An Oral History of Britain's Finest Hour was published in 2000, and Monte Cassino: The Story of the Hardest-Fought Battle in World War II came out in 2003. Of the latter, Publishers Weekly said: "Parker details, with the aid of hundreds of survivor interviews and war diaries, the Allied siege of the monastery at Monte Cassino, a mountainous fiefdom massively fortified....With command and ground-level detail that buffs will savor, Parker goes over what seems like every inch of the multinational force's campaign."

His book Panama Fever: The Epic Story of One of the Greatest Human Achievements of All Time-- the Building of the Panama Canal (retitled Hell's Gorge: The Battle to Build the Panama Canal for the UK paperback edition) came out in 2007. Allan Massie reviewed it for The Telegraph: "His narrative is compelling, his ability to weave a pattern from the topics he has to cover quite remarkable...There isn't a dull page, and if this book isn't a candidate for all the non-fiction prizes going, I shall be disappointed."

In 2011, he published The Sugar Barons: Family, Corruption, Empire and War in the West Indies. It was named a Book of the Year by The Economist and John Gimlette of The Spectator called it "compelling, wonderful history. The Sugar Barons is an exemplary book; history as it should be written."

Parker next turned to biography, with an account of the life of James Bond author Ian Fleming during his years living in Jamaica, titled Goldeneye: Where Bond Was Born: Ian Fleming's Jamaica (2014). It was nominated for an Edgar Award in 2016.

In 2015, his first look at a period of history before the modern era was published. Willoughbyland: England's Lost Colony is the story of Lord Willoughby's short-lived 17th-century colony in what is now Suriname. John Gimlette reviewed it for The Spectator: "A miniature masterpiece...this is a truly extraordinary tale and, in Parker's hands, it's beautifully told. With great wit and scholarship he reveals — just for a moment — a cruel and curious world, before it vanishes again beneath the trees."

== Personal life ==
Parker lives in London with his wife and three children.

He is a bowler on the Authors XI amateur cricket team, which is composed of British writers, and he contributed a chapter to the team's book about their first season playing together, The Authors XI: A Season of English Cricket from Hackney to Hambledon (Bloomsbury, 2013).

== Books ==
- The Battle of Britain, July–October 1940: An Oral History of Britain's Finest Hour (London: Headline Book Publishing, 2000), ISBN 978-0747234500
- Monte Cassino: The Story of the Hardest-Fought Battle in World War II (London: Headline Book Publishing, 2003; Doubleday Books, 2004), ISBN 978-0385509855
- Panama Fever: The Epic Story of One of the Greatest Human Achievements of All Time-- the Building of the Panama Canal (Doubleday Books, 2007), ISBN 978-0385515344
- The Sugar Barons: Family, Corruption, Empire and War in the West Indies (Hutchinson, 2011), ISBN 978-0091925833
- Goldeneye: Where Bond Was Born-- Ian Fleming's Jamaica (Pegasus Books, 2014), ISBN 978-1605986869
- Willoughbyland: England's Lost Colony (Hutchinson, 2015), ISBN 978-0091954093
- One Fine Day: Britain's Empire on the Brink (Abacus, 2023), ISBN 978-1408708583
