= Novuyo Tshuma =

Zimbabwe-born writer and professor of creative writing (born 1988

- Born: Novuyo Rosa Tshuma; 28 January 1988 (age 38); Bulawayo, Zimbabwe
- Occupations: Writer; author
- Notable work: House of Stone (2018)
- Website: novuyotshuma.com

Novuyo Rosa Tshuma (born 28 January 1988) is a Zimbabwe-born writer and professor of creative writing. She is the author of Shadows, a novella, and House of Stone, a novel.

== Biography ==
Tshuma was born and grew up in Bulawayo, Zimbabwe. She completed her high-school education at Girls' College, Bulawayo, where she studied mathematics, physics, chemistry and French for her A Levels. She is an alumna of the University of the Witwatersrand, where she studied Economics and Finance. In 2009, her short story You in Paradise won the Intwasa Short Story Competition (now the Yvonne Vera Award) for short fiction. Tshuma's short stories have been featured in various anthologies, which include The Bed Book of Short Stories (Modjaji Books, 2010); A Life In Full and Other Stories: Caine Prize Anthology 2010 (New Internationalist, 2010) and Where to Now? Short Stories from Zimbabwe (amaBooks, 2011). More recently, her short fiction and non-fiction has been featured in McSweeney's, Ploughshares, The Displaced anthology edited by the Pulitzer Prize-winning author Viet Thanh Nguyen, and New Daughters of Africa (2019), edited by Margaret Busby. In 2013, she shot to recognition following the release of her collection Shadows, which was published by Kwela Books. Shadows was nominated at the 2014 Etisalat Prize for Literature and also won the Herman Charles Bosman Prize.

In 2014, Tshuma was listed as part of Africa39, a collaborative project by Hay Festival and Rainbow Book Club recognising 39 writers from Africa under the age of 40. She received the Rockefeller Foundation's Bellagio Center Literary Arts Residency Award for her work in 2017. Tshuma earned her MFA in creative writing from the Iowa Writers' Workshop and her PhD in literature and creative writing from the University of Houston. She has taught graduate fiction at the Iowa Writers’ Workshop and serves on the Writing, Literature and Publishing Faculty at Emerson College as an assistant professor of fiction.

Tshuma's novel, House of Stone, was longlisted for the 2019 Rathbones Folio Prize and shortlisted for the 2019 Orwell Prize for Political Fiction, the 2020 Balcones Fiction Prize and the 2019 Dylan Thomas Prize. House of Stone won a 2019 Edward Stanford Travel Writing Award in the "Fiction with a sense of place" category and was awarded the 2019 Bulawayo Arts Award for Outstanding Fiction.

== Awards ==
- 2009: Yvonne Vera Short Story Award
- 2014: Herman Charles Bosman Prize, Winner
- 2014: Etisalat Prize for Literature, Longlist
- 2017: Rockefeller Foundation Bellagio Arts and Literary Arts Residency
- 2019: Edward Stanford Prize for Fiction with a Sense of Place, Winner
- 2019: Bulawayo Arts Award for Outstanding Fiction, Winner
- 2019: Orwell Prize for Political Fiction, Shortlist
- 2019: Dylan Thomas Prize, Shortlist
- 2019: Rathbones Folio Prize, Longlist
- 2020 Lannan Foundation Literary Fellowship
- 2020: Balcones Fiction Prize, Shortlist

== Selected works ==
- Shadows (2013)
- House of Stone (2018), London Atlantic Books
