= Dyuktai Cave =

Archaeological site in Russia

Coordinates: 59.594133°N 132.6068°E

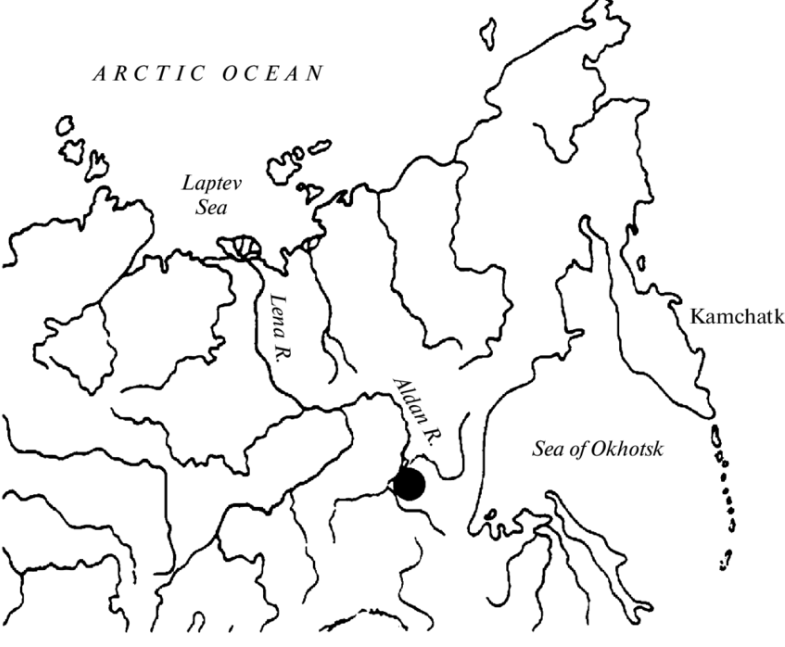
Dyuktai Cave, located along the Dyuktai River in the Aldan River drainage, geographic wise.

Dyuktai Cave (also called Diuktai, D'uktai, Divktai, or Duktai in Russian) is a site in Russia's Yakutia Region (or the Sakha Republic) along the Dyuktai River in the Aldan River drainage. Discovered by Yuri Mochanov in 1967, who excavated in the same year, it is located at 59.288 latitude and 132.607 longitude, a total of 317 square meters (3,412 square feet) has been excavated. It is renowned for its rich archaeological deposits dating back to the Upper Paleolithic period, particularly the Last Glacial Maximum, around 30,000 to 10,000 years ago. The cave has yielded significant findings, including stone tools, bone artifacts, and evidence of early human occupation. The archaeological site is part of the Dyuktai Complex; the cave is among the youngest of the Dyuktai culture sites and was believed to be part of the Late Terminal Siberian Upper Paleolithic. Overall, the site was found to be scattered with stone tools assemblies and was thought to be a temporary living site and was part of the evidence that suggests the linkage between Northeast Asia and North America through the similarity of the tool-making technique.

== Excavation ==
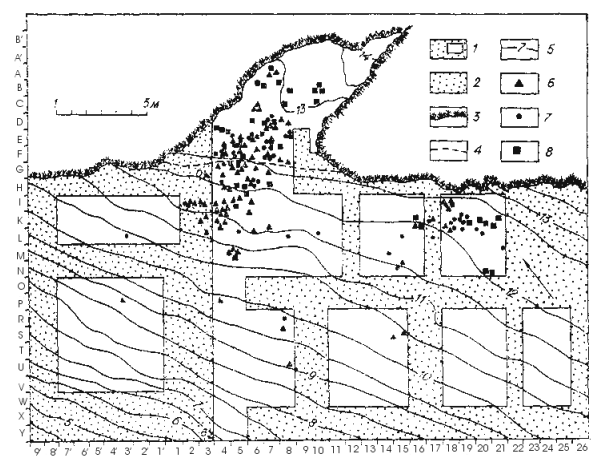
Dyuktai Cave Excavation Plan provided by Mochanov. Here, layer 7, 8, and 9 are Horizontal A (VIIa and upper VIII), Horizontal B (VIIb and lower unit of stratum VIII), and Horizontal C (stratum VIIc and stratum IX).

Yuri A. Mochanov, a Russian archeologist who specializes in the archeology of the Paleolithic and the early stages of human occupation in northeast Asia, found the site in September 1967, and excavated in the same year, which he detailed in his paper, The Earliest Stages of Settlement by People of Northeast Asia, translated into English by Richard L. Bland, where he excavate other sites of which he believed is the Late Pleistocene of Northeast Asia (35000-10500 cal BP).

The form of the cave is subtriangular in plan. Its area amounts to about 60 m^{2}. The length of the cave in an east-west line is 12.5 m. The greatest width of the cave, at its mouth (the entrance), is 10.5 m. It narrows to 5 m approximately in the center. The height of the cave at the entrance is 2.7 m from the present ground surface to the ceiling. It gradually drops In-depth (from the back), reaching 1 to 1.2 m in the center. The drop of the cave is connected with the sloping position of its modern floor relative to a horizontal line, for which the river bank was accepted. The angle of drop of the floor from the source of the cave to its mouth (along the east-west line) is 7 to 8°. In addition, the floor of the cave falls at an angle of 5 to 6° from the south side to the north. The roof (ceiling) of the cave relative to the river bank is situated almost horizontally. The floor's height at the cave's mouth area is 12.5 m from the mean water level of the Dyuktai and Aldan Rivers. In the center of the cave, the floor rises to 13 m, and at the back, it reaches 14.5 m.

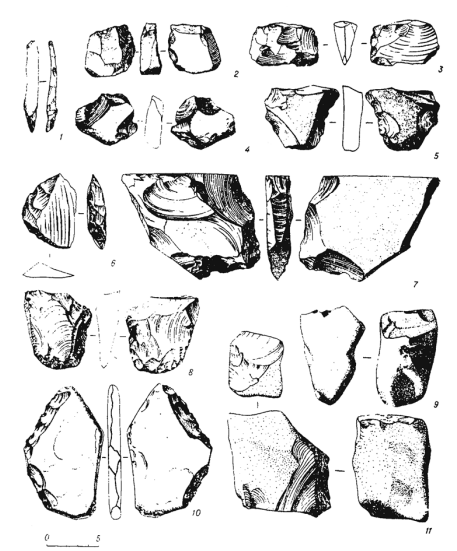
Sample of stone assembly found in Strata VIIa.

Nine stratigraphic units are assigned to the cave deposits, of which strata 7, 8, and 9 are associated with the Dyuktai Complex. In the portion regarding the excavation of the Dyuktai Cave, he did a total recording of the findings at the site, which included details such as the shapes of the objects, the marks left, the techniques to make the tools, etc.

Mochanov detailed the following excavation findings of different layers, starting at Layer 7, which he divided into 4 parts: 7a, 7b, and 7c:

- In 7a, 1693 stone artifacts, 8 bone objects, and 1631 animal bones were found.
- In 7b,1604 stone objects and 627 animal bones were found. This time, specimens of black, gray, and banded grayish-black flint are predominant among the flakes. The knife-like blades found on this stratum can be divided based on their materials.
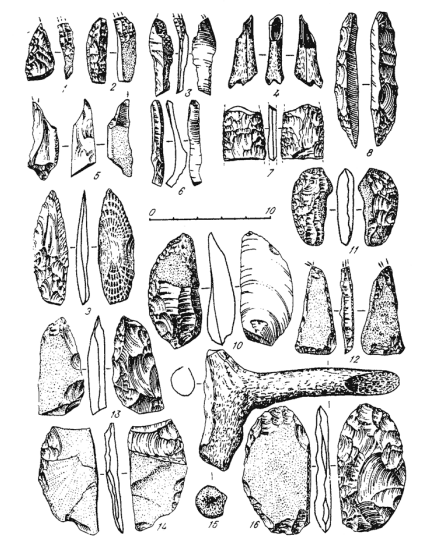
  Dyuktai Cave, Sample of stone and bone assembly from Strata VIIa, VIIb, and VIII.
- In 7c, 835 stone objects and 2570 animal bones were found.

In Strata 8, 2967 stone objects, 21 bone objects, and 3771 animal bones were found.

In Strata 9, 688 stone objects, 4 bone objects, and 1346 animal bones were found.

=== Conclusion ===
Mochanov came to the conclusions through the total recording of this site as well as techniques such as radiocarbon dating revealed that the settlement of the cave and cave apron by Dyuktai people occurred during a period of accumulation of the alluvial floodplain facies of the second Aldan floodplain terrace. It was later confirmed that the accumulation of the floodplain alluvium of Terrace II began around 23,000 to 22,000 years ago and ended 13,000 to 12,000 years ago. However, the precise dating of the site is still unknown as the range is broad.

Most stone objects, bone objects, and animal bones found are relatively similar across the different layers, such as the types of cores, the combination of large flint slabs and small knife-like blades, and the techniques performed on the tools.

The greatest significance of the work at this site was that it distinguished particular stone tools in Northeast Asia. The artifacts discovered distinguished a special Paleolithic culture, receiving the name "Dyuktai" by Mochanov. It was also Mochanov's excavation of other Dyuktai Culture that proposed a relationship between the Dyuktai Culture and the Paleo-Indian and/or Paleo-Arctic tradition of North America. He proposed that there must be significant relationship between the two cultural groups.

== Chronology ==
Before the excavation of the Dyuktai Cave, there had been speculations about the connection between Siberian Dyuktai sites and North America, with one major evidence being how similar the stone tools appeared. J. Flenniken first identified pressure flaking to produce microblades in Siberia in 1986 and has been suggested for most of the Paleolithic microblade material from northeast Asia and North America.

Vitalij Epifanovič Laričev, a Russian anthropologist, argued that has argued that despite the variety, the similarity of artifact assemblage among the Dyuktai sites suggest the groups shared intra-regional traditions. Yan Axel Gómez Coutouly, an archaeologist from the French National Centre for Scientific Research, suggested the following chronology:

- Early (35,000-23000 RCYBP): Ezhantsy, Ust'Mil' II, Ikhine II sites. Tools include wedge-shaped subprismatic and tortoise cores, burins, scrapers, perforators, and bifaces.
- Middle (18,000-17,000 RCYBP): Nizhne and Verkhne-Troitskaya sites. Bifacially flaked points; dart points, pendants from pebbles, retouched blades and flakes, worked bone and ivory.
- Late (14,000-12,000 RCYBP): Dyuktai cave, Tumulur, maybe Berelekh, Avdeikha, and Kukhtai III, Ushki Lakes, and Maiorych. Bifacially flaked stemmed points, leaf-shaped points and fragments, bifacial knives, scrapers and sandstone abraders; stone pendants and beads of various types.

He later conducted a study in which he examined and attempted to identify the pressure flaking modes of the Dyuktai Cave, to which he also agreed with Vitalij Epifanovič Laričev and argued that the site was rather a temporary site due to the messy states the artifacts were found, agreed by others as well.
