= Indonesian =

Indonesian is anything of, from, or related to Indonesia, an archipelagic country in Southeast Asia. It may refer to:

- Indonesians, citizens of Indonesia
  - Indonesian nationality law, laws which determine who is, or is eligible to be, a national of Indonesia (WNI)
  - Native Indonesians, diverse groups of local inhabitants of the archipelago
  - Indonesian women, overview of women's history and contemporary situations
- Indonesian language (Indonesian: bahasa Indonesia), the official language of Indonesia
  - Indonesian languages, overview of some of the 700 languages spoken in Indonesia
  - Indonesian names, customs reflecting the multicultural and polyglot nature of Indonesia
- Indonesian culture, a complex of indigenous customs and foreign influences
  - Indonesian art, various artistic expressions and artworks in the archipelago
  - Indonesian cinema, a struggling and developing industry
  - Indonesian literature, literature from Indonesia and Southeast Asia with shared language roots
  - Indonesian music, hundreds of forms of traditional and contemporary music
  - Indonesian philosophy, a tradition of abstract speculation by Indonesians
  - Indonesian cuisine, regional and national styles of cooking
- Indonesian geography, an overview of the physical environment of Indonesia
- Indonesian history, fundamentally shaped by trade
- Indonesian wildlife, fauna and ecosystems of Indonesia

== See also ==
- List of islands of Indonesia, nearly 9,000 named islands
- List of Indonesians, notable Indonesian people
- Demographics of Indonesia, characteristics of the population
- Indonesia (disambiguation)
