= Underland (book) =

Book by Robert Macfarlane

Underland: A Deep Time Journey
- First edition (UK)
- Author: Robert Macfarlane
- Audio read by: Matthew Waterson
- Cover artist: Stanley Donwood
- Language: English
- Subject: Geology; Underground areas; Civilization, Subterranean; Voyages and travels
- Published: 2 May 2019 (UK: Hamish Hamilton); 4 June 2019 (US: W. W. Norton & Company; audiobook: HighBridge Audio)
- Publication place: England
- Media type: Print; digital; audiobook
- Pages: 496
- Awards: National Outdoor Book Award for Natural History Literature (2019); The Wainwright Prize for UK Nature Writing (2019); Stanford Dolman Travel Book of the Year (2020); American Library Association Notable Book (2020)
- ISBN: 978-0-393-24214-0 Hardcover
- OCLC: 1054001747
- Dewey Decimal: 551.447
- LC Class: GN755
- Preceded by: The Old Ways: A Journey on Foot
- Website: www.underlandbook.com
- All identifiers refer to the Norton international edition, published in June 2019, unless otherwise noted

Underland: A Deep Time Journey is a book by Robert Macfarlane and the sequel to The Old Ways: A Journey on Foot. Initially published in English on 2 May 2019 by Hamish Hamilton in the UK and on 4 June 2019 by W. W. Norton & Company in the US, the book has been translated into over a dozen languages. An audiobook, read by Matthew Waterson, was also released in June 2019 by HighBridge Audio.

The book is a descriptive journey by the author of different subterranean landscapes that he explores, including caving in the Mendip Hills, the Catacombs of Paris, the Karst Plateau, an underground laboratory for detecting evidence of dark matter, and descending into a glacier's moulin among other explorations. These underground spaces represent "burial and unburial and deep time." Through these underground journeys the book sheds light on the impacts and consequences of human actions within the Anthropocene geological epoch.

== Reception ==
The book has received awards and honours, including being a Sunday Times, New York Times, and Los Angeles Times bestseller. It is a 2020 American Library Association Notable Book, and has won The 2019 National Outdoor Book Award for Natural History Literature, The 2019 Wainwright Prize for UK Nature Writing, and was named the 2020 Stanford Dolman Travel Book of the Year at the Edward Stanford Travel Writing Awards.

== Film adaptation ==
A feature-length documentary film based on the book, produced by Darren Aronofsky and narrated by Sandra Hüller premiered at the Tribeca Film Festival in June 2025.
