= Douglas Rogers (writer) =

Zimbabwean writer

- Born: 11 November 1968 (age 57); Umtali, Rhodesia (now called Mutare, Zimbabwe)
- Occupations: Journalist, travel writer, memoirist
- Notable credit: Author of The Last Resort (2009)
- Spouse: Grace Cutler

Douglas Rogers (born 11 November 1968) is a Zimbabwean journalist, travel writer, and memoirist.

== Biography ==
Rogers was born and raised in Umtali, Rhodesia to Lyn, a lawyer, and Rosalind, a drama teacher. He grew up on heavily fortified chicken and grape farms during the Rhodesian Bush War, with his three sisters and parents. He survived a car crash when he was 11 years old; the car had sped off a cliff in the Nyanga mountains, and a female passenger was killed.

He attended Chancellor Junior School and Mutare Boys High, and later boarded at Prince Edward School in Harare. After graduating, with a journalism degree, from Rhodes University in South Africa, he was a city reporter for a Johannesburg newspaper, and completed freelance editing assignments for Radio 702 and other media outlets. After moving to London in 1994, he published several feature pieces in newspapers such as The Independent. His first travel piece was published by the Sunday Telegraph in 1997. He has also written extensively for The Daily Telegraph, The Guardian, and Travel + Leisure.

In 2003, Rogers moved to the United States, on a media visa sponsored by fellow Zimbabwean and Telegraph travel editor, Graham Boynton. Rogers currently teaches travel writing at the Gotham Writers Workshop.

== Personal life ==
Rogers currently lives in Brooklyn, New York, with his wife Grace Cutler, a television news producer from New Jersey, and their children.

=== Overview ===
In 2009, Rogers published a part-memoir, part-travelogue, The Last Resort, concerning his parents' struggle to stay afloat in modern-day Zimbabwe, coping with inflation, and warding off land invasions.

He also describes meeting several of the employees, and short- and long-term tenants who stayed in his parents' holiday cottages before and after the tourism industry broke down. The residents include a mercenary named Mac, evicted white farmers, prostitutes and a brothel manager, a descendant of Andries Pretorius, a former captain of the Rhodesian rugby team who is related to F. W. de Klerk, diamond dealers, as well as a nurse who assisted in the theatre as Christiaan Barnard performed the world's first ever heart transplantation. Another resident is the brother of Abel Muzorewa, who briefly was Prime Minister of Zimbabwe Rhodesia.

=== Reception ===
The Sunday Times praised the book as it "captures the rich humanity – the friendship, bravery, stoicism and unfailing humour – of the millions of black and white Zimbabweans." The reviewer continued to describe the book as "utterly engrossing; a vivid chronicle of the disintegration of a post-colonial nation, and the rebirth of a multiethnic African society." The Daily Telegraph reviewer felt the memoir stands apart from its counterparts: "What distinguishes Douglas Rogers's book from others is that there is a genuine narrative thread to his story, the characters are interesting and well observed, and the author's humanity and integrity is consistently on display."

In 2010, the book won the British Guild of Travel Writers award for Best Narrative Travel Book and was nominated for the 2011 Dolman Best Travel Book Award.

== See also ==
- Land reform in Zimbabwe
- Whites in Zimbabwe
