= Pyroclasts (album) =

2019 instrumental album by Sunn O)))

Studio album by Sunn O)))
- Released: October 25, 2019
- Recorded: July 2018
- Studio: Electrical Audio (Chicago, Illinois)
- Genre: Drone metal
- Length: 43:56
- Label: Southern Lord (SUNN333)
- Producer: Greg Anderson, Stephen O'Malley

Sunn O))) chronology
Life Metal (2019)	Pyroclasts (2019)	Sunn O))) (2026)

Pyroclasts is the ninth studio album by American drone metal band Sunn O))). The album was released through Southern Lord Records on October 25, 2019. Pyroclasts was recorded and mixed by Steve Albini (Nirvana, Neurosis, Godspeed You! Black Emperor) entirely using analog tape. In addition to Greg Anderson and Stephen O'Malley, the album features collaborators Tos Nieuwenhuizen, Tim Midyett and Hildur Guðnadóttir.

Pyroclasts was written and recorded alongside what has been described as a "sister album" or a "fraternal twin" album titled Life Metal that was released six months earlier on April 26, 2019. Sunn O))) plus additional collaborators live recorded a new 11-minute improvised drone session at the start or end of each day during the recording of Life Metal. Pyroclasts is a collection of four of those tracks. The title refers to volcanic airborne pyroclastic rock.

== Critical reception ==
Professional ratings
Aggregate scores
Source	Rating
AnyDecentMusic?	7.4/10
Metacritic	76/100
Review scores
Source	Rating
AllMusic	3.5/5 stars
Classic Rock	3/10
Consequence of Sound	B
The Line of Best Fit	8/10
Mojo	3/5 stars
MusicOMH	4/5 stars
Pitchfork	8.0/10
PopMatters	8/10
Uncut	8/10
Under the Radar	8/10

Upon its release, Pyroclasts received positive reviews from contemporary music critics. At Metacritic, which assigns a normalized rating out of 100 to reviews from mainstream publications, Pyroclasts received an average score of 76, based on 13 reviews, indicating "generally favorable reviews". In the review for AllMusic, Thom Jurek wrote that "The forward evolution of Life Metal has been balanced and extended into a mercurial spirit through formless, receptive interaction on Pyroclasts."

Jason Anderson of Uncut praised the album, writing that "The results may comprise the most finely distilled example of Stephen O'Malley and Greg Anderson's deconstruction of heavy metal riffage, with each of these tracks demonstrating the infinite varieties of fuzz and rumble that exist within a single mighty note."

Classic Rock gave the album a 3/10 score, writing, "Four 11-minute 'improvised modal drones' recorded by Steve Albini during the Life Metal sessions for which we're supposed to be grateful. This is why punk happened. Get a grip."

== Track listing ==
All tracks are written by Stephen O'Malley and Greg Anderson

No.	Title	Length
1.	"Frost (C)"	10:55
2.	"Kingdoms (G)"	11:04
3.	"Ampliphædies (E)"	11:03
4.	"Ascension (A)"	10:54
Total length:		43:56

== Personnel ==
Pyroclasts personnel adapted from LP liner notes.

Sunn O)))

- Greg Anderson – electric guitar
- Stephen O'Malley – electric guitar, electric bass guitar

Additional musicians

- Hildur Guðnadóttir – electric cello, haldorophone
- Tim Midyett – electric baritone guitar
- Tos Nieuwenhuizen – Moog Rogue synthesizer

Production

- Steve Albini – recording, mixing (at Electrical Audio in July 2018)
- Greg Anderson – production
- Matt Colton – mastering (at Metropolis, London in July 2019)
- Stephen O'Malley – production

Artwork and design

- Samantha Keely Smith – paintings
