= Nicholas Jubber =

British travel writer

Nicholas Jubber (born 1977) is a British travel writer. He was educated at Downside School and Oxford University. After obtaining a degree in English, he taught in Jerusalem. He has travelled throughout South America, Europe, the Middle East and East Africa. He has worked as a journalist and is also a produced playwright; one of his plays was staged at the Edinburgh Festival.

He has written five books:

- The Prester Quest (2005) (winner of the Dolman Prize)
- Drinking Arak Off An Ayatollah’s Beard: A Journey Through the Inside-Out Worlds of Iran and Afghanistan (2010) (nominated for the Dolman Prize)
- The Timbuktu School for Nomads: Across the Sahara in the Shadow of Jihad (2016)
- Epic Continent: Adventures in the Great Stories of Europe (2019) (nominated for the Dolman Prize)
- The Fairy Tellers: A Journey into the Secret History of Fairy Tales (2022)
