= Alice Morrison =

British TV host and adventurer

Alice Morrison FRSGS
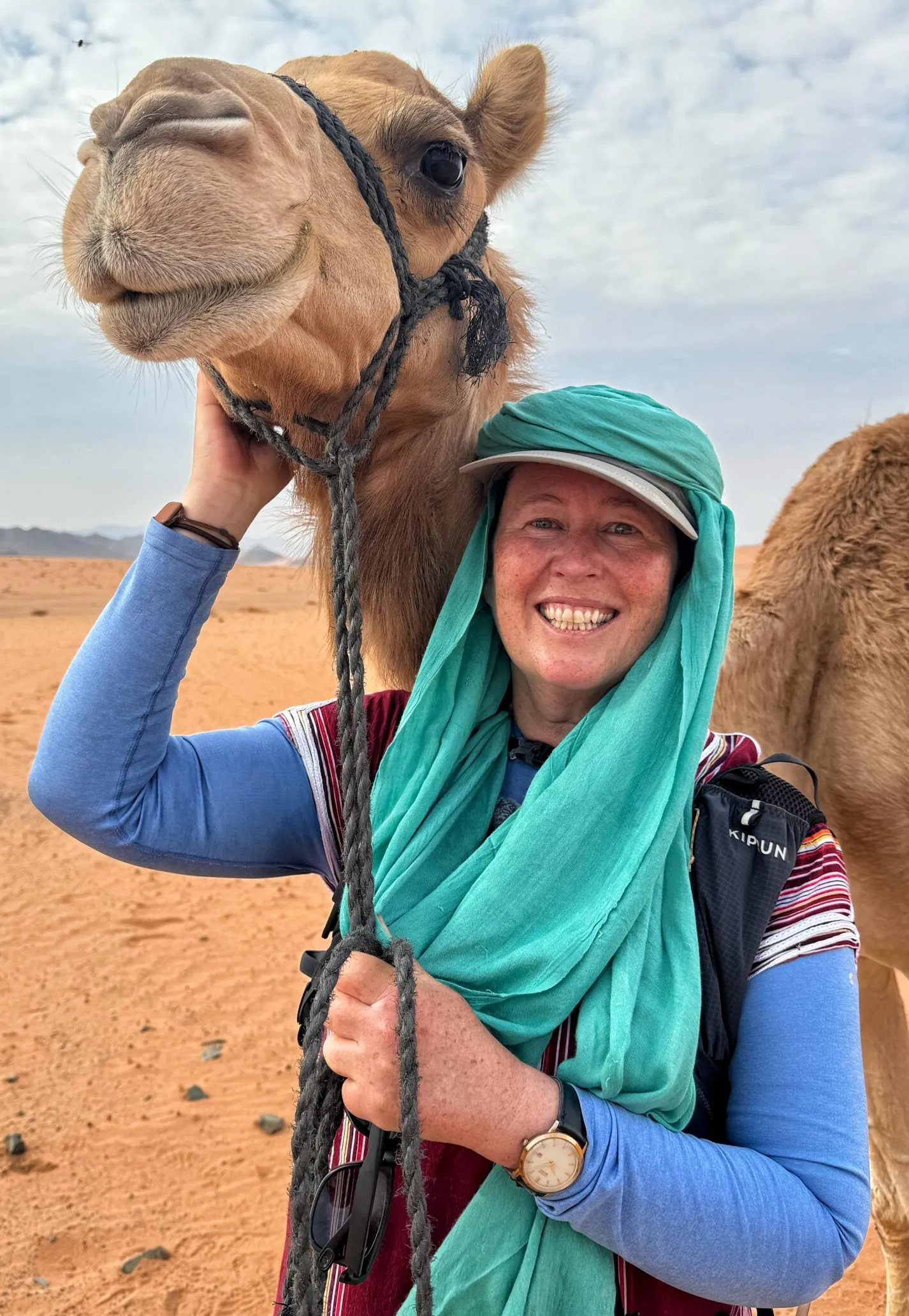
- Alice Morrison during her foot crossing of Saudi Arabia in 2025.
- Born: 1963 (age 62–63); Edinburgh, Scotland
- Occupations: Adventurer; explorer; television presenter; journalist
- Website: alicemorrison.co.uk

Alice Morrison FRSGS (born 1963) is a Scottish adventurer and explorer active in the Arab world. She also presents television series about the history and culture of this region, and about her own expeditions. Her book Walking with Nomads was shortlisted for the 2023 Edward Stanford Travel Book of the Year.

== Early life ==
Morrison was born in 1963 in Edinburgh, but grew up in Africa. She studied Turkish and Arabic at Edinburgh University, and speaks Arabic and French. She worked in journalism as a BBC editor and a CEO of Vision+Media, a British quango for creative media.

== Expeditions, television, and writing ==
=== Morocco journeys (2017–2020) ===
Morrison moved to Morocco in 2014. Based there, in 2017, she worked as presenter for the BBC documentary series Morocco to Timbuktu: An Arabian Adventure. She then led a sequence of camel-supported walking expeditions crossing Morocco. In 2019, she explored the Draa River from the river's source to its mouth. Later the same year, she continued from near the river mouth at Chbika, through the Sahara Desert to Western Sahara's border with Mauritania at Guerguerat. In 2020, she crossed the Atlas Mountains from Nador to Ouarzazate to investigate the effects of COVID-19 on the nomadic peoples of the region. She wrote a book about these three expeditions, Walking with Nomads, which was shortlisted for the 2023 Edward Stanford Travel Book of the Year.

=== Saudi Arabia (2024–5) ===
In 2024, Morrison presented a second BBC documentary, Arabian Adventures, a history documentary focusing on the Nabatean Kingdom, including historical site of Hegra in AlUla, in modern-day Saudi Arabia.

The next year, in 2025, Morrison embarked on a foot journey covering the length of Saudi Arabia's Hejaz (western escarpment) from the Halat Ammar border with Jordan in the north to the Yemeni border in the south, near Najran. She was accompanied by camels and supported by vehicles. The expedition was split into two halves, due to the summer heat and the timing of Ramadan, with the first half finished in February, and the second finished in December. The total distance walked was 1,364 miles (2,195 km) over 112 days. She is the first person to complete such a border-to-border walk across Saudi Arabia.

== Selected bibliography ==
Morrison has written books about her expeditions, including:

- My 1001 Nights: Adventures in Morocco (2019).
- Walking with Nomads (2023).
