= Horatio Clare =

Welsh author

- Born: London, England
- Occupation: Author
- Writing career
- Genres: Memoir, travel writing, children's books, fiction, essays

Horatio Clare is a Welsh author of travel, memoir, nature and children's books, travel and feature essays, and writing and broadcasting on mental health and psychiatry. A former BBC producer on Front Row (BBC Radio 4), Night Waves (BBC Radio 3) and The Verb (BBC Radio 3), he presents the Sound Walks series on BBC Radio 3, and is also the writer and co-presenter of the Radio 4 series Is Psychiatry Working? He is a senior lecturer in creative non-fiction at the University of Manchester.

== Background ==
Born in London, Clare grew up on a hill farm in the Black Mountains of South Wales. He later attended Malvern College and the United World College of the Atlantic before reading English at the University of York. He taught at the International School of Verona, the University of Liverpool, Liverpool John Moores, and currently the University of Manchester.

== Literary career ==
Clare's first book, Running for the Hills (2006), was a memoir, described by John Carey in The Sunday Times as: 'the equivalent of a collection of poems by Ted Hughes – or even Wordsworth'. It won the Somerset Maugham Award and saw Clare shortlisted for Sunday Times Young Writer of the Year 2007.

His second novel, Truant: Notes from the Slippery Slope, is a contribution to the debate about cannabis, and led Carlo Gebler in The Irish Times to advise 'Get your stoner friend a copy. It might just save their life.'

It was followed by several works of travel and nature writing. A Single Swallow (2009) traces the migration of barn swallows from South Africa to South Wales. Annabel Goldie in The Herald called it: 'An extraordinary and mesmerising odyssey'

In 2012 and 2013 Clare travelled with Maersk Lines as a writer in residence on container ships. His account of the ships, oceans and crews he encountered on voyages from Felixstowe to Los Angeles, and from Antwerp to Montreal, Down to the Sea in Ships (2014), was described by The Independent as: 'a lyrical, heartfelt and eye-opening chronicle'. The book won the Stanford Dolman Travel Book of the Year.

Two children's books, Aubrey and the Terrible Yoot and a sequel, Aubrey and the Terrible Ladybirds, were published in 2015 and 2017. Both Aubrey books were longlisted for the Carnegie Medal. Aubrey and the Terrible Yoot won the Branford Boase Award for Best Debut Children's Book, the judges commenting: 'Horatio Clare writes about nature as well as T.H. White.'

In 2015 Clare won the Royal Geographical Society / Neville Shulman Challenge Award, for Orison for a Curlew, a combination of travel and nature writing, concentrating on the conservationists who tried to save the bird. The Times Literary Supplement commented: 'Busy and vigorous humanity is the subject to which Clare is best suited; he has a sharp ear for it, and thanks to Clare's generosity toward his subjects, the wealth of backstory and anecdote in his Orison practically hums with it.'

In 2017 Chatto & Windus published Icebreaker – A Voyage Far North, the record of a journey around the Bothnian Bay with the Finnish government's icebreaker Otso. It was the New Statesman's Book of the Year, and The Economist commented: 'Light fills his writing... Mr Clare is a great enjoyer – of people, landscape, and above all of language.' Icebreaker was shortlisted for the Wales Book of the Year Award 2017.

Clare's 2019 book The Light in the Dark: A Winter Journal is an exploration of the highs and lows of the British winter, acclaimed by critics for its emotional power. 'As travel writer, nature writer, memory retriever and... prose-poet of mesmerising lyricism, Horatio Clare is a celebrant and observer of what is lovely, less lovely and sometimes, thankfully, absurd in the world,' wrote Juliet Nicolson in The Spectator.

Heavy Light: A Journey Through Madness, Mania and Healing appeared in 2021, published by Chatto & Windus. The work describes Clare's own breakdown, sectioning, psychiatric treatment, and recovery. The Daily Telegraph judged it 'game changing' for its insights into the causes, course and treatment of breakdown. 'What a gift,' wrote Megan Andrew in The Sunday Times, 'having such an articulate agent, reporting back from the far edges of the mind.'

In 2024 Penguin Life published Your Journey Your Way – The Recovery Guide to Mental Health, a study of new treatments and approaches to mental health recovery. The Observer judged it 'a generous and deeply researched guide to navigating mental health care'. It was a Sunday Times Best Self-help Book of 2024.

We Came By Sea - stories of a greater Britain was published in 2025 by Little Toller Books, telling the unreported story of the small boats crisis. 'This is bold, exhilarating thinking' commented the Times Literary Supplement. 'Powerful...' said The Spectator, 'at grassroots level he finds British people filled with compassion, generosity and courage'. The book was shortlisted for the Nero Book Awards 2025.

== Awards and honours ==
- 2007 Somerset Maugham Award winner for Running for the Hills
- 2007 Sunday Times Young Writer of the Year Award shortlist for Running for the Hills
- 2010 Dolman Best Travel Book Award shortlisted for A Single Swallow
- 2015 Wales Book of the Year Shortlisted for Down to the Sea in Ships
- 2015 Stanford Dolman Travel Book of the Year winner for Down to the Sea in Ships
- 2016 Branford Boase Award Winner, Debut Children's Book of the Year, Aubrey and the Terrible Yoot.
- 2016 Carnegie Medal, Longlist, for Aubrey and the Terrible Yoot
- 2017 Carnegie Medal, Longlist for Aubrey and the Terrible Ladybirds
- 2018 Wales Book of the Year, Shortlisted for Icebreaker – A Voyage Far North
- 2018 Grand Prix des Lecteurs Le Journal de Mickey, Shortlisted for Aubrey and the Terrible Yoot
- 2025 Nero Book Awards, shortlisted for We Came By Sea - stories of a greater Britain

== Publications ==
- —— (2003). Marrakech the Red City: The City through Writers' Eyes. Sickle Moon / Eland.
- —— (2005). Meetings with Remarkable Muslims. Eland.
- —— (2006). Sicily: Through Writers' Eyes. Eland.
- —— (2006). Running for the Hills. John Murray.
- —— (2007). Truant: Notes from a Slippery Slope. John Murray.
- —— (2009). A Single Swallow. Chatto & Windus (UK) and Nieuw Amsterdam (Netherlands).
- —— (2011). The Prince's Pen. Seren Books.
- —— (2014). Down to the Sea in Ships. Chatto & Windus.
- —— (2015). The Paratrooper's Princess. Accent Press / Quickreads.
- —— (2015). Orison for a Curlew. Little Toller Books.
- —— (2015). Aubrey and the Terrible Yoot. Firefly.
- —— (2017). Aubrey and the Terrible Ladybirds. Firefly.
- —— (2017). Myths and Legends of the Brecon Beacons. Graffeg.
- —— (2017). Icebreaker – A Voyage Far North. Chatto & Windus.
- —— (2018). Something of His Art: Walking to Lübeck with J. S. Bach. Little Toller.
- —— (2019). The Light in the Dark: A Winter Journal. Elliott & Thompson Limited.
- —— (2021). Heavy Light: A Journey Through Madness, Mania and Healing. Chatto & Windus.
- —— (2024). Your Journey Your Way: how to make the mental health system work for you. Penguin Life.
- —— (2025). We Came by Sea. Little Toller.
