= Katherine Russell Rich =

American writer (1955–2012)

Katherine Russell Rich (November 17, 1955 – April 3, 2012) was an American autobiographical writer from New York City. Her first book, The Red Devil: To Hell with Cancer, and Back, told of a clash of cultures occurring when the author's breast cancer treatment caused her to lose her hair just when both romantic and professional difficulties came to a head. She had wanted the book to be called Chemosabe.

Her book Dreaming in Hindi: Coming Awake in Another Language, details a year she spent in India on assignment for The New York Times. Having been sent there to interview the Dalai Lama's doctor, her assignment turned into a journey of linguistic awakening and of self-discovery. It was nominated for the 2011 Dolman Travel Book Award.

Rich's articles were featured in The New York Times, The New York Times Magazine, The Washington Post, The Oregonian, O: The Oprah Magazine, Vogue and Salon. She received several grants and fellowships, including ones from the New York Foundation for the Arts, the New York Public Library’s Center for Scholars and Writers, the MacDowell Colony, Yaddo, and a Guggenheim Fellowship (2011).

Rich was interviewed for and was the subject of the third act of This American Life radio blog Episode 425, which aired on January 21, 2011.
