= Monisha Rajesh =

British journalist and travel writer

- Born: 1982 (age 43–44); Norfolk, United Kingdom
- Occupations: Journalist and travel writer
- Writing career
- Notable work: Around The World in 80 Trains
- Website: monisharajesh.com

Monisha Rajesh (born 1982) is a British journalist and travel writer.

== Early life ==
Rajesh was born in Norfolk, England, the child of two Indian doctors with origins in Tamil Nadu and Hyderabad. The family moved from Sheffield to Madras, India, in 1991. After two years they returned to England and she made only occasional visits to India over the next twenty years: "little more than the occasional family wedding had succeeded in tempting me back". She attended King Edward VI High School for Girls in Birmingham, studied French at the University of Leeds, and has a postgraduate diploma in magazine journalism from the Department of Journalism, City University.

== Career ==
Rajesh has worked for The Week and written for The Guardian, The Times, The New York Times and Time.

In 2010, she embarked on a four-month journey around India by train, using 80 train journeys to reach the furthest points of the Indian rail network, described in her 2012 book Around India in 80 Trains. The book was named as one of The Independent's "Top ten books about India".

She subsequently travelled around the world in another 80 train journeys, writing Around the World in 80 Trains (2019), which The Independent listed in 2020 as one of "10 best travel books to satisfy your wanderlust in lockdown". This book won the 2019 National Geographic Traveller Book of the Year..

Rajesh won the 2020 National Consumer Feature of the Year award of the Travel Media Awards for a piece in The Guardian about the Trans-Siberian Railway.

She was one of the judges for the 2021 Stanford Dolman Travel Book of the Year , after her Around the World in 80 Trains was shortlisted for the 2020 award.

In December 2025 Rajesh's most recent book Moonlight Express: Around the World by Night Train, documenting the resurgence in European sleeper trains, was shortlisted for the 2026 Edward Stanford Travel Book of the Year.

In mid-2021 Rajesh received racist abuse on social media as a result of her criticism of depictions of autism and of students of colour in Kate Clanchy's book Some Kids I Taught and What They Taught Me. In November 2025, she appeared on a BBC podcast documentary speaking about the incident.

== Selected publications ==
- Rajesh, Monisha (2012). Around India in 80 Trains. Nicholas Brealey. ISBN 978-1-85788-595-8.
- Rajesh, Monisha (2019). Around the World in 80 Trains. Bloomsbury. ISBN 978-1408869758.
- Rajesh, Monisha (2022). Epic Train Journeys. Gestalten. ISBN 978-3967040203.
- Rajesh, Monisha (2025). Moonlight Express: Around the World by Night Train. Bloomsbury. ISBN 978-1-526644-121.
