= Silvia Vasquez-Lavado =

Peruvian-American explorer, and mountaineer

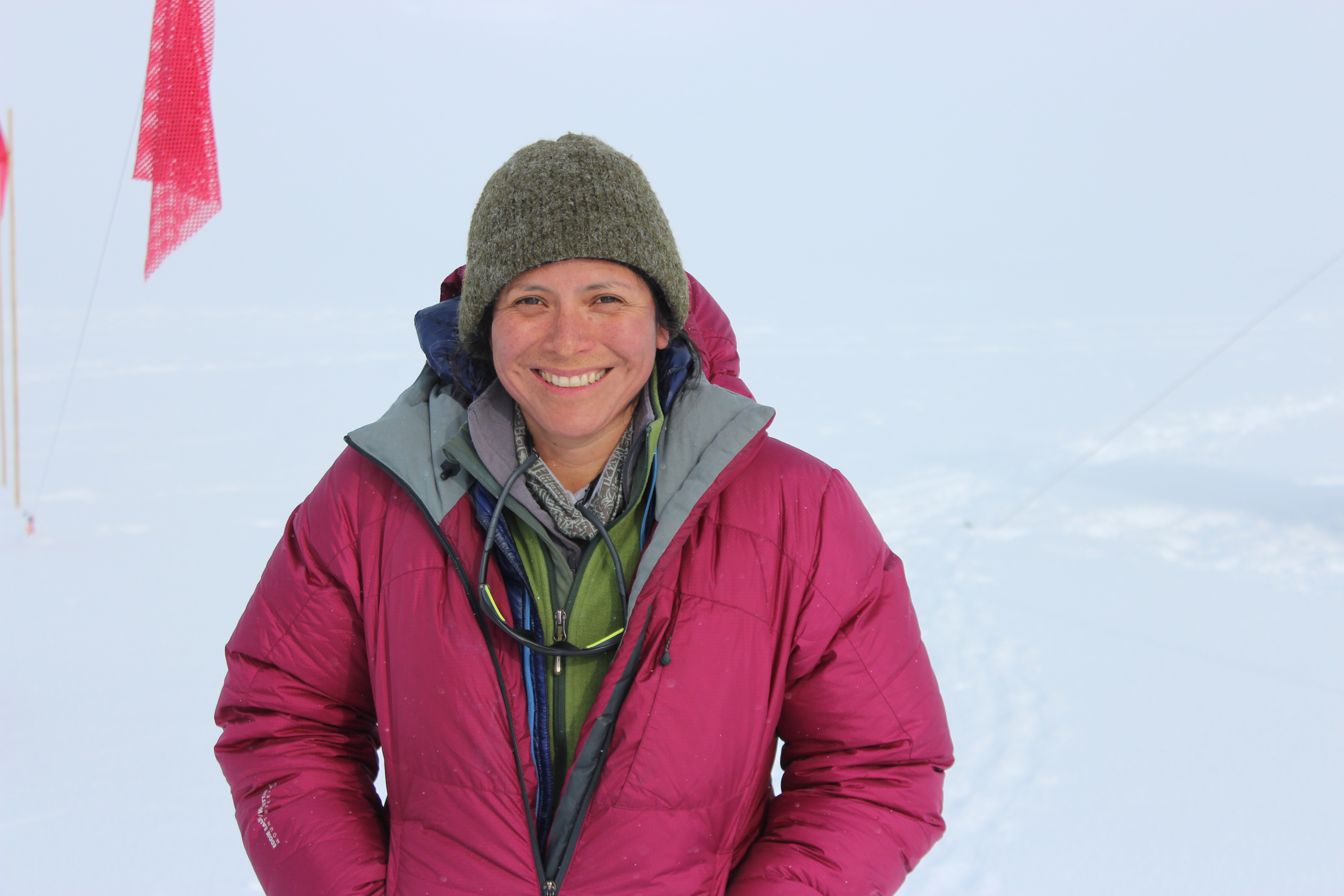
Silvia Vasquez Lavado, Antarctica January 2016

Silvia Vasquez-Lavado (born 1974) is a Peruvian-American mountaineer, writer, social entrepreneur and technologist. In June 2016, she became the first Peruvian woman to summit Mount Everest and the first openly gay woman to complete the Seven Summits, the tallest mountain on each continent from both the Messner and Bass lists.

== Early life and education ==
Silvia Vasquez-Lavado was born and raised in Lima, Peru, during the Peruvian terrorist movement, the Shining Path. Vasquez-Lavado was a victim of childhood sexual abuse. After sharing her struggles with childhood abuse, Vasquez-Lavado's mother encouraged her to leave Peru.

Vasquez-Lavado came to the US on an IIE/Fulbright scholarship and attended Millersville University. She lives in San Francisco.

== Mountain climbing ==
Vasquez-Lavado struggled with depression and alcoholism during her 20s as a result of the trauma from her abuse. In 2005, while attending a ayahuasca meditation retreat in Peru, Vasquez-Lavado had a vision of reconnecting to her inner child and the two of them walking in a valley surrounded by mountains.

Shortly after, Vasquez-Lavado decided to go to Mount Everest base camp in October 2005. After a four-day trek, Vasquez-Lavado arrived at the base of Everest and climbed Kala Pattar. She later summited Everest in May 2016. She is one of the few women in the world to have completed the "Eight Summits" as of 2019, climbing the Seven Summits across both the Bass and Messner lists.

=== Mountaineering summits ===
- Kilimanjaro (Tanzania) in September 2006
- Mount Elbrus (Russia) in August 2007
- Mont Blanc (Europe) in July 2011
- Aconcagua (Argentina) in January 2014
- Mount Kosciuszko (Australia) in October 2014
- Carstensz Pyramid (Indonesia) in March 2015
- Vinson Massif (Antarctica) in December 2015
- Mount Everest (Nepal) in May 2016
- Denali / McKinley (Alaska) in June 2018

== Social impact ==
In 2014, Vasquez-Lavado launched Courageous Girls, a nonprofit that helps survivors of sexual abuse and trafficking with opportunities to find their strength and cultivate their voice by demonstrating their physical strength. Courageous Girls has had projects in Nepal, India, the United States, and Peru.

== In the Shadow of the Mountain ==
In the Shadow of the Mountain, Silvia's first memoir, was released February 1, 2022, in the United States, and internationally on February 3, 2022. In a review for The New York Times, Qian Julie Wang wrote: "Patriarchal societies champion summit journeys as tales of conquest. But Vasquez-Lavado understands that 'we do not conquer Everest, just like we do not conquer trauma. Instead, we must yield ourselves to the chasms and unexpected avalanches.'" Kirkus Reviews called In the Shadow of the Mountain "An emotionally raw and courageous memoir."

In November 2020, the Hollywood Reporter announced that Selena Gomez is set to be cast as Vasquez-Lavado on the film adaption of In the Shadow of the Mountain.

In March 2023, In the Shadow of the Mountain won the prestigious 2023 Edward Stanford Travel Book of the year.

== Honors and awards ==
Vasquez-Lavado was recognized by Fortune as one of the Corporate Heroes of 2015. CNET named her one of the 20 most influential Latinos in Silicon Valley. She has been recognized by the Peruvian government as one of the "Marca Peru" ambassadors (country brand ambassadors). Vasquez-Lavado, a distinguished member of the Explorers Club, received an honorary Doctor of Humane Letters from Millersville University and served as its commencement speaker on May 7, 2022.
