= In the Shadow of the Mountain =

2022 book

In the Shadow of the Mountain: A Memoir of Courage
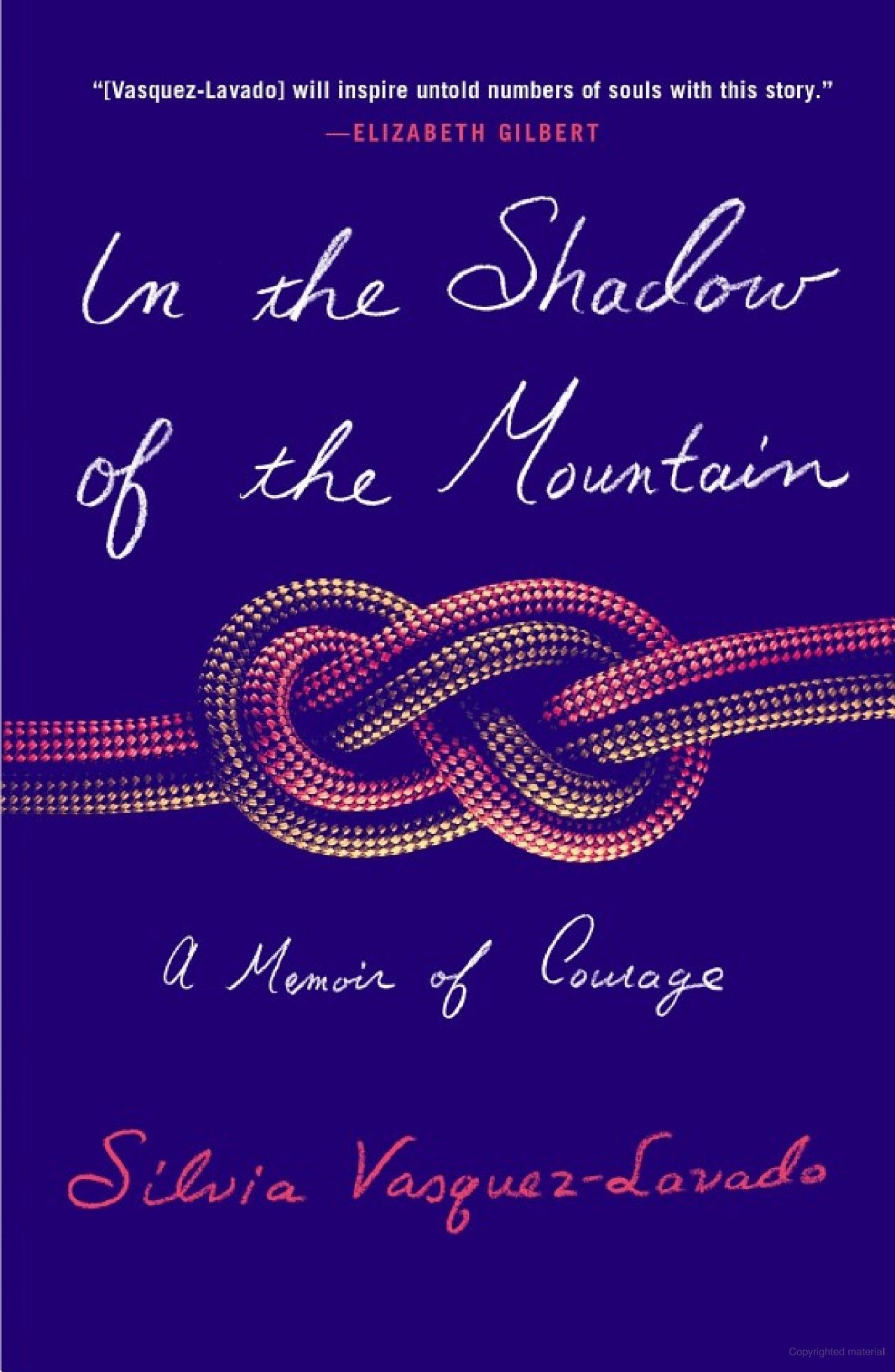
- Author: Silvia Vasquez-Lavado
- Language: English
- Genres: Memoir; Addiction memoir; Grief memoir; Adventure; Self help; Lgbtqia
- Publisher: Henry Holt
- Publication date: February 1, 2022
- Media type: Hardcover, Paperback, Kindle Edition, Audible Audio
- Pages: 305
- ISBN: 978-1250776747

In the Shadow of the Mountain: A Memoir of Courage is a book by Silvia Vasquez-Lavado published in 2022 by Henry Holt an imprint of Macmillan.

== Summary ==
The book details the author's personal story of surviving childhood sexual abuse and domestic violence in Peru and how she overcame those experiences to become a successful businesswoman and mountaineer. The memoir also documents Vasquez-Lavado's promise to bring a group of survivors from sexual abuse and sex trafficking to the base of Mount Everest before Vasquez-Lavado's journey to climb Mount Everest. In addition, In The Shadow of the Mountain documents Vasquez-Lavado's voyage climbing the highest peaks on each continent.

This is the author's first book. In addition, there is an ongoing film adaptation with Elgin James to direct and Selena Gomez scheduled to play Silvia.

== Reception ==
The New York Times Book Review published on February 1, 2022, praises the book by sharing, In a world that demands us to harden, to tell stories of strength and triumph, the bravest act can be embracing our inner child, our fears, our truths, called in the shadow of the mountain.

Elizabeth Hightower Allen of Outside commented "In the Shadow of the Mountain is for anyone with similarly challenging inner journeys—in other words, all of us."

People Magazine called In the Shadow of the mountain "gripping memoir about coping with addiction and sexual violence through mountain climbing".

In March 2023, In the Shadow of the Mountain was awarded the prestigious Edward Stanford Travel Writing Awards as the Stanford Travel Book of the Year. Named "a remarkable story of compassion, humility, and strength; Silvia beautifully documents her heroic journey to the summit of Everest, accompanied by five other women, each struggling to come to terms with their trauma."
