= Robert Macfarlane (writer) =

British nature writer (born 1976)

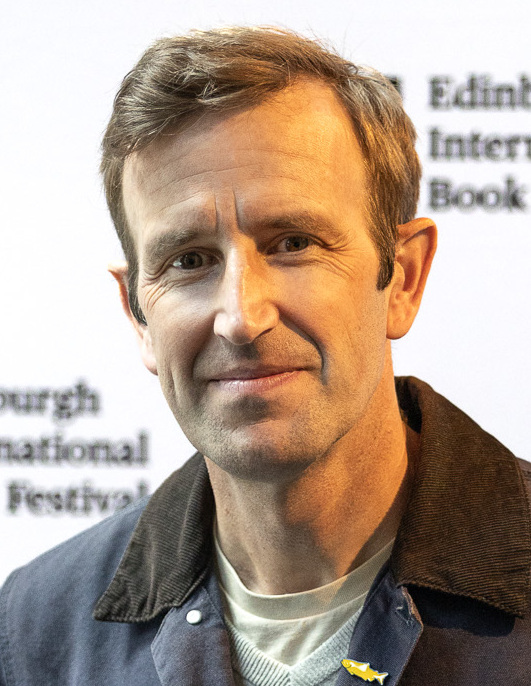
- Macfarlane in 2025
- Born: 15 August 1976 (age 50); Halam, Nottinghamshire, England
- Education: Pembroke College, Cambridge, and Magdalen College, Oxford.
- Occupations: Writer, Professor
- Known for: Nature writing
- Notable work: Mountains of the Mind; The Wild Places; The Old Ways; Landmarks; The Lost Words; Underland; Is a River Alive?
- Spouse: Julia Lovell
- Children: Lily Macfarlane, Thomas Macfarlane, William Macfarlane

Robert Macfarlane (born 15 August 1976) is a British non-fiction writer, and a Fellow of Emmanuel College, Cambridge. Macfarlane is best known for his books on landscape, nature, place, people and language, which include The Old Ways (2012), Landmarks (2015), The Lost Words (2017), Underland (2019) and Is a River Alive? (2025), and for his many collaborations with musicians, composers and artists.

In 2017, Macfarlane received The E. M. Forster Award for Literature from the American Academy of Arts and Letters. In 2022 and 2024, he was named as an outside contender for the Nobel Prize in Literature. The Prize in those years was won by Annie Ernaux and Han Kang respectively.

Macfarlane is married to professor of modern Chinese history and literature Julia Lovell.

== Early life and education ==
Robert Macfarlane was born in Halam in Nottinghamshire, where he attended Nottingham High School.

Macfarlane's father, John Macfarlane, is a respiratory physician who co-authored the CURB-65 score of pneumonia in 2003. His brother, James Macfarlane, is also a consultant physician in respiratory medicine. One grandfather was the British diplomat and mountaineer Edward Peck; the other was radar scientist and pioneer George G. Macfarlane.

Macfarlane was educated at Pembroke College, Cambridge, and Magdalen College, Oxford. He began a PhD at Emmanuel College, Cambridge, in 2000, and in 2001 was elected a Fellow of the college.

He is Professor of Literature and the Environmental Humanities at the University of Cambridge; a founding member of the MOTH (More Than Human) Life Collective, 'an interdisciplinary initiative advancing rights and well-being for humans, non-humans and the web of life that sustains us all', based out of New York University's School of Law; and in 2026 he was appointed to the Arne Naess Chair in Global Justice and the Environment at the University of Oslo.

== Background ==
Macfarlane is a nature writer in the broadest sense, part of a tradition of writing about landscape, place, travel, and nature that includes John Muir, Richard Jefferies and Edward Thomas, as well as contemporary figures like John McPhee, Rebecca Solnit, Annie Dillard, Barry Lopez, and Macfarlane's friend Roger Deakin. He is associated with other walker-writers, including Patrick Leigh Fermor, Nan Shepherd and Laurie Lee, and seen as one of a number of recent British writers who have provoked a new critical and popular interest in writing about landscape. His interests in topography, ecology and the environment have been explored in his books, and also through essays, notably his Common Ground series, which was published in The Guardian in 2005.

Macfarlane has also published many reportage and travel essays in magazines, especially Granta and Archipelago, as well as numerous introductory essays to reissues of lost and neglected classics of landscape and nature writing from the nineteenth and twentieth centuries, notably J. A. Baker (The Peregrine) and Nan Shepherd (The Living Mountain and In The Cairngorms).

== Books ==
Macfarlane's first book, Mountains of the Mind, was published in 2003 and won the Guardian First Book Award, the Somerset Maugham Award, and the Sunday Times Young Writer of the Year Award. It was shortlisted for the Boardman Tasker Prize for Mountain Literature and the John Llewellyn Rhys Prize. It is an account of the development of Western attitudes to mountains and precipitous landscapes, and takes its title from a line by the poet Gerard Manley Hopkins. The book asks why people, including Macfarlane, are drawn to mountains despite their obvious dangers, and examines the powerful and sometimes fatal hold that mountains can come to have over the imagination. The Irish Times described the book as "a new kind of exploration writing, perhaps even the birth of a new genre, which demands a new category of its own."

Original Copy: Plagiarism and Originality in Nineteenth-Century Literature was published in March 2007. In the book, Macfarlane examines originality and plagiarism in English literature between 1859 and 1900, and explores the changing understanding of originality and self seen in Romantic and Victorian literature. He presents two theories of literary originality: creatio, (Note: A related term exists in religious cosmology.) meaning creation 'from nothing', and inventio, (Note: A related term exists in rhetoric.) meaning creation based on "inventive reuse". Macfarlane argues that a key element of English literature during the nineteenth century was a gradual rejection of creatio in favour of prioritising inventio.

The book includes discussion of the works of Charles Dickens, George Eliot, Walter Pater, Oscar Wilde, Charles Reade, Lionel Johnson and George Henry Lewes. Original Copy was positively received by both academic and journalistic reviewers. In a 2008 review, Meg Jensen described the book as arguing in favour of an "open and collaborative response of authors to works of the past." Jensen noted that this view diverged from that of Macfarlane's fellow Pembroke College alumnus Harold Bloom, whose 1973 book The Anxiety of Influence interpreted "literary inheritance as a burden that must be concealed and negotiated".

The Wild Places was published in September 2007, and describes a series of journeys made in search of the wildness that remains in Britain and Ireland. The book won the Boardman Tasker Prize for Mountain Literature, the Scottish Arts Council Non-Fiction Book of the Year Award, and the Grand Prize at the Banff Mountain Festival, North America's equivalent of the Boardman Tasker Prize. It became a best-seller in Britain and The Netherlands, and was shortlisted for six further prizes, including the Dolman Best Travel Book Award, the Sunday Times Young Writer of the Year Award, the John Llewellyn Rhys Prize, and North America's Orion Book Award, a prize founded "to recognize books that deepen our connection to the natural world, present new ideas about our relationship with nature, and achieve excellence in writing." The Wild Places was adapted for television by the BBC as an episode of the BBC Two Natural World series broadcast in February 2010; the film later won a Wildscreen Award.

The Old Ways: A Journey On Foot, the third in the "loose trilogy of books about landscape and the human heart" begun by Mountains of the Mind and The Wild Places, was published in June 2012. The book describes the years Macfarlane spent following "old ways" (pilgrimage paths, sea-roads, prehistoric trackways, ancient rights of way) in southeast England, northwest Scotland, Spain, Sichuan and Palestine. Its guiding spirit is the early twentieth-century writer and poet, Edward Thomas, and its chief subject is the reciprocal shaping of people and place.

The Old Ways was in the bestseller lists for six months. It was acclaimed as a "tour de force" by William Dalrymple in The Observer. It was chosen as Book of the Year by John Banville, Philip Pullman, Jan Morris, John Gray, Antony Beevor, and Dan Stevens among others. In the UK, it was joint winner of the Dolman Prize for Travel Writing, was shortlisted for the Samuel Johnson Prize (the "non-fiction Booker"), the Jan Michalski Prize for World Literature, the Duff Cooper Prize for Non-Fiction, the Warwick Prize for Writing, the Waterstones Book of the Year, and three other prizes. In the US, it was shortlisted for the Orion Book Award.

Landmarks, a book that celebrates and defends the language of landscape, was published in the UK in March 2015. A version of its first chapter, published in The Guardian as The Word-Hoard, went viral, and the book became a Sunday Times number one bestseller. It was shortlisted for The Samuel Johnson Prize for non-fiction. Landmarks is described on the cover as "a field guide to the literature of nature, and a vast glossary collecting thousands of the remarkable terms used in dozens of the languages and dialects of Britain and Ireland to describe and denote aspects of terrain, weather, and nature". Each of the book's chapters explores the landscapes and style of a writer or writers, as Macfarlane travels to meet farmers, sailors, walkers, glossarians, artists, poets and others who have developed intense and committing relationships with their chosen places. The chapter of the book concerning Nan Shepherd and the Cairngorm mountains was adapted for television by BBC4 and BBC Scotland.

Macfarlane's detailed writing style, and his frequent references to dialect vocabulary, were satirised in a February 2016 edition of Private Eye by Craig Brown in the magazine's regular "Diary" feature. Landmarks was published in the US in August 2016. It was described by Tom Shippey in The Wall Street Journal as a book that "teaches us to love our world, even the parts of it that we have neglected. Mr Macfarlane is the great nature writer, and nature poet, of this generation."

In May 2016 Macfarlane published The Gifts of Reading, a short book about gifts, stories and the unexpected consequences of generosity. All work for the book was given for free, and all moneys raised were donated to MOAS, the Migrant Offshore Aid Station, to save refugee lives.

With the artist Jackie Morris, Macfarlane published The Lost Words: A Spell Book in October 2017. The book became what the Guardian called 'a cultural phenomenon', winning Children's Book of the Year at the British Book Awards jointly with The Hate U Give by Angie Thomas. The "lost" words of the book's title are twenty of the names for everyday nature—from "Acorn" through to "Wren" by way of "Bluebell", "Kingfisher", "Lark" and "Otter"—that were controversially dropped from inclusion in the Oxford Junior Dictionary due to under-use by children. Grassroots campaigns sprang up to raise money to place copies of the book in every primary and special school in all of Scotland, half of England and a quarter of Wales.

Funds were also raised to place a copy in every hospice in Britain. The book is used by charities and carers working with dementia sufferers, refugees, survivors of domestic abuse, childhood cancer patients, and people in terminal care. It has been adapted for dance, outdoor theatre, choral music and classical music. In 2018 the new Royal National Orthopaedic Hospital at Stanmore opened its new building with four levels decorated with art and poems from The Lost Words. It was the inspiration for Spell Songs, a folk music concert and album by musicians including Beth Porter, Karine Polwart, Julie Fowlis and Kris Drever.

Underland: A Deep Time Journey was published in May 2019. It is a book about the deep-time pasts and futures of the Earth, as revealed by mythical underworlds and real subterranean journeys. The book became a bestseller in the UK and the US, and has been translated into more than twenty languages. It was serialized on BBC Radio 4 as the Book of the Week for 29 April - 3 May 2019.

Is a River Alive?, published in May 2025, explores the relationships between rivers, human cultures and the law. It asks what the consequences are of taking seriously the idea that rivers might have lives, deaths and rights. It incorporates themes of animism and the Rights of Nature movement. The book also includes collaborations with artists, researchers, and activists such as Cosmo Sheldrake and Rita Mestokosho. Its form becomes progressively more fluid as it progresses. It became a Number One bestseller in the UK in both hardback and paperback, a New York Times bestseller and a Globe and Mail bestseller.

The Book of Birds, co-created with the artist Jackie Morris, was published in 2026. It re-imagined the classic 'bird-book' or 'field guide' for what Macfarlane and Morris called a time of 'wonder and loss'. It became a New York Times bestseller and a number one Sunday Times bestseller, and was the 2026 Wainwright Prize Book of the Year and the category winner for Illustrative books.

== Films ==
In collaboration with director Jen Peedom, cinematographer Renan Ozturk, and composer Richard Tognetti, Macfarlane worked on the documentary film Mountain, which premiered with a live performance from the Australian Chamber Orchestra at the Sydney Opera House in June 2017. Macfarlane's script was voiced by Willem Dafoe. Mountain became the highest-grossing Australian documentary of all time, and won three Australian Academy Awards.

He has also written with same director and writer Jennifer Peedom and co-director and writer Joseph Nizeti for the movie River (2022). The film includes Willem Dafoe as a narrator.

In 2025 a feature-length adaptation of Macfarlane's book Underland, directed by Rob Petit, co-produced by Darren Aronofsky and scored by composer Hannah Peel, premiered at the Tribeca Film Festival.

With the Oscar-nominated composer Hauschka and the director Rob Petit, Macfarlane made Upstream, a film set in the Cairngorm mountains in winter.

Macfarlane's 2012 book Holloway was adapted into a short film shot on Super-8 by the film-maker Adam Scovell.

== Music ==
As a lyricist, librettist and spoken-word performer, Macfarlane has collaborated with numerous musicians. With his close friend the musician-singer-actor Johnny Flynn, he wrote two albums: Lost In The Cedar Wood (2021) and The Moon Also Rises (2023). He and Flynn adapted Lost In The Cedar Wood into a two-person "story-song" show, which opened at the Globe Theatre in London in January 2022, before a sell-out tour later that year. In May 2024, the pair toured a full-length sell-out show called "The River Calls", supported by the "River Band".

In November 2022 he began working with musician Hayden Thorpe, former frontman of band Wild Beasts, on an adaptation of Macfarlane's book Ness into a full-length album. Thorpe released Ness with Domino Records in September 2024, and toured the album in the UK and Europe, with Macfarlane sometimes appearing as co-performer. The first live performances of the album were held on the former nuclear-weapons testing site of Orford Ness, which inspired both book and album. A defused WE.177 nuclear weapon was placed centrally in the audience.

In June 2012, Macfarlane wrote the libretto to a "jazz opera" called Untrue Island, composed by the double-bassist Arnie Somogyi, and performed in a former nuclear weapons storage hangar on Orford Ness.

In January 2025 The Times reported that Macfarlane had recently completed work on the libretto for a full-length choral work called The World Tree, in part a "requiem for the [felled] Sycamore Gap tree", composed by the Finnish-Canadian composer Matthew Whittall. The World Tree was premiered by the Helsinki Chamber Choir in Helsinki on 18 November 2025.

In 2026, he wrote the liner notes of Sunn O)))’s self-titled album. With the folk-classical duo Stevens & Pound, he co-created, performed and toured a new mini-concerto, 'Earth: the Silent Planet', as part of a wider re-imagining by the trio of Gustav Holst's The Planets Suite.

He has also collaborated with musicians including Ben Frost, Sam Lee, Elisa Schmelkes and others.

== Conservation efforts ==
In 2018 Macfarlane co-edited, with Chris Packham and Patrick Barkham, A People's Manifesto For Wildlife, arguing for urgent and large-scale change in Britain's relationship with nature. 10,000 people marched on Whitehall to deliver the manifesto to DEFRA. He has been involved with the Sheffield tree-protectors campaign, fighting the unnecessary felling of thousands of street trees in the city. Macfarlane wrote 'Heartwood', a poem for the protestors, which was set to music, flyposted and subvertised across Sheffield, and hung as a 'charm' around endangered trees.

He is a patron of the Outdoor Swimming Society, the Outlandia Project, ONCA (One Network for Conservation and the Arts), and Gateway To Nature, a Lottery-funded mental-health initiative designed to improve access to nature for vulnerable groups and individuals. He is a founding Trustee of the charity Action For Conservation, which works to inspire a lifelong engagement with conservation in 12–17 year olds, working especially with schools with high pupil premium levels.

== Collaborations ==
Most of Macfarlane's books have been jacketed with original work by the artist Stanley Donwood, known for his close association with the band Radiohead, exceptions include his book The Lost Words, for example, which was illustrated by Jackie Morris. Macfarlane also collaborated with Donwood and writer Dan Richards on Holloway, published in an edition of 277 by Quive-Smith Press in 2012, and a trade edition by Faber & Faber in May 2013, which became a Sunday Times best-seller. Macfarlane and Donwood collaborated on an edition of Thomas Hardy's poems published by The Folio Society in 2021. Macfarlane selected and introduced 109 poems for the edition with Donwood providing the illustrations.

His work has been involved with the music of contemporary musicians including Johnny Flynn, Frank Turner, The Memory Band, Grasscut, Julie Fowlis and Karine Polwart. He co-wrote the song Coins for Eyes with Flynn for the 9th series of the BBC programme Digging for Britain.

He has designed with Danish-Icelandic artist Olafur Eliasson a steel pool installation planned to be on the beach of Silecroft in Cumbria as part of a new art program for Lake District Coast. The oval basin which will fill up twice a day with sea water during high tide will reflect the sky and be viewed from an observatory platform during low tide when the sea levels lower exposing the basin. The form of the basin is inspired by Neolithic cup and ring engravings found on boulders in the district and elsewhere in Europe.

== Awards and honours ==
- 2003: Guardian First Book Award, winner, Mountains of the Mind
- 2004: Somerset Maugham Award, winner, Mountains of the Mind
- 2004: Sunday Times Young Writer of the Year Award, winner, Mountains of the Mind
- 2007: Boardman-Tasker Prize for Mountain Literature, winner, The Wild Places
- 2008: Grand Prize Banff Mountain Festival, winner, The Wild Places
- 2008: Scottish Non-Fiction Book of the Year Award, winner, The Wild Places
- 2011: Philip Leverhulme Prize in Modern European Languages and Literature
- 2011: Elected Fellow of the Royal Society of Literature
- 2012: Samuel Johnson Prize, shortlist, The Old Ways
- 2013: Dolman Best Travel Book Award, winner, The Old Ways
- 2013: Jan Michalski Prize for Literature, finalist, The Old Ways
- 2013: Warwick Prize for Writing, shortlist, The Old Ways
- 2015: Hay Festival Medal for Prose, Landmarks
- 2015: Samuel Johnson Prize, shortlist, Landmarks
- 2017: British Book Awards Children's Book of the Year, The Lost Words
- 2017: E. M. Forster Award for Literature, American Academy of Arts and Letters
- 2019: Wainwright Prize, Underland
- 2019: NDR Kultur Sachbuchpreis, Underland
- 2023: $75,000 Writers' Trust Weston International Award for career achievement in non-fiction
- 2024: Blue Metropolis Planet Earth Literature Prize for a body of work
- 2026: Wainwright Prize Book of the Year and Waterstones Book of the Year (shortlist) for The Book of Birds, with Jackie Morris

== Bibliography ==
=== Books ===
- Macfarlane, Robert (2003). Mountains of the Mind: A History of a Fascination. London and New York: Granta Books and Pantheon Books. ISBN 9780375421808.
- — (2007). Original Copy: Plagiarism and Originality in Nineteenth-Century Literature. Oxford: Oxford University Press. ISBN 9780199296507.
- — (2007). The Wild Places. London and New York: Granta Books and Penguin Books. ISBN 9781862079410.
- — (2012). The Old Ways: A Journey on Foot. London and New York: Hamish Hamilton and Viking Press. ISBN 9780670025114.
- — (2013). Holloway. London: Faber & Faber.
- — (2015). Landmarks. London and New York: Hamish Hamilton and Viking Press.
- The Gifts of Reading. London: Penguin Books. 2016.
- —; Morris, Jackie (2017). The Lost Words: A Spell Book. Illustrated by Jackie Morris. Hamish Hamilton and House of Anansi Press. ISBN 9780241253588.
- — (2019). Underland: A Deep Time Journey. Hamish Hamilton. ISBN 9780241143803.
- — (2019). Ness. London: Hamish Hamilton. ISBN 9780241396568.
- —; Morris, Jackie (2020). The Lost Spells. Illustrated by Jackie Morris. Hamish Hamilton and House of Anansi Press. ISBN 9781487007799.
- — (2025). Is a River Alive?. Hamish Hamilton. ISBN 9781039007963.
- — (2026). The Book of Birds: A Field Guide to Wonder and Loss. Illustrated by Jackie Morris. W W Norton & Co Inc. ISBN 978-1-324-00684-8
