= Elizabeth Pisani =

British-American epidemiologist, public health consultant and author

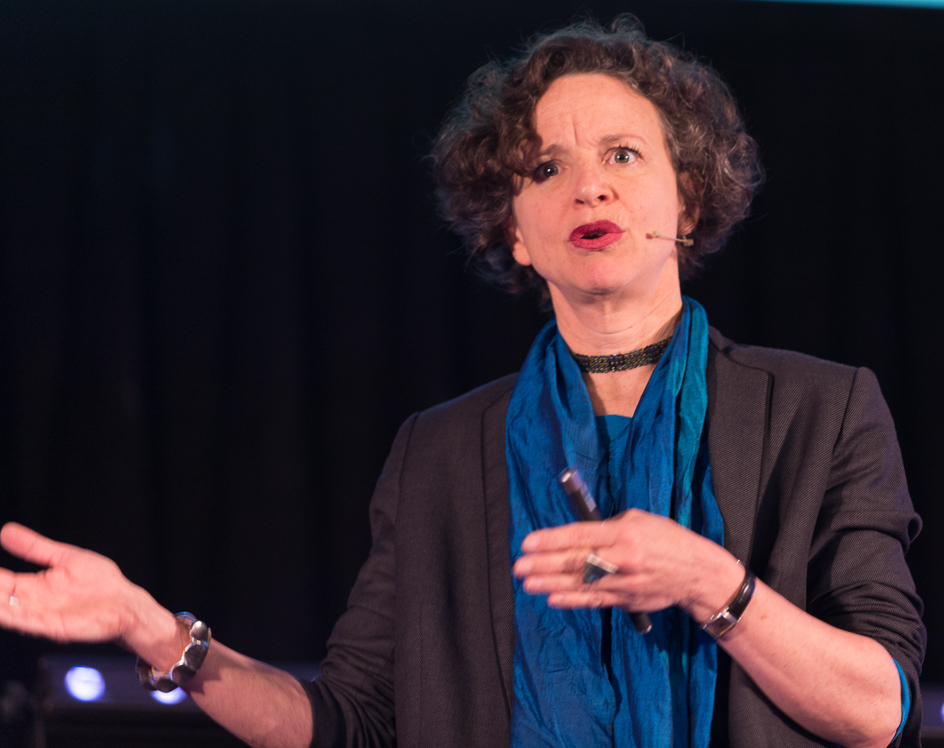
- Pisani at the 2014 QED Conference
- Born: 1964 (age 61–62); United States
- Education: Oxford University, London School of Hygiene and Tropical Medicine,
- Occupations: Epidemiologist, analyst, author
- Notable work: The Wisdom of Whores, Indonesia, etc.
- Website: www.wisdomofwhores.com, indonesiaetc.com

Elizabeth Pisani (born 1964) is a British-American epidemiologist, public health consultant, author and journalist. She is an academic researcher and the director of Ternyata Ltd., a public health consultancy based in London, UK. Her research investigates the ways in which politics, economics and culture influence public health. This has included markets for substandard and falsified medicines and HIV. Before this, Pisani was a journalist who worked as a correspondent for Reuters in several Asian countries.

Her first book The Wisdom of Whores: Bureaucrats, Brothels and the Business of AIDS, which examines factors influencing decision-making for HIV prevention, was longlisted for the Samuel Johnson Prize in 2009. Pisani is also known for her 2014 travel book Indonesia Etc.: Exploring the Improbable Nation, in addition to other writings on the society and politics of Indonesia.

Pisani holds (or has held) visiting or honorary posts at Universitas Pancasila Jakarta (Professor); the George Institute for Global Health (Professorial Fellow); London School of Hygiene and Tropical Medicine (Honorary Associate Professor); the Policy Institute, King's College London (Senior Research Fellow); Imperial College London (Reader); and the School of Health Policy and Management at Erasmus University Rotterdam (Associate Professor).

== Education ==
She was born in the United States and educated in several European countries. She graduated from Oxford University with an MA in classical Chinese in 1986. After working as a journalist for many years, Pisani changed professional course, taking an MSc in Medical Demography and later a PhD in Infectious Disease Epidemiology at the London School of Hygiene & Tropical Medicine.

== Journalism career ==
After her first degree, Pisani joined Reuters as a foreign correspondent, working in Hong Kong, India and Indonesia. She also reported at various times for The Economist and the Asia Times from Jakarta, Hanoi, Phnom Penh, Brussels and Nairobi. During her times as a journalist she covered major political events such as the Tiananmen Square demonstrations and the insurgency in Aceh as well as a wide range of business stories.

== Epidemiology and public health career ==
After retraining as an epidemiologist, Pisani focused on HIV for over a decade, conducting research and working as an advisor for the Ministries of Health of China, Indonesia, East Timor and the Philippines, and for organisations such as the UNAIDS, US Centers for Disease Control and Prevention, World Bank, and the World Health Organization. Her work has focused on HIV, sexually transmitted infections and sexual and drug-taking behaviour, and on building disease surveillance systems.

In the late 2000s, she began working with the Wellcome Trust and other major funders of public health research to increase the sharing of data between scientists so that more knowledge can be squeezed out of expensive field research. She also worked with Wellcome to explore ways of increasing engagement between scientists and society in the countries where they sponsor major research programmes. One outcome of this was the "Foreign Bodies, Common Ground" exhibition, bringing together art from residencies in research centres in Thailand, Vietnam, Malawi, Kenya, South Africa and the UK. In 2016, Pisani initiated a collaboration with an East London based orchestra, the Grand Union Orchestra, which led to "Song of Contagion", a jazz show which tried to explore the reasons for bad decision-making in global health through music.

Pisani wrote the first two editions of the biennial global report on AIDS for UNAIDS in 1998.

In 2008, she published her first book The Wisdom of Whores, which argues that a substantial portion of the funding devoted to HIV and AIDS is wasted on ineffective programming, the result of science and good public health policy being trumped by politics and ideology. It was long-listed for the Samuel Johnson Prize for Non-fiction in 2009. The following year, she gave a TED talk arguing that the "rational" health belief model that underpins many public health campaigns are irrational from the point of view of those they target.

In the mid-2010s, Pisani's interest turned to the quality of medicines. With research grant support from the Wellcome Trust and Erasmus University Rotterdam, she led a four-country study into the political and economic factors driving the market for substandard and falsified medicines, especially in middle income countries, and continues to work in this area.

=== Medicine procurement, pricing and quality ===
While working in an HIV prevention programme in Indonesia in 2004, Pisani and her colleagues discovered that the medicines they were giving female sex workers to cure sexually transmitted infections were not working. There were three possible reasons for this: the women were not taking their medicines correctly; the pathogens were resistant to the medicines; or, the medicines were of poor quality. It turned out to be the second of these, but it took fully four years to change national guidelines and to start treating women with medicines that did work, largely because of the economic interests of government-owned pharmaceutical companies. At the Conference on Medicine Quality and Public Health in Oxford in September 2018, Pisani explained that this incident suggested a link between medicine quality and antimicrobial resistance, as well as in the political drivers of pharmaceutical policy.

In 2016, the UK government's Review on Antimicrobial Resistance asked Pisani to review evidence for the links between poor quality medicine and the development and spread of drug resistant infections. The full report was summarised in an interim paper published by the AMR Review.

With funding from Wellcome Trust, Pisani led a study looking at the political and economic factors that incentivise pharmaceutical companies to produce substandard medicines, and the factors that create market opportunities for criminals to make and sell falsified drugs. The research team looked closely at medicine markets in Indonesia, Romania and Turkey, as well as at producers of active ingredients in China. They concluded that substandard medicines are most common where oversight of production standards is lax and procurement systems push prices so low that companies are incentivised to cut corners. Falsified medicines, on the other hand, appear where there is an unmet demand from patients (sometimes because of aggressive marketing), and where patients or health care providers are incentivised to step outside of the regular supply chain, to cut costs or to maximise profits.

Pisani has initiated and overseen several studies of medicine quality in Indonesia, using different sampling and research methods. These include case finding, exposure-based sampling and random sampling. (Funding for these studies comes from UK National Institutes for Health Research; Australia's National Health and Medical Research Council, and United States Pharmacopeia.) She has also investigated medicine procurement and pricing, with a special interest in the incentives embedded in the supply chain.

=== AIDS prevention ===
Pisani has been a vocal advocate of the harm reduction approach to addressing HIV/AIDS, supporting needle exchange programmes, making condoms widely available, and giving aid to countries that have policies of legalized prostitution. She outlined these views in her book, subsequent articles, interviews, and her 2010 TED Talk. She strongly criticized the regulations imposed by USAID ambassador Randall Tobias, in particular, those forbidding aid recipients from accepting, tolerating, or legalizing prostitution, or promoting anything but abstinence, arguing that organizations of prostitutes are effective at educating those most at risk, and that abstinence-only sex education has been demonstrated to fail in rigorous scientific studies. In addition, she criticized the Catholic Church's prohibition on condom use as a means to prevent the spread of HIV.

In an interview with The Guardian, she said "I don't think it's evil to have anal sex with 16 people in a weekend without condoms. I just think if you do that there's a high likelihood you're going to get infected. That's all. It's cause and effect. And I think if we can prevent a fatal disease, we should. I don't get how it's OK to keep someone alive once they're sick - but not OK to stop them getting sick. I just don't get that." In an article for The Guardian the following year, she criticised the Catholic Church's attitude to HIV/AIDS, asking "[w]hy can't we extend our compassion to those who are not yet infected, and provide them with all the information and tools they need to stay uninfected? Whether the pope likes it or not, those tools include condoms. In her TED Talk, she called the position "clearly irrational."

== Writing on Indonesia ==
In late 2011, Pisani took a sabbatical from her day job to explore Indonesia, where she had worked from 1988 – 1991 as a foreign correspondent, and from 2001 to 2005 in her capacity as an epidemiologist and public health advocate. She blogged about her travels at Portrait Indonesia from late 2011-2013. At the end of 2013, she moved her blog to a new site, Indonesia, Etc. Her travels there form the basis of a book, Indonesia, Etc.: Exploring the Improbable Nation, which was published to critical acclaim in June 2014. The book was listed among the best non-fiction books of 2014 by The Economist and by The Wall Street Journal.

Since working on Indonesia, Etc., Pisani has contributed articles on Indonesian politics, particularly the 2014 presidential election, to Foreign Affairs, The New York Times and Nikkei Asia Review. Pisani has also provided commentary on corruption in Indonesia.

== Personal life ==
In The Wisdom of Whores, Pisani wrote, "I went to Sunday School as a child, and I still go to church every now and then. But I am unable to understand religious convictions or religious ideologies that stand in the way of saving hundreds of thousands of lives."

In addition to English, she is fluent in French and Spanish, and has learned Chinese and Indonesian.
