= Sunn O))) =

American drone metal band

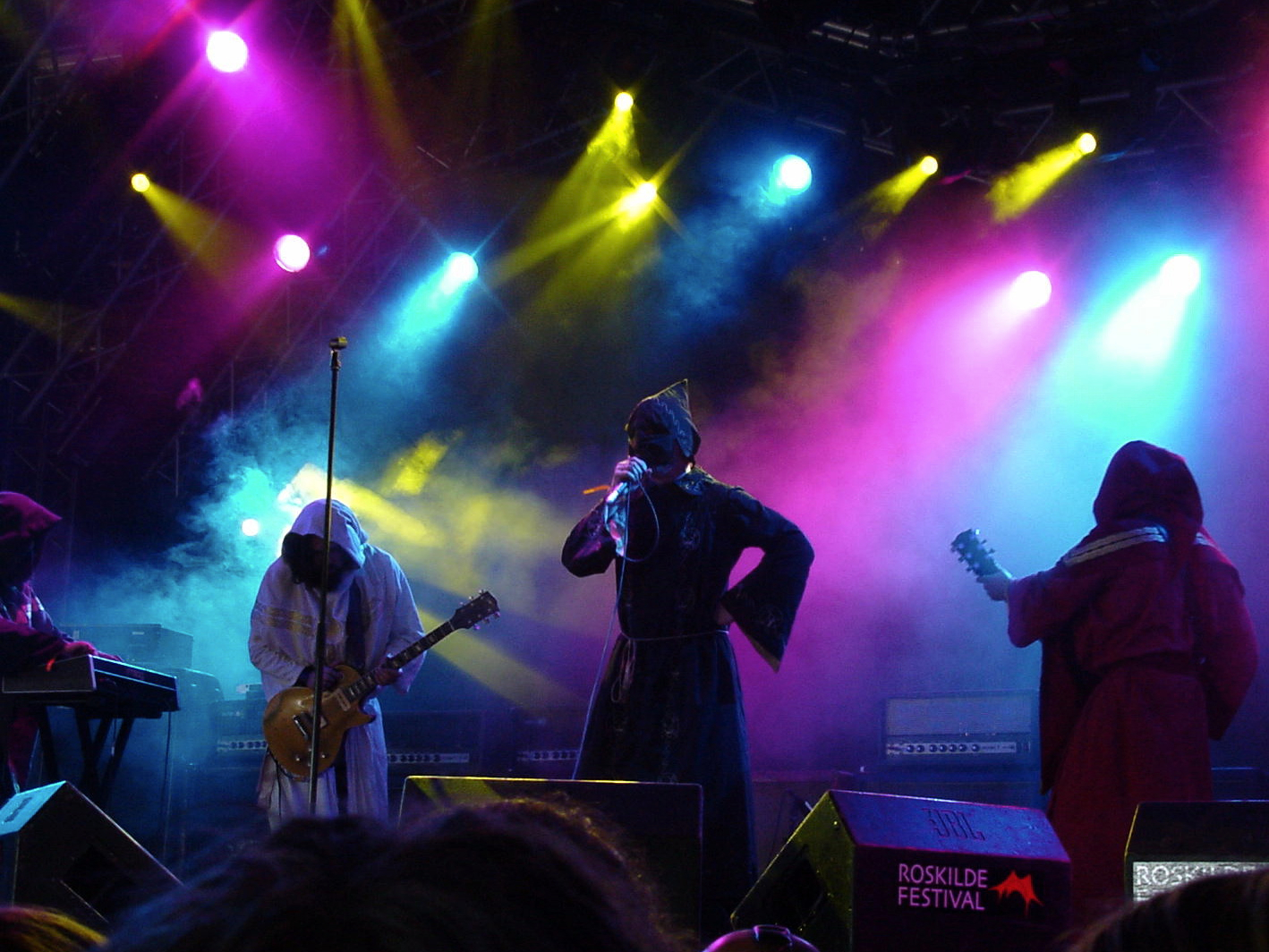
- Sunn O))) performing at the 2005 Roskilde Festival

Background information
- Origin: Seattle, Washington, U.S.
- Genres: Drone metal; doom metal; experimental metal; black metal; dark ambient
- Years active: 1998–present
- Labels: Southern Lord; Sub Pop Records
- Members: Stephen O'Malley; Greg Anderson
- Past members: Joe Preston; Attila Csihar; Daniel O'Sullivan; G. Stuart Dahlquist
- Website: sunn.southernlord.com

Sunn O))) (pronounced "sun") is an American drone metal band formed in 1998 in Seattle, Washington. The band is known for its distinctive visual style and slow, heavy sound, which blends diverse genres including doom metal, drone, black metal, and dark ambient, as well as for their extremely loud live performances.

The band's core members are Stephen O'Malley (also of Khanate and Burning Witch) and Greg Anderson (of Goatsnake and Engine Kid).

== History ==
=== Origins & ØØ Void (1998–2000) ===
Sunn O))) is named after the Sunn amplifier brand, the logo of which includes a circle next to the "sunn" banner with waves heading off to the right. In interviews, Stephen O'Malley stated that the band's name was also chosen as a play on the name Earth, a band widely regarded as pioneers of drone metal throughout the 1990s. Before the band members moved to Los Angeles, they briefly used the name Mars.

The band releases the majority of its music through the label it founded in 1998, Southern Lord Records. However, the band initially released its first studio album, ØØ Void, on multiple labels, including Rise Above Records, Hydra Head Records, and Dirter Productions (which pressed it as a double album on vinyl). Additionally, the original pressing of The Grimmrobe Demos was released by Hydra Head Records. It was later issued as a double picture record set by Outlaw Recordings and finally reissued by Southern Lord in 2004.

Hungarian-born Attila Csihar (of Mayhem) has performed live with the band as their primary vocalist since 2003.

=== Early releases (2002–2006) ===
On March 4, 2002, the band released their second studio album, Flight of the Behemoth.

The following year on April 22, 2003, the band released their third studio album, White1. This release was quickly followed by the subsequent album, White2, released on June 29, 2004. Although the two albums were released a year apart, they were recorded simultaneously, with the recordings being referred to as "The White Sessions".

On October 17, 2005, the band released Black One, their fifth studio album. The following year, the band collaborated with Japanese experimental group Boris, releasing a collaborative album, Altar, on October 31, 2006.

=== Further releases (2008–2019) ===
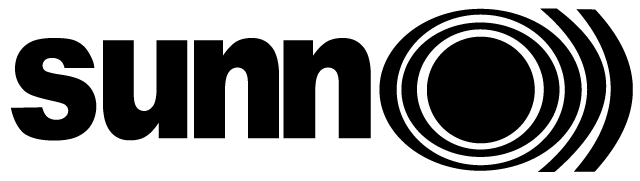
The logo the band uses is also that of the Sunn amplifier brand. Stephen O'Malley has stated the band licensed the use of the logo from Fender, the owner of the Sunn trademarks. Since then, the brand has become independent again.

On September 22, 2008, the band released a live album titled Dømkirke and also announced a mini-tour consisting of four concerts to commemorate the group's 10th anniversary, which coincided with the release of The Grimmrobe Demos. The following year, the band released their sixth studio album, Monoliths & Dimensions, on May 18, 2009.

Sunn O))) released a collaborative album with Norwegian experimental electronic band Ulver titled Terrestrials on February 3, 2014. Later in the same year, on October 21, the band released a collaborative album, Soused, with singer-songwriter Scott Walker.

In November 2015, Sunn O))) presented a four-day program at Le Guess Who? Festival in Utrecht, Netherlands, including Annette Peacock, Magma, Julia Holter and The Crazy World of Arthur Brown, and Sunn O))) itself. The following month, on December 4, the band released their seventh studio album, Kannon, with its lyrics recounting Buddhist stories.

In 2019, the band worked with producer Steve Albini on two albums, Life Metal, released on April 26, 2019, and Pyroclasts, released on October 25 of the same year.

=== Signing to Sub Pop Records & Sunn O))) (2025–present) ===
On October 14, 2025, the band announced that it had signed with Sub Pop Records. The band had previously worked with Sub Pop, releasing a single "Evil Chuck" / "Ron G. Warrior" as part of the label's 'Sub Pop's Single Series' in 2023.

On April 3, 2026, the band released its first album with Sub Pop, a self-titled release, Sunn O))). The album's release was preceded by its two singles, "Glory Black" on January 13, and "Butch's Guns" on February 19. The album's cover art features a painting by abstract painter Mark Rothko. The band went on tour around North America and Europe from March to July of 2026.

== Musical style ==
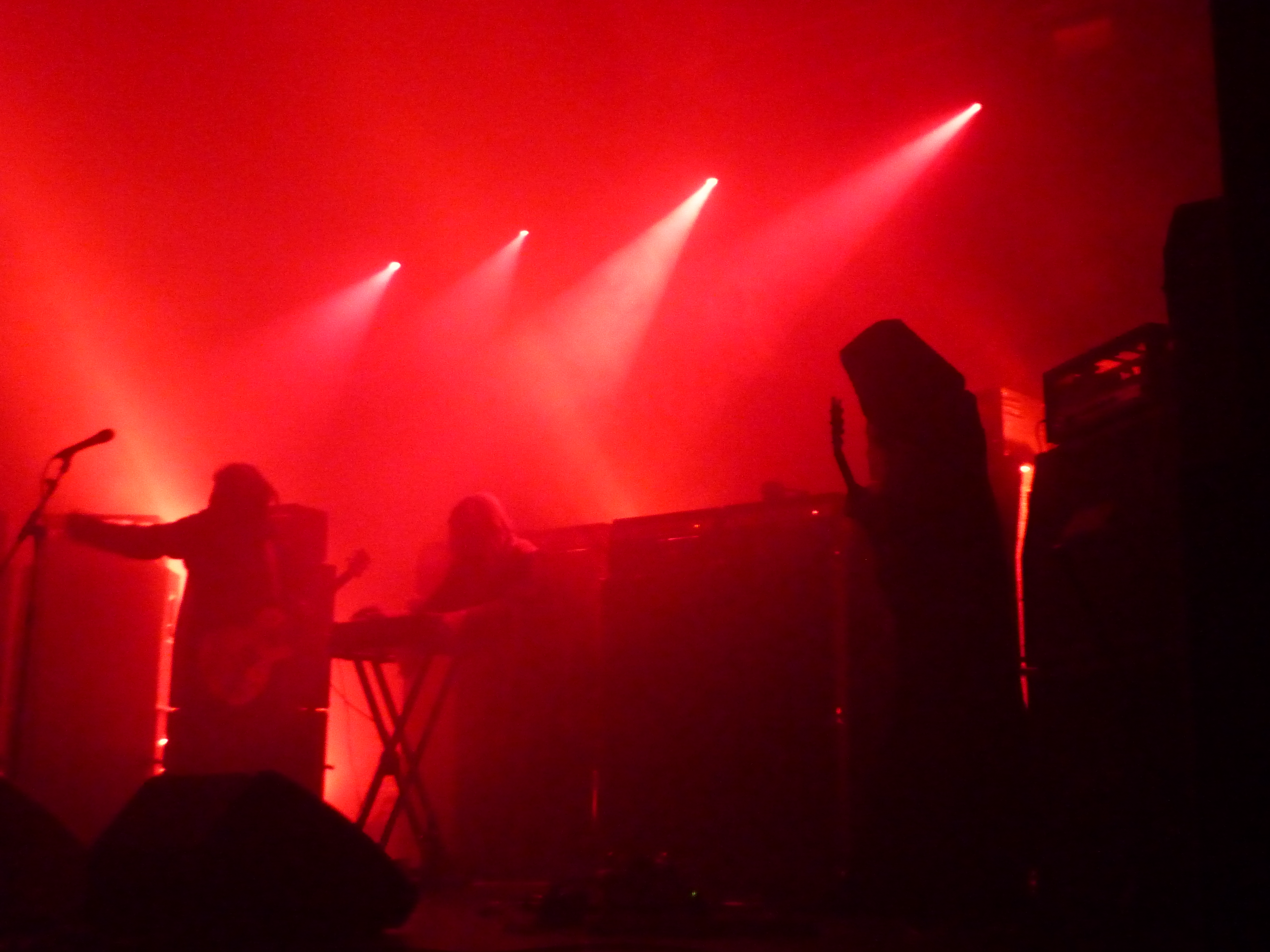
Sunn O))) on stage at the Ritz in Manchester, June 11, 2012

The band's style is characterized by slow tempos, distorted guitars, lack of rhythm and melody, and alternative tunings. The guitars are notable for their low register, frequently utilizing tunings as low as drop A. Additionally, the band is known for using resonant feedback to create monolithic soundscapes and eerie atmospheres. Percussion is rarely incorporated, with a lack of any discernible beat. When performing live, the band wears robes, fills the air with fog, and plays at a high volume. Sunn O)))'s musical style has been described as drone metal, doom metal, experimental metal, black metal, noise rock, and dark ambient.

Sunn O))) is widely regarded as leaders in the genre, including by The New York Times Magazine of May 28, 2006, when the band was written up in an article called "Heady Metal" by John Wray.

== Discography ==
=== Studio albums ===
- ØØ Void (2000)
- Flight of the Behemoth (2002)
- White1 (2003)
- White2 (2004)
- Black One (2005)
- Monoliths & Dimensions (2009)
- Kannon (2015)
- Life Metal (2019)
- Pyroclasts (2019)
- Sunn O))) (2026)

=== Collaborative albums ===
- Altar (with Boris) (2006)
- Terrestrials (with Ulver) (2014)
- Soused (with Scott Walker) (2014)
