= The Amur River: Between Russia and China =

2021 book by Colin Thubron

The Amur River
- First edition
- Author: Colin Thubron
- Language: English
- Genre: Travel literature
- Publisher: Harper Press
- Publication date: September 21, 2021
- Publication place: Mongolia & Russia & China
- Media type: Print (hardcover & paperback & e-book)
- Pages: 320
- ISBN: 978-0063099685

The Amur River: Between Russia and China is a 2021 book by Colin Thubron. It is an account of his travel from Mongolia to Russia to China, mostly along the Amur River.

== Content ==
The book recounts author Colin Thubron's account of spending nearly two years traveling along the Amur River, from source to sea.

The river, which is over 2800 miles long goes by different names in each of the countries it flows through. Known as the Onon in northern Mongolia (where it is deemed sacred by the local horsemen), it becomes Shilka in Siberia and is called the Heilongjiang, or Black Dragon River in China. The author follows the river until it ends up in the Pacific at the Sea of Okhotsk.

"The book is more the story of the river and its people, with the author’s travels woven into the story, rather than a justification for the writer’s travels."

This is the author's 10th travel book. His travel writing has mostly been focusing on the previous USSR and China regions. In the past, Thubron has written astutely of political borders, ethnic realities and nationhood before, notably in his 2006 Shadow of the Silk Road."

== Route Taken by the Author ==
Route taken by Colin Thubron in The Amur River
Travel route through Mongolia, Russia & China

== Reviews and Acclaim ==
- In its review of the book, the Spectator praises this book by concluding that "Thubron, having seen and reflected, has distilled his observations into a volume that will outlive Cassandras, post-Soviet gangsters and every smuggler who ever stacked a raft."
- The Washington Post included it in its Best Travel Books of 2021 list, claiming that this "evocative book [...] sweeps readers into a landscape that Thubron — a meticulous researcher — enriches with history and his own decades of voyaging through the region."
- Wanderlust included this book in its list of The Best Travel Books for 2021 calling it, "a powerful, relevant tale worthy of his very best work."
- The NY Times book review published on September 24, 2021, was more critical of the book, claiming that Thubron "... shies from making connections of any sort between the world through which he travels and the one in which we live as if the places he explores exist on some other planet."
