= Indonesia Raya (disambiguation) =

Indonesia Raya is the national anthem of Indonesia. The term Indonesia Raya can also refer to one of the following:

- Greater Indonesia, a political concept known as Indonesia Raya in Indonesian
- Indonesia Raya (newspaper), a defunct Indonesian newspaper
