= Indonesian Grand Prix (disambiguation) =

The Indonesian Grand Prix was an open-wheel racing car motor race.

Indonesia Grand Prix, Grand Prix of Indonesia, Grand Prix Indonesia, Indonesian Grand Prix, may also refer to:

- Indonesian motorcycle Grand Prix in MotoGP and associated support races
- A1 Grand Prix of Indonesia, in A1 GP car racing and associated support races
  - 2006–07 A1 Grand Prix of Nations, Indonesia
  - 2005–06 A1 Grand Prix of Nations, Indonesia

== See also ==
- Jakarta ePrix, Formula-E grand prix in Jakara, the capital of Indonesia
