= Mountains of the Mind =

2003 book by Robert Macfarlane

- Author: Robert Macfarlane
- Language: English
- Subject: Geography
- Genre: Non-fiction
- Publisher: Granta Books
- Publication date: 8 May 2003
- Publication place: United Kingdom
- Media type: Print (hardcover and paperback)
- Pages: 306 pp (hardcover 1st ed)
- ISBN: 9781862075610 (hardcover 1st ed)
- Followed by: The Wild Places

Mountains of the Mind: A History of a Fascination is a book by British writer Robert Macfarlane published in 2003 about the Eurocentric history of human fascination with mountains. The book takes its title from a line by the poet Gerard Manley Hopkins and combines history with first-person narrative. He considers why people are drawn to mountains despite their obvious dangers, and examines the powerful, and sometimes fatal, hold that mountains can come to have over the imagination.

The book's heroes include the mountaineer George Mallory, and its influences include the writing of Simon Schama and Francis Spufford. In the end, Macfarlane criticizes Mallory for devoting more time to the mountain than his wife and notes that he has personally sworn off high-risk mountaineering. The New York Times's John Rothchild praised the book, writing "There's fascinating stuff here, and a clever premise, but Mountains of the Mind may cause recovering climbaholics to trace their addiction to their early homework assignments and file class-action lawsuits against their poetry teachers."

== Awards ==
Mountains of the Mind won the Guardian First Book Award and the Somerset Maugham Award.

Awards and Nominations
Year	Award	Result	Ref
2003	Boardman Tasker Prize for Mountain Literature	Nominated	
2003	Guardian First Book Award	Won	
2004	Somerset Maugham Award	Won	
2004	Sunday Times/Peters Fraser + Dunlop Young Writer of the Year Award	Won	
