= In Siberia =

1999 book by Colin Thubron

- Author: Colin Thubron
- Language: English
- Subject: Siberia
- Genre: Travel book
- Published: London
- Publisher: Chatto & Windus, Vintage (2008)
- Publication date: 1999
- Publication place: United Kingdom
- Media type: Paperback
- Pages: 286

In Siberia is a 1999 travel book by the English writer Colin Thubron. Published in 1999, the book depicts Thubron's journeys in Siberia in the late 1990s, after the fall of communism. The book is the last of what is regarded as Thubron's "Russia trilogy", comprising Among the Russians (1983), The Lost Heart of Asia (1994) and In Siberia (1999). The book was widely praised by critics. Jan Morris, Kazuo Ishiguro and Anthony Sattin selected it as one of their books of the year.
