= John Gimlette =

English journalist and author

John Gimlette is an English barrister and author of travel literature. He has written six books, and written articles for newspapers and magazines and contributed to BBC travel programmes.

== Biography ==
Born in 1963, at the age of 17 Gimlette crossed the former Soviet Union by train, and has now travelled to more than 60 countries. He has combined a legal career with travelling and writing.

He has published six books to date: At The Tomb Of The Inflatable Pig: Travels through Paraguay (2004), Theatre Of Fish: Travels through Newfoundland and Labrador (2005), Panther Soup: A European Journey in War and Peace (2008), Wild Coast: Travels on South America's Untamed Edge (2011), Elephant Complex: Travels in Sri Lanka (2015), and Garden of Mars: Madagascar, an Island Story (2021).

Jorge Antonio Halke Arévalos is a character in At The Tomb Of The Inflatable Pig. After the book was published he was killed in a dispute in 2005.

== Awards and honours ==
- 2012 Dolman Best Travel Book Award, winner, Wild Coast: Travels on South America's Untamed Edge
