= To a Mountain in Tibet =

2011 book by Colin Thubron

- Author: Colin Thubron
- Language: English
- Subject: Travel literature Autobiography
- Genre: Nonfiction
- Published: 1 March 2011
- Publisher: Chatto & Windus/Harper
- Publication place: United Kingdom/United States
- Media type: Hardcover
- Pages: 240
- ISBN: 978-0099532644

To a Mountain in Tibet is a nonfiction book by British travel writer Colin Thubron describing his journey to Mount Kailash through a remote region of Nepal and Tibet.

== Background ==
The book chronicles the author's travels, who sets out on foot from Humla District of Nepal with a cook, a guide, and a horseman. After initially following the course of the Karnali River, the team heads in the direction of the Nalakankar Himal and enters Tibet.

== Reception ==
Sara Wheeler writing for The Guardian, "To a Mountain in Tibet offers no redemption and no conclusion. Instead, it is an elegy for everything that makes us human. You can't ask more of a book than that, can you?"

Writing for The Wall Street Journal, Alice Albinia says, "Mr. Thubron has spent four decades writing in forceful and respectful ways of foreign lands, and 'To a Mountain in Tibet' is no exception."
