= Indonesia, Etc. =

Indonesia, Etc.: Exploring the Improbable Nation
- First US edition
- Author: Elizabeth Pisani
- Language: English
- Subject: Indonesia
- Genre: Travel
- Published: 23 June 2014, W. W. Norton Company
- Media type: Hardcover, Paperback, Audio book, E-Book
- ISBN: 0-393-35127-0; 978-0393351279

Indonesia, Etc.: Exploring the Improbable Nation is a 2014 travel book by epidemiologist and former journalist Elizabeth Pisani. It follows her travels throughout Indonesia in 2012 and 2013. It received generally favourable critical reviews.

== Synopsis ==
Pisani visits Sumba, Flores, Sulawesi, the Maluku Islands, Sumatra, Kalimantan, and Java. She mostly visits smaller cities and villages, most of which see few tourists. Along the way, she discusses recent Indonesian history, culture, politics, and economics, as well as the logistics of her trip and the people she meets during it.

Among the themes of the book are the conflict between Java (which has 60% of the population of Indonesia) and the rest of the country. According to Pisani, the Indonesian elite is dominated by the Javanese, especially those from Jakarta, and so Java dominates the outside image of Indonesia. As an attempt to counter this bias, Pisani spends most of her time on other, smaller islands.

== Reception ==
Indonesia, Etc. received generally favorable reviews, and was listed among the best non-fiction books of the year by The Economist and by The Wall Street Journal. The Guardian gave Indonesia, Etc. a positive review, describing it as "project[ing] a more optimistic and warmer picture of a fascinating country than most outside commentators". On the other hand, The New York Times gave a generally negative review, noting that "the book does not really grapple with Java or several of the other populous Indonesian islands".
