= Colin Thubron =

British travel writer and novelist (born 1939)

Colin Thubron CBE, FRSL
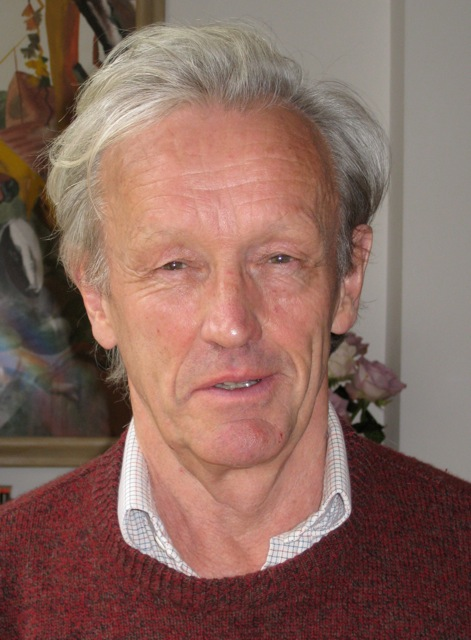
- Thubron in 2010
- Born: Colin Gerald Dryden Thubron; 14 June 1939 (age 87); London, England
- Education: Eton College
- Occupations: Travel writer and novelist
- Notable work: A Cruel Madness (1985); Behind the Wall: A Journey Through China (1987) In Siberia (1999); The Amur River: Between Russia and China (2021)
- Spouse: Margreta de Grazia
- Parent(s): Gerald Thubron and Evelyn (née Dryden)
- Awards: PEN/Macmillan Silver Pen Award; Hawthornden Prize; Edward Stanford Outstanding Contribution to Travel Writing Award; Lifetime Achievement Award, Premio Chatwin, Italy

Colin Gerald Dryden Thubron (born 14 June 1939) is a British travel writer and novelist. In 2008, The Times ranked him among the 50 greatest postwar British writers. He is a contributor to The New York Review of Books, The Times, The Times Literary Supplement and The New York Times. His books have been translated into more than twenty languages. Thubron was appointed a Commander of the Order of the British Empire (CBE) in the 2007 New Year Honours. He is a Fellow and, between 2009 and 2017, was President of the Royal Society of Literature.

== Early years ==
Thubron is the son of Brigadier Gerald Thubron and of Evelyn (née Dryden), a collateral descendant of the poet John Dryden and of Samuel Morse, inventor of the Morse Code. Thubron was born in London, England, and was educated at Eton College. Before becoming a writer, he worked for five years in publishing in London and New York City, and made independent documentary films that were shown on BBC television. He is married to the Shakespeare scholar Margreta de Grazia.

== The Middle East ==
Thubron's first travel book, Mirror to Damascus, was published in 1967, the first such book on the city for a century. It was followed the next year by The Hills of Adonis: A Quest in Lebanon, a lyrical account of a journey through the country, pre-civil war, and the next year by Jerusalem. While starting a parallel career as a novelist, he completed a travel book on Cyprus, Journey into Cyprus, in 1974, just before Turkey invaded the island.

== Russia and the Far East ==
In 1981, during the Brezhnev era, Thubron broke with his earlier work (on cities and small countries) and travelled by car into the Soviet Union, a journey recorded in Among the Russians. This was followed in 1987 by Behind the Wall: A Journey Through China (winner of the Hawthornden Prize and the Thomas Cook Travel Book Award), and in 1994 by The Lost Heart of Asia, the record of a journey through the newly independent nations of Central Asia.

In 1999, his book In Siberia (Prix Bouvier, France), an exploration of the farthest reaches of the ex-Soviet Union, was published. In an episode of the BBC Radio 4 programme Bookclub in 2018, Thubron discussed the book with the presenter James Naughtie and answered questions from the audience. His 2007 book Shadow of the Silk Road describes a 7,000-mile journey from China to the Mediterranean encompassing cultures in which Thubron has been particularly interested: Islam, China, the former Soviet Union, Central Asia, Afghanistan, Iran and Turkey. His latest work is The Amur River: Between Russia and China (2021).

== Writing ==
Most of Thubron's novels are notably different from his travel books. Several describe settings of enforced immobility: a psychiatric hospital, a prison, an amnesiac's mind. Notable among them are Emperor (1978), a study of the conversion of Constantine, A Cruel Madness (winner of the PEN/Macmillan Silver Pen Award), and Falling (1989). Others, however, use travel or a fictional abroad: Turning Back the Sun (1991) and an imaginary journey to Vilcabamba, Peru, in To the Last City (2002), long-listed for the Man Booker Prize. It has been described as a "Heart of Darkness narrative" in a "Marquezian setting". His 2016 novel, Night of Fire, is his most ambitious yet: a multi-layered study of time and memory, which several reviewers named his masterpiece.

Thubron says that he was influenced by Palgrave's Golden Treasury as a schoolboy, and was initially inspired by the travel writing of Patrick Leigh Fermor, Jan Morris and Freya Stark. Thubron admires the English novelist William Golding and chose Victor Gollancz's anthology A Year of Grace (1950) as his book for Desert Island Discs.

=== Travel writing ===
- Mirror to Damascus – Heinemann, 1967
- The Hills of Adonis: A Quest in Lebanon – Heinemann, 1968
- Jerusalem – Heinemann, 1969
- Journey into Cyprus – Heinemann, 1975
- Jerusalem – Time-Life, 1976
- Istanbul – Time-Life, 1978
- The Venetians – Time-Life, 1980
- The Ancient Mariners – Time-Life, 1981
- The Royal Opera House, Covent Garden – Hamish Hamilton, 1982
- Among the Russians – Heinemann, 1983
- Where Nights Are Longest: Travels by Car Through Western Russia – Atlantic Monthly Press, 1984
- Behind the Wall: A Journey through China – Heinemann, 1987
- The Silk Road: Beyond the Celestial Kingdom – Simon & Schuster, 1989
- The Lost Heart of Asia – Heinemann, 1994
- In Siberia – Chatto & Windus, 1999
- Shadow of the Silk Road, Chatto & Windus, 2006
- To a Mountain in Tibet, Chatto & Windus, 2011
- The Amur River: Between Russia and China, Chatto & Windus, 2021

Forewords:

- Views from Abroad: The Spectator Book of Travel Writing, edited by Philip Marsden-Smedley & Jeffrey Klinke – Grafton, 1988
- The Lycian Shore by Freya Stark – John Murray, 2002
- The Road to Oxiana by Robert Byron – Penguin, 2007
- Stalin's Nose – by Rory MacLean – Tauris Parke, 2008
- The Travels of Marco Polo – Everyman, 2008
- Art, Life and Everything – by Julie Umerle – Susak Press, 2019
- The Broken Road, edited with Artemis Cooper - by Patrick Leigh Fermor - John Murray, 2013

=== Novels ===
- The God in the Mountain – Heinemann, 1977
- Emperor – Heinemann, 1978
- A Cruel Madness – Heinemann, 1984
- Falling – Heinemann, 1989
- Turning Back the Sun – Heinemann, 1991
- Distance – Heinemann, 1996
- To the Last City – Chatto & Windus, 2002
- Night of Fire – Chatto & Windus, 2016
- Passage - Chatto & Windus, 2026

=== Radio adaptations, stage and television ===
- Emperor – BBC Radio 4, September 1984, with Martin Jarvis as Constantine and Juliet Stevenson as Fausta.
- Great Journeys: The Silk Road – BBC 2 Television, presenter, 1989
- The Prince of the Pagodas – ballet scenario, the Royal Opera House, 1989, choreographed by Kenneth MacMillan
- A Cruel Madness – BBC Radio 4, May 1992, with Robert Glenister as Pashley and Harriet Walter as Sophia
- The South Bank Show – Time seen as a Road, on Colin Thubron, ITV television, 1992

== Prizes and awards ==
- 1967: Book Society Choice, Mirror to Damascus
- 1969: Fellow of the Royal Society of Literature
- 1985: PEN/Macmillan Silver Pen Award, A Cruel Madness
- 1988: Hawthornden Prize, Behind the Wall: A journey through China
- 1988: Thomas Cook Travel Book Award, Behind the Wall: A Journey through China
- 1991: Fellow of the Royal Asiatic Society
- 2000: Mungo Park Medal of the Royal Scottish Geographical Society
- 2001: Lawrence of Arabia Memorial Medal of the Royal Society for Asian Affairs
- 2002: Hon.D Lit University of Warwick
- 2003–9: Vice-president, The Royal Society of Literature
- 2007: Commander of the Order of the British Empire (CBE), New Year's Honours
- 2008: Society of Authors Travel Award
- 2009–2017: President, The Royal Society of Literature
- 2010: Prix Bouvier, France, In Siberia
- 2011: Ness Award of the Royal Geographical Society
- 2014: International Prize, Spanish Geographical Society
- 2019: Edward Stanford Outstanding Contribution to Travel Writing Award
- 2020: RSL Companion of Literature
- 2021: Lifetime Achievement Award, Premio Chatwin, Italy
- 2021: Stanford Dolman Travel Book of the Year: The Amur River: Between Russia and China
- 2023: Travel Book of the Year, Premio Chatwin, Italy: The Amur River
