= The Wild Places (book) =

2007 book by Robert Macfarlane

- Author: Robert Macfarlane
- Subject: Geography
- Genre: Non-fiction
- Publisher: Penguin Books
- Publication date: 2007
- Media type: Print (hardcover and paperback)
- Pages: 340
- Awards: Boardman Tasker Prize for Mountain Literature
- ISBN: 978-1-86207-941-0
- Preceded by: Mountains of the Mind
- Followed by: The Old Ways

The Wild Places is a 2007 book by British writer Robert Macfarlane about the author's journey to explore and document the remaining wilderness of the British Isles. The book is separated into 15 chapters, each a description of Macfarlane's journey to a particular type of wild place, such as "Island", "Valley", and "Moor".
