= For Love or Money =

For Love or Money may refer to:

== Film and theatre ==
- For Love or Money, an 1870 stage comedy written by Andrew Halliday
- For Love or Money, a 1903 stage comedy in three acts written by Helen Sherman Griffith
- For Love or Money (play), a 1947 Broadway play by F. Hugh Herbert
- For Love or Money (1920 film), an American drama film directed by Burton L. King
- For Love or Money (1930 film), an early talkie short starring Lois Wilson
- For Love or Money, an alternative title for the 1933 film Cash
- For Love or Money (1939 film), a film starring June Lang
- For Love or Money (1963 film), a film starring Kirk Douglas
- For Love or Money (1983 film), a film about women and work in Australia
- For Love or Money (1984 film), a TV movie featuring Jamie Farr
- For Love or Money (1993 film), a film starring Michael J. Fox
- For Love or Money (2014 film), a film starring Liu Yifei and Rain
- For Love or Money (2019 film), a film starring Robert Kazinsky

== Television ==
- For Love or Money (Australian TV program), a 1987–1989 Australian antiques television program presented by Clive Hale
- For Love or Money (American TV series), a 2003–2004 American reality series aired on NBC
- For Love or Money (Philippine TV series), a 2013–2014 Philippine drama series
- For Love or Money (game show), a 1958–1959 American game show that was broadcast on CBS
- "For Love or Money", an episode of Crime Story
- "For Love or Money", an episode of Dallas
- "For Love or Money", an episode of Dr. Vegas
- "For Love or Money" (Falcon Crest), an episode of Falcon Crest
- "For Love or Money", an episode of Law & Order
- "For Love or Money", an episode of MacGyver
- "For Love or Money", an episode of Night Court
- "For Love or Money", an episode of What I Like About You
- "For Love or Money", an episode of Wildfire
- "For Love or Money", a two-part episode of WKRP in Cincinnati

== Literature ==
- For Love or Money, a Pictorial History of Women and Work in Australia (1983) by Thornley, Oliver and McMurchy
- For Love or Money, a 1995 novel in The Nancy Drew Files series
- For Love or Money, a 1967 novel by Tim Jeal
- For Money or Love, a 1976 book by Robin Lloyd

== Music ==
- "For Love or Money", a song from the 1956 Broadway musical Happy Hunting
- "For Love or Money", a song by Roger Limb on the 1979 compilation album BBC Radiophonic Workshop – 21
- "Love or Money", a song by Joni Mitchell from Miles of Aisles

== See also ==
- Love and Money (disambiguation)
- For the Love of Money (disambiguation)
- Love v Money (disambiguation)
- For Love & Money, a 1989 book by Jonathan Raban
- Love of money
