= Waxwings (novel) =

2003 novel by Jonathan Raban

- First US edition
- Author: Jonathan Raban
- Publisher: Picador (UK); Pantheon Books (US)
- Publication date: September 30, 2003
- ISBN: 0-375-41008-2
- OCLC: 51817520
- Dewey Decimal: 823/.914 21
- LC Class: PR6068.A22 W39 2003

Waxwings (2003) is the second novel by Jonathan Raban

== Ideas for the novel ==
Raban muses over the idea for a Seattle-based novel near the end of his American road trip in Hunting Mister Heartbreak. Whilst sailing on Lake Union, he portrays himself as a fictional writer called Rainbird who, in toying with the idea for a novel, invents a character called Woon Soo Rhee. Woon Soo Rhee materializes as Chick in Waxwings:

Rainbird was keen on Woon Soo. His face would be a reef-knot of bunched muscle. His furious hands would fill the gaps of his fractured, F.O.B. American English. His body would be like the kind of steel spring that tough guys use to strengthen their hands. Woon Soo would be a creature of tragic aggression. (p. 361)

The main themes running through the novel are Tom Janeaway's parental love for his son, the bubble of the Internet boom, and the characters' mistaken identities. Janeaway himself is confused about his own British identity, reverting unconsciously into a strong Hungarian accent whenever he speaks to his mother over the telephone. Likewise, his wife mistakes him for being an academic bookworm, out of touch with reality as he contemplates his Victorian literature, whereas in fact he foresees the impending collapse of the over-inflated Internet ventures, and penetratingly compares Beth's Internet company boss, Steve Litvinof and his wife, to the brash Mr and Mrs Veneering in Dickens' Our Mutual Friend. Tom is even mistaken for a child abductor whilst mulling over his novel during his walk along the Slough. Shiva Ray is supposed to be a powerful international businessman interested in donating money to the UW creative writing programme but in fact he turns out to be a hoaxer – probably some out-of-work Silicon programmer with an enthusiasm for literature. Paul Nagel, the detective on the Hayley abduction case, it not quite the tough detective he appears when he reveals to Tom that he is a scriptwriter in his spare time. And even Chick, outwardly the hard-nosed Chinese immigrant seeking to make his fortune in America, reveals his soft side when he gives Finn a small puppy and laughs uproariously at Jack Lemmon's role in Some Like It Hot.

== The title ==
Jonathan Raban's title refers to a type of bird.

Waxwings are sleek, gregarious birds that migrate all around Europe and North America, living on insects in summer and berries in winter. Their only appearance in this book comes at the very end, when the sudden descent of a flock into his garden greatly excites Tom Janeway. He even calls his young son Finn to come and see. Finn is unimpressed. "Can I go get a cookie now?" he asks, while his father reaches for a bird book. When the scene closes, so does the novel.

Raban himself speaks about the title and its relevance to his theme in an interview:

" ... the book was actually named for the birds ... They're fascinating to watch. They descend, in a huge flock, on a berry tree and gorge themselves until the tree is stripped bare. Some of them get so drunk on the berries that they fall out of the trees, too heavy to fly. You see them lying on their backs, sozzled out of their tiny minds with their feet waving in the air. Then suddenly the flock recomposes and moves on to pillage the next tree. This, I thought, is the settlement of the West in miniature ... it seemed perfect as an analogy for what people were doing with Seattle during the dot-com movement: these birds, as it were, migrating from gold rush to gold rush, getting high, falling out of the tree, waving their feet around, getting up, moving on."

== Sources ==
Waxwings, Jonathan Raban, ISBN 0-375-41008-2
