= Pål Refsdal =

Norwegian journalist

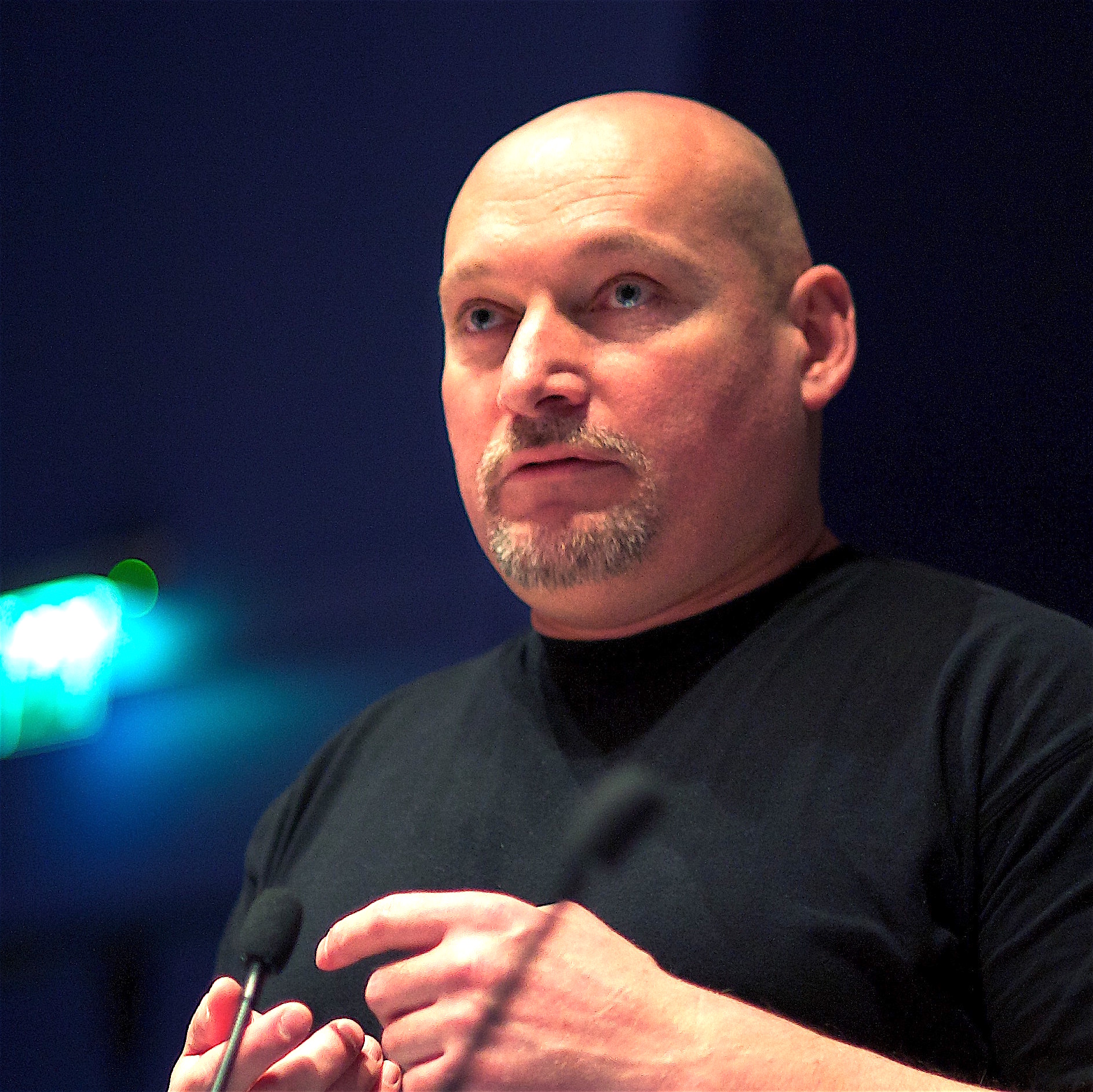
Pål Refsdal in 2010

Pål Refsdal (born 9 September 1963) is a Norwegian freelance journalist, photographer and filmmaker who has reported from many war zones. He has followed and worked with several rebel groups. In 2009, he was embedded with Taliban in Afghanistan where he was taken captive and held for a week before he was released. He has also worked for Norwegian People's Aid and as press officer for the Norwegian military.

== Early life and education ==
Refsdal was born in Kongsvinger to a father from Hedmark who is a doctor and a German mother who is a physiotherapist. He has three sisters. The family lived in Sweden for five years and later moved to Ulsrud in Oslo, where Refsdal spent most of his adolescence. He finished the Norwegian Army Officer School in 1983, aged 19 with the rank of Second Lieutenant.

== 1980s ==
In 1985, he followed the Mujahideens in Afghanistan and took part in attacks against Soviet forces in the Soviet-Afghan war. He there also met the British writer Jason Elliot who would later describe their encounter in the 1999 book An Unexpected Light: Travels in Afghanistan. In 1986, he worked with Tamil separatists. In the 1980s, Refsdal reported from several guerrilla groups in Latin-America, including the Guatemalan National Revolutionary Unity and the Shining Path in Peru.

He collaborated with the Kosovo Liberation Army (Albanian: Ushtria Çlirimtare e Kosovës—UÇK) in 1999, and spent 3 months in the hospital after having been hit during an attack by the Yugoslav People's Army. Norway's foreign minister at the time Knut Vollebæk met with the Yugoslavian foreign minister to help get Refsdal out of the area. After coming back to Norway, Refsdal returned to Kosovo some months later.

== Angola case ==
In 1995 he worked for six months with mine clearing operations in Angola for Norwegian People's Aid. He subsequently accused the organisation of having employees who were involved in drugs and sexual abuse. His wife, who visited Angola in the summer of 1996, stated that a young girl in Angola accused a leader in the Norwegian People's Aid of having engaged in sexual activities with her. The prosecutor in Oslo did not find reason to investigate the case. Refsdal went back to Angola to collect evidence of misconduct according for himself. The Norwegian People's Aid then reported him to the authorities for allegedly attempting to hire a hitman to kill three employees in the organisation. Refsdal was investigated in Norway and briefly put in a cell, but not prosecuted. He sued the Norwegian People's Aid for libel in Oslo and won the case in 2001, receiving a compensation of 50,000 Norwegian kroner.

== 2009 Afghanistan kidnapping and documentary film ==
In 2009, Refsdal via his production company Refsdal media, received 700,000 Norwegian kroner from the Norwegian Film Institute to produce a film about the daily life of Taliban for Novemberfilm. The planned title was Den andre siden (Norwegian for 'The other side'). He stayed with a group of around ten Taliban soldiers in the Kunar Province for nine days in October of that year to gather material for the film. There he filmed attacks against American tanks, although he had been warned by the Norwegian Ministry of Foreign Affairs about entering the area.

In November, Refsdal and his Afghan interpreter again entered the Kunar province to embed with another Taliban group. On 5 November, Refsdal was told that he was suspected of being a spy. He was then threatened with being executed that same evening, but his kidnappers also stated that the situation might be solved by a ransom, a prisoner exchange or Refsdal converting to Islam. The kidnappers originally demanded a ransom of 500,000 US Dollars.

On 6 November, the kidnappers allowed Refsdal to talk to the Norwegian embassy in Afghanistan to discuss a ransom, as well as with Al Jazeera. The same day, Refsdal converted to Islam.

On 12 November 2009, Refsdal was released. The Norwegian Foreign Ministry, who had been active in the negotiation with Taliban, denied that any ransom had been paid. About 100 people in the Norwegian Ministry of Foreign Affairs, the Norwegian police and the Norwegian defense worked to get Refsdal free. The department considered demanding that Refsdal pay part of the expenses, but decided against such a demand.

Novemberfilm's documentary on Refsdal's experience in Afghanistan Fanget av Taliban (Norwegian for 'Captured by Taliban') was shown on NRK in 2010. The film alleged that Norwegian authorities had been prepared to pay a ransom. The Norwegian Ministry of Foreign Affairs stated that talks about ransom had only been a tactical move on their part, and not anything they had seriously considered to pay. The Ministry filed a complaint about the program to the Norwegian Press Complaints Commission as they stated the documentary revealed details about the Ministry's handling of the case and negotiations with Taliban that could make it difficult for the ministry to help in the same way in the future. The Press Complaints Commission found that NRK and Novemberfilm had acted wrongly.

A somewhat different international version of the documentary Taliban: Behind the Masks was broadcast by CNN in 2010 as part of a series on the Taliban.

He was nominated for the Rory Peck Award for his film in 2010. The CNN series Taliban which Refsdal contributed to was awarded the National Headliner Awards in the Documentary or Series of Reports on the Same Subject in 2011.

His book Geriljareporteren (Norwegian for 'The guerrilla reporter') was also published in 2010; telling the story about his Afghanistan experience and his other involvements with guerrilla groups he has had as a journalist.

== 2013 Syria ==
In the summer of 2013, Refsdal lived for six weeks with Muslim rebel fighters of mainly foreign background in Syria. He described the rebels as sympathetic and having a strong religious vocation, while their military training was relatively amateurish.

== Personal life ==
Refsdal has three children from two different mothers; one from Angola and one from Puerto Rico. He remained a Muslim after he was released in 2009.

== Books ==
- Pål Refsdal (2010) Geriljareporteren. Gyldendal. Oslo. ISBN 9788281880931

== See also ==
- Embedded journalism
- List of solved missing person cases (post-2000)
