= Love and Money =

Love and Money may refer to:

- Love and Money (band), a Scottish rock/soul/funk band
- Love and Money (album), an album by Eddie Money
- Love and Money (film), a 1982 drama
- Love and Money (play), a play by Dennis Kelly
- Love & Money, an American TV sitcom
- "Love and Money" (You Rang, M'Lord?), a 1990 television episode
- "Love and Money", a song by Bronski Beat from the album The Age of Consent (album)

== See also ==
- For the Love of Money (disambiguation)
- For Love or Money (disambiguation)
- Love v Money (disambiguation)
- For Love & Money
- Love of money
