= Picador (disambiguation) =

A picador is one of the two horsemen in a Spanish bullfight.

Picador may also refer to:

- The Picador (film), a 1932 French drama
- Picador (imprint), a British publishing brand
- Picador (Picasso), 1889, his earliest extant painting
- Vincent Picador, an early 1950s aircraft engine
- "The Picadore", an 1889 march by American composer John Philip Sousa

== See also ==
- Picador Travel Classics, a 1990s series of travel literature re-prints
