= Foreign Land =

Foreign Land may refer to:

- Foreign Land (film), a 1996 Brazilian action film
- Foreign Land (novel), a novel by Jonathan Raban
- "Foreign Land" (song), a song by Eskimo Joe
