= For Love & Money =

1987 book by Jonathan Raban

- First edition
- Author: Jonathan Raban
- Publisher: Collins Harvill
- Publication date: 1987
- ISBN: 0-002-72279-8
- OCLC: 28865751

For Love & Money: Writing, Reading, Travelling, 1968 - 1987 is a book by Jonathan Raban. As the author states in the opening chapter, it is partly a collection of case-histories of his writing career over twenty years as a professional writer (with the book being dedicated to his parents, Peter and Monica Raban).

== Plot summary ==
I - II

Raban describes his development as a writer from his early youthful love for books to a university career lecturing on Literature to his final decision to become a full-time writer in London, starting out as a professional book reviewer for the London Magazine and the New Statesman.

The first part is mainly composed of book reviews he wrote for various literary journals and his subjects include: living in London, the Romantic poet Byron, Thackeray, Henry Mayhew, a well-researched piece on Anthony Trollope (although it is a pity there is so little of the writer's thoughts on his great masterpiece The Way We Live Now), who still remains a highly under-rated Victorian novelist, and three penetrative pieces on Evelyn Waugh, of whom Raban is a great admirer. As he says of Waugh's diaries, there is no clear division from the youthful into the adult Waugh and this element of youthfulness always maintained a strong influence on his writing:

'This disconcerting, sometimes vengeful, sometimes pathetic, childishness gives all Waugh's writing an odd innocence, a kind of brazen incorruptibility. His cult of the noble (which was much more a dream of living in a Burne-Jonesish world of sunlit castles and pure chivalry than it was of toadying after titles), his fiercely traditionalist Catholicism, his horror of the urban proletariat, were too wide-eyed to be either dangerous or mean. His sensibility had the extravagance of a brilliant child's: adult moderation never got in the say of clarity. When he admired he worshipped; when he disapproved, he was appalled. The bourgeois virtues of common sense and good manners (the besetting vices of so many modern English novelists) were totally foreign to him - not because he was a snob but because he never forgot what it was like to be a child.'

He also includes a review of Anthony Powell, rightly criticizing the first part of his memoirs, Infants of the Spring, as being,

"... a book so boring, reticent and formulaic that it would hardly be a creditable effort had it come from the hand of an idle brigadier jotting down his Notess of an Old Soldier or Tales of an Officer's Mess. Mr Powell begins by tracing his family tree back to Old King Cole and Rhys the Hoarse, constructs a complete stud book of Powells and Wells-Dymokes, then embarks, in a style of stultified discretion, on a rambling, much interrupted account of his own life."

There is a very affectionate piece about Robert Lowell, the American poet who Raban knew for the last seven years of his life. As he says of Lowell's life,

"It's a life lived in full conscience by a man of preternatural quickness and sensitivity and candour. We can all count ourselves lucky that Lowell happened to be around in our messy stretch of history; more than any other writer he got down on paper what it feels like to be normally alive in our particular snakepit."

Unfortunately for Lowell he was plagued by bouts of temporary insanity that meant periods of forced incarceration in a mental hospital once a year during an attack of mania. Throughout his life Raban comments that he remained, in the deepest sense, an unknowable man and his poetry was written in order that he could at least attempt to come to terms with himself and his own character.

III Just like the young aspiring writer in Cyril Connolly's Enemies of Promise, named Shelleyblake (a pun on the two Romantic poets) by Jonathan Raban, he too wanted to write plays. He states he first found a birth at Kestrel Films, a company set up by Tony Garnett, Ken Loach and Kenith Trodd. Raban wrote a play for Trodd after he moved over to Granada Television but it turned out to be a total failure dramatically. He went on to write seven plays for radio. of which six were produced by Richard Wortley but, as he states, there was a limited audience for plays of this kind - mostly the blind and "a small coterie of radio listeners who are prepared, in effect, to blind themselves for the duration of the programme. But they are few and far between." He also wrote five more plays for television of which three were broadcast, but again they did not meet with much critical success. His last dramatic effort was a commissioned full-length stage play directed by Eric Thompson at the Bristol Old Vic, but the play closed after a month. In order to get playwriting out of his system, Raban took off to travel in Arabia to research his travelogue, Arabia Through the Looking Glass.

IV This part deals with Raban's experiences with writing for 'the little magazines', mainly feature journalism. He was a book reviewer for the Review, edited by Ian Hamilton, and then later for the New Review, which was larger and glossier but which foundered just like its predecessor. He also did some work for the Radio Times, edited by Geoffrey Cannon, who was able to pay his reviewers considerably more than Hamilton out of the BBC coffers, and was also extremely liberal in terms of fitting in with his reviewers' requirements, particularly if they were working on a book. It was the Radio Times that sent Raban on a sailing ship for three days (it was being used as a prop in The Onedin Line), which was to spark off two books and an obsession with sailing.

There are also some short articles. 'Christmas in Bournemouth' is a highly objective account of a group of OAPs spending their Christmas together at the Cliff Court Hotel, unwanted by their children:

'There were 59 of us. There was one real family party from Egham, complete with a trio of rather subdued children. But nearly everybody had come in a couple. There were childless couples in their 40s, and grandparents in their 50s and 60s whose grown-up children had somehow, inexplicably, failed to invite them for Christmas.'

With his partner, Linda (who appears briefly in Coasting when she collects Raban from the London Docks), they take part in all the arranged festivities. The people are the first generation after the war who had extra money to spend, shown by the expensive electronic gadgetry they all possess. However, the downside is that they have lost the family closeness that existed in the pre-war years, and their children and grandchildren prefer to be unencumbered with any elderly relatives who may embarrass their guests over Christmas. The whole experience at the hotel is a bitter-sweet one and Raban's last memory is of Frances, a lonely spinster hospital worker, waiting forlornly for her bus to 'take her back to her Christchurch maisonette and her job on the geriatric ward.'

Living on Capital describes Raban's early childhood, much of which is re-presented in his travelogue, Coasting. Living with Loose Ends is a rather rambling account of family life, but 'Freya Stark on the Euphrates' and 'Fishing' - describing the writer's long love affair with the rod and reel - are two well-crafted articles that have a strong merit in their own right.

V The last part - and the one in which Raban really comes into his own - deals with travelling and the writing of the travel book and goes a long way to explaining Jonathan Raban's own wanderlust. As he says about travelling and writing,

'Simple wanderlust is relatively easy to fend off, but when it starts to get tangled up with literary motive it becomes irresistible; and literature and travel are anciently, inevitably tangled. Journeys suggest stories, stories take the form of journeys - odysseys, exoduses, pilgrims' and rakes' progresses. Any travelling writer, leaving home, must find it difficult to rid himself of the idea that he's embarking on some kind of real-life picaresque. Before him lie the education and adventures of a rolling stone. Pilgrim, Gulliver, Tom Jones, Mr Yorick have been here before.'

The author also gives some insights into his own method of writing about his travelling in such books as Hunting Mr Heartbreak, Old Glory - his journey in a skiff down the Mississippi - and Passage to Juneau, in which he sails from Seattle to Juneau, Alaska:

'Memory, not the notebook, holds the key. I try to keep a notebook when I'm on the move (largely because writing it makes one feel that one's at work, despite all appearances to the contrary) but hardly ever find anything in the notebook that's worth using later...Memory, though, is always telling stories to itself, filing experience in narrative form. It feeds irrelevancies to the shredder, enlarges on crucial details, makes links and patterns, finds symbols, constructs plots. In memory, the journey takes shape and grows; in the notebook it merely languishes, with the notes themselves like a pile of cigarette butts confronted the morning after a party.'

And again, in 'Stevenson: Sailing towards marriage' Raban gives us a description Robert Louis Stevenson's much-admired writing style in The Amateur Emigrant, about the latter taking passage for America and his fiancee in northern California, that could be a mirror image of his own:

'For Stevenson's temperament was instinctively skeptical and empirical. He hoarded detail for its own sake. He was immensely careful and sympathetic observer of other people's lives. When he came to deal with the physical conditions of the ship and the train, and with the characters of the emigrants, he was a scrupulous miniaturist. Every page of The Amateur Emigrant is dotted with the trifles of life - with smells, fragments of dialect speech, clothes, facial expressions. It has the dense and varied texture of a true record.'

'Belloc at Sea' - about Belloc's The Cruise of the Nona - is in part recreated in Coasting, and 'Young's Slow Boats' is interesting from the perspective of one travel writer writing about another. Raban gives his own thoughts on what has drawn so many writers, including himself, to the travel book:

'It is the supreme improvisatory form; one can play it by ear; it will happily accommodate all sorts of conditions of writing. At its occasional best it works like a constellation, with autobiography, essays, stories, reportage mingling together in a single controlled blaze. More often it has the casual freedom of the scrapbook, into which any old thing can be pasted at will; a lifelike form, certainly, with all of life's contingencies, dead ends, and artlessness.'

'Florida' is a remarkable article based on Raban's visit to Florida, attracted by the thrillers of John D. MacDonald, 'With their bodice-ripper covers and titles like Nightmare in Pink, A Deadly Shade of Gold and A Purple Place for Dying. For Raban, MacDonald (whom he meets three years before his death) created an extremely vivid portrait of a 'jungly Eden, spoilt and besmirched by human vanity and greed ... a lovely paradise that was being cut down to make room for shopping malls, condominium blocks, six-lane highways, giant billboards and pagoda-style Kingburger palaces. Taken together, the novels added up to a resounding "No! Thunder!" They protested against this violation of the innocence of America with shocked and angry vigour.'

Raban goes onto re-create this visit near the end of his later book, Hunting Mister Heartbreak: A Discovery of America (1991), which describes his meandering journey across the U.S.A. and its eventual conclusion in Seattle, where he now permanently resides.

The final article, 'Sea Room', makes a seamless transition from this book to his next one, Coasting (book), recording his circumnavigation of the British Isles. Raban describes his desire to purchase his own boat and take to the sea. He purchases a sextant from a junkshop, made for J.H.C. Minter R.N. and practices the determination of latitude and longitude from his home in St Quintin Avenue, London W.10. He then starts his search for a boat and ends up with the Gosfield Maid, stranded on a mudbank up a Cornish estuary, which is to be his home for the next few years.

== Sources ==
- For Love & Money: Writing, Reading, Travelling, 1968 - 1987, Jonathan Raban, Picador (Pan Books), 1969–87
