= Jason Elliott =

Jason Elliott may refer to:

- Jason Elliott (ice hockey) (born 1975), Canadian hockey player
- Jason Elliott (politician) (born 1970), American politician

== See also ==
- Jason Elliot (born 1965), British writer
