= Ismay, Montana =

- Town
- Location of Ismay, Montana

- Location in the United States
- Coordinates: 46°29′58″N 104°47′34″W
- Country: United States
- State: Montana
- County: Custer

Area
  - Total: 0.42 sq mi (1.09 km^{2})
  - Land: 0.42 sq mi (1.09 km^{2})
  - Water: 0 sq mi (0.00 km^{2})
- Elevation: 2,536 ft (773 m)

Population (2020)
  - Total: 17
  - Density: 40.5/sq mi (15.64/km^{2})
- Time zone: UTC-7 (Mountain (MST))
  - Summer (DST): UTC-6 (MDT)
- ZIP code: 59336
- Area code: 406
- FIPS code: 30-38950
- GNIS feature ID: 2412796

Ismay is a town in Custer County, Montana, United States. The population was 17 at the 2020 census. The town is the least-populous incorporated municipality in the state of Montana.

The town's name is an amalgamation of Isabella and May, the names of the daughters of Albert J. Earling, division superintendent (later president) of the Chicago, Milwaukee and St. Paul Railway. Other communities with related names include Earling, Iowa; Marmarth, North Dakota; and Alberton, Montana. As a publicity stunt coordinated by Kansas City radio station KYYS in 1993, the town unofficially took the name of Joe, Montana, after the NFL quarterback Joe Montana.

The town's history and contemporary state (circa 1995) is discussed at length in travel writer Jonathan Raban's book, Bad Land: An American Romance. According to Raban, Ismay's story is emblematic of the settlement and depopulation of the northern Great Plains.

== Geography ==
According to the United States Census Bureau, the town has a total area of 0.42 square miles (1.09 km^{2}), all land.

Ismay lies between Baker, Montana and Terry on the BNSF Railway's Hettinger Subdivision. The route was once a mainline segment of the Milwaukee Road.

== Demographics ==
Historical population
| Census | Pop. | Note | %± |
|---|---|---|---|
| 1920 | 344 | | — |
| 1930 | 277 | | −19.5% |
| 1940 | 176 | | −36.5% |
| 1950 | 182 | | 3.4% |
| 1960 | 59 | | −67.6% |
| 1970 | 40 | | −32.2% |
| 1980 | 31 | | −22.5% |
| 1990 | 19 | | −38.7% |
| 2000 | 26 | | 36.8% |
| 2010 | 19 | | −26.9% |
| 2020 | 17 | | −10.5% |
U.S. Decennial Census

=== 2020 census ===
As of the 2020 census, there were 17 people living in 12 households. The median household income was $56,539.

=== 2010 census ===
As of the 2010 census, there were 19 people, 9 households, and 5 families living in the town. The population density was 45.2 inhabitants per square mile (17.5/km^{2}). There were 13 housing units at an average density of 31.0 per square mile (12.0/km^{2}). The racial makeup of the town was 100.0% White.

There were 9 households, of which 33.3% had children under the age of 18 living with them, 55.6% were married couples living together, and 44.4% were non-families. 44.4% of all households were made up of individuals, and 22.2% had someone living alone who was 65 years of age or older. The average household size was 2.11 and the average family size was 3.00.

The median age in the town was 46.5 years. 26.3% of residents were under the age of 18; 0% were between the ages of 18 and 24; 21.1% were from 25 to 44; 42.1% were from 45 to 64; and 10.5% were 65 years of age or older. The gender makeup of the town was 57.9% male and 42.1% female.

=== 2000 census ===
At the 2000 census, there were 26 people, 7 households, and 7 families living in the town. The population density was 62.5 inhabitants per square mile (24.1/km^{2}). There were 8 housing units at an average density of 19.2 per square mile (7.4/km^{2}). The racial makeup of the town was 100.00% White. Hispanic or Latino of any race were 3.85% of the population.

There were 7 households, of which 71.4% had children under the age of 18 living with them, 100.0% were married couples living together, and 0.0% were non-families. No households were made up of individuals, and none had someone living alone who was 65 years of age or older. The average household size was 3.71 and the average family size was 3.71.

Age distribution was 42.3% under the age of 18, 34.6% from 25 to 44, 19.2% from 45 to 64, and 3.8% who were 65 years of age or older. The median age was 30 years. For every 100 females there were 100.0 males. For every 100 females age 18 and over, there were 114.3 males.

The median household income was $32,083, and the median family income was $32,083. The per capita income for the town was $9,852. None of the population and none of the families were below the poverty line.

== See also ==
- Bad Land: An American Romance
