= Love v Money =

Love v Money may refer to:

- Love vs. Money (The-Dream album), a 2009 R&B album by The-Dream
- Love Versus Money (Noiseworks album), a 1991 rock album by Noiseworks

== See also ==
- For Love or Money (disambiguation)
- Love and Money (disambiguation)
- Love Not Money, a 1985 jangle pop album by Everything but the Girl
- Love of money
