= Stanley Stewart =

Stanley Stewart FRSL is a British writer, who is the author of three travel books: Old Serpent Nile, Frontiers of Heaven, and In the Empire of Genghis Khan about journeys to the source of the Nile, through China to Xinjiang province, and across Mongolia by horse. The last two books both won the Thomas Cook Travel Book Award, in 1996 and 2001 respectively, making Stewart the only writer, with Jonathan Raban, to have won this prestigious award twice.

He is a contributing editor at Conde Nast Traveller UK. His work appears in various periodicals including the Sunday Times, the Daily Telegraph, and National Geographic Traveler, and has been included in numerous anthologies on both sides of the Atlantic. In 2008, he was named the Magazine Writer of the year.

He was born in Ireland, grew up in Canada, and has spent most of his adult life in the UK.

He was elected a Fellow of the Royal Society of Literature in 2002.

== Works ==
- In the Empire of Genghis Khan: A Journey Among Nomads
- Frontiers of Heaven: A Journey to the End of China
- Old Serpent Nile: A Journey to the Source
