= Bad Land: An American Romance =

1996 book by Jonathan Raban

- First US edition
- Author: Jonathan Raban
- Language: English
- Publisher: Picador (UK); Pantheon Books (US)
- Publication date: 1996
- Pages: 324
- ISBN: 0-679-44254-5
- OCLC: 34472165

Bad Land: An American Romance is a travelogue of Jonathan Raban's research, over a two-year period, into the settlement of southeastern Montana in the early 20th century. The focus of the book is one of the least-populated areas of the United States – the badland area between Marmarth, North Dakota, and Terry, Montana, along the route of the Milwaukee Road railroad and the goings on of various settler families who homesteaded in that area. Emigrants came from Britain, Scandinavia, Russia and Germany in search of a new life in the New World. Nowadays, their ruined houses still stand among forlorn fenceposts trailing whiskers of rusty barbed wire in the arid landscape of eastern Montana, dotted with low buttes and scored with dry creek-beds. The settlers attempted to build a hopeful civilization on the prairie, only to see it collapse within little more than a decade during the time of the Dirty Thirties.

== Plot summary ==
The book begins by going into detail how the area was initially settled. The author places a particularly heavy emphasis on "scientific" developments of the time, sociological conditions, and the exploitation of those developments and conditions by the United States Government and the Milwaukee Road. These were represented in the book by the Campbell's Soil Culture Manual, the desire by those living in Europe and the eastern United States to become landholders, The Homestead Act and government agencies, and advertising by the railroad. As the author states at one point,

... there was real mendacity in the way the scheme (dry homestead scheme) was advertised. The copywriters (who had probably never set eyes on the prairie) and the art editors created a paper-country, as illusory as the Land of Cockaigne. The misleading language and pictures of the pamphlets would eventually entitle the homesteaders to see themselves as innocent dupes of a government that was in the pocket of the corporation fatcats – and their sense of betrayal would fester through the generations.

Further into the book, the author describes the settlement in terms of a grand experiment to impose civilization on a previously wild region. The society of that period is portrayed as one filled with innocent optimism and feelings of unlimited potential to be part of big, important things. This is represented in the book by the barbed wire fence and set piece, half-section farm plots of 320 acres (1.3 km^{2}).

The author further delves into the societal development of the settlers by describing many details of the aforementioned society after it becomes established. The Montana plains society is depicted as one that seems to be realizing its dreams, attracting people and commerce, and having all the trappings of an American frontier settlement. It is clearly indicated that this society is at its apex. The stories of various settler families are recounted, particularly that of Ned Wollaston and his family who started out – just like the other immigrants – farming their 320 acres (1.3 km^{2}) of dust. Raban acknowledges his debt to Percy Wollaston for his unpublished memoir, Homesteading, and is frequently accompanied by Michael J. Wollaston who helps him "shape the story over a succession of field trips, lunches and burrowings in the Wollaston family papers."

Reality comes crashing down on the settlers when, as the author puts it, the land asserts its wild self, throwing off the civilization imposed on it. The settlers realize that the land could not support the number of people who were trying to make a living from it. Even back in 1908, when Congress was debating the Enlarged Homestead bill, representative William A. Reeder from Kansas had, in Raban's words, struck a note of dour realism, only to be shouted down as being a pawn of the big ranchers:

I say that the settler cannot make a living on 640 acres (2.6 km^{2}) of [semi-arid land], nor on 1,280 acres (5.2 km^{2}). There is the trouble. If he could make a living on 320 acres (1.3 km^{2}), it would be all right, but there is where people are deceived. They cannot make a living on 640 acres (2.6 km^{2}), in most cases.

Because many of the settlers felt they had been betrayed by those who convinced them to move to the area and farm there, another societal development is observed: a fiercely independent and rebellious attitude of anti-authoritarian distrust towards Corporate America (particularly "the dwarfish, rabbit-toothed, fat-lipped figure of James J. Hill and his shadowy son, Louis", owners of the Great Northern railway line) and to a much greater extent, the United States Government. As the realization sets in that the land can't support everyone, many are seen leaving-selling their land to those who chose to stay and continue farming. Even the aging Ned and his wife, Dora, eventually send their son, Percy, to Seattle and are forced to lease their land to a young farming couple, prior to moving westwards in their son's footsteps and settling down Thompson Falls.

The downward spiral of the once bustling civilization is seen as having stabilized by the present day. This status quo is one of uneasy teetering between subsistence and poverty. Such is the desperation to "become something" again that some are willing to attempt anything to attract cheap attention, publicity, visitors, and above all, outside commerce and money. The utter disappointment and futility of such efforts are summed up in the failed Ismay/Joe, Montana Day, in which the town adopts the figure of the American football player Joe Montana in an attempt to boost its revenues.

However, it is from his attendance at a local rodeo and his invitations to the BBQ lunches during the branding season (the end of May/early June) that Raban really sees how a rural society has emerged from the failures of the past:

Yet in the last sixty years a form of society has evolved here. It was more modest than the one envisioned by the early settlers. After the great humbling of the Dirty Thirties, people learned how to conform themselves to the place. The land allowed just so much habitation and farming, and no more. The chastened survivors cautiously built their world. And here it was – in the cluster of well-dressed, well-fed families around the corral. One would never have guessed at the amount of ruination that had gone into the making of this scene, of country neighbours, at ease with themselves and each other. This was exactly how the Wollastons, Dockens, Yeargens and the rest would have imagined their new lives on the prairie, as a rooted and stable rural community, with its own language and architecture, costumes and customs.

The book concludes with the author returning home to Seattle, Washington, from southeastern Montana and following the paths of many who left the area featured in the book. The author expresses joy to be living in a place where reality isn't so sharp, but also reminds himself that not far from where he lives and even in his own backyard, there are places, situations, and circumstances that make his life uncomfortably similar to that of someone living in southeastern Montana.

The book is 324 pages long and contains themes, circumstances, and events that repeated themselves in rural areas and towns across the Great Plains during the time period covered.

== Acknowledgements ==
Jonathan Raban makes reference to the following books that helped him in his research:

- Homesteading, Percy Wollaston (unpublished memoir)
- Wheels Across Montana's Prairie (1970s), Prairie County Historical society
- Mildred Memoires of the O'Fallon (1979), Mary Haughian, Terry, MT
- Photographing Montana 1894-1928: The Life and Works of Evelyn Cameron (1991), Donna M. Lucey, NY

== Awards ==
- National Book Critics Circle, General Nonfiction Winner 1997
- PEN USA Literary Awards 1997
- Pacific Northwest Booksellers Association Awards 1997
- Governor's Writers Award of the State of Washington, 1997

== Sources ==
- Raban, Jonathan (1996). Bad Land: An American Romance. Paw Prints. ISBN 0-679-44254-5.

=== Reviews ===
- Garner, Dwight (1996-11-27). "Review; Bad Land: An American Romance". Salon. Archived from the original on 2007-12-09.
- Klinkenborg, Verlyn (1996-11-10). "Railroaded". New York Times (Late Edition - Final ed.). ISSN 0028-7806.
- Beatrice Interview
