= Picador Travel Classics =

Picador Travel Classics is a series of 17 hard-cover books published by Picador during the 1990s. All of the titles are re-prints of what the publishers thought of as "classic" travel literature. Travel literature scholars Holland and Huggan say it is part of a trend in the late 20th century to canonize the travel literature genre, "This is a series that partly announces the classic status - the canonicity - of its volumes through their hardback covers, their introductions and their numbering - it is intended to form a library."

== Series ==
Number	Author	Title	Introduction	Notes
I	Apsley Cherry-Garrard	The Worst Journey in the World	Paul Theroux	1994. Includes the "Postscript to the Worst Journey in the World" (1948) by Cherry Garrard
II	Robert Byron	The Road to Oxiana	Bruce Chatwin	1994
XI	Jonathan Raban	Coasting		1995
XIII	Euclides da Cunha	Rebellion in the Backlands	Samuel Putnam	1995
XV	Isabella Lucy Bird	The Hawaiian Archipelago		1997
XVI	Sybille Bedford	A Visit to Don Otavio	Bruce Chatwin	1997
XII	Gavin Young	Slow Boats to China		1995
IV	Redmond O'Hanlon	Into the Heart of Borneo		1994
X	Edith Wharton	A Motor-Flight Through France	Julian Barnes	1995
III	Norman Lewis	I Came, I Saw		1994
V	Norman Douglas	Old Calabria		1994 This book had no volume number on the dust cover
VII	V. S. Naipaul	An Area of Darkness		1995
XIV	V. S. Naipaul	The Middle Passage		1995
VIII	Colin Thubron	Among the Russians		1995
IX	Alexander Kinglake	Eothen		1995
VI	Paul Theroux	The Great Railway Bazaar		1994 This book had no volume number on the dust cover
XVII	Eric Newby	A Short Walk in the Hindu Kush	Evelyn Waugh	1997
