= Surveillance (disambiguation) =

Surveillance is the monitoring of people's actions.

Surveillance may also refer to:

== Film and literature ==
- Surveillance (1997 film), a 1997 Chinese film
- Surveillance (2006 film), a 2006 film directed by Fritz Kiersch
- Surveillance (2008 film), a 2008 American thriller film directed by Jennifer Lynch
- Surveillance (novel), a 2006 novel by Jonathan Raban

== Music ==
- Surveillance (Triumph album), 1987
- Surveillance (FM album), 1979
- "Surveillance" (song), the debut single of Wynter Gordon
- "Surveillance", a song by Interpol from Marauder
- Surveillance, an electronic music act from Seattle, a side project of Assemblage 23

== See also ==
- Computer surveillance, performing surveillance of computer activity
- Disease surveillance, an epidemiological practice by which the spread of disease is monitored
- Surveillance abuse, the use of surveillance methods to monitor an individual or group in a way that violates the social norms or laws of a society
