= For the Love of Money (disambiguation) =

"For the Love of Money" is a 1973 song by The O'Jays.

For the Love of Money may also refer to:

- For the Love of Money (2012 film), an action crime drama film
- For the Love of Money (album), a 2014 album by Trackhead
- "Foe tha Love of $", a 1995 single by Bone Thugs-n-Harmony
- "For the Love of Money", a 2015 song by Dr. Dre from the album Compton
- For the Love of Money (2021 film), a romantic comedy film directed by Leslie Small

== See also ==
- For Love or Money (disambiguation)
- Love and Money (disambiguation)
- Love of money
