= The Worst Journey in the World =

Memoir by Apsley Cherry-Garrard

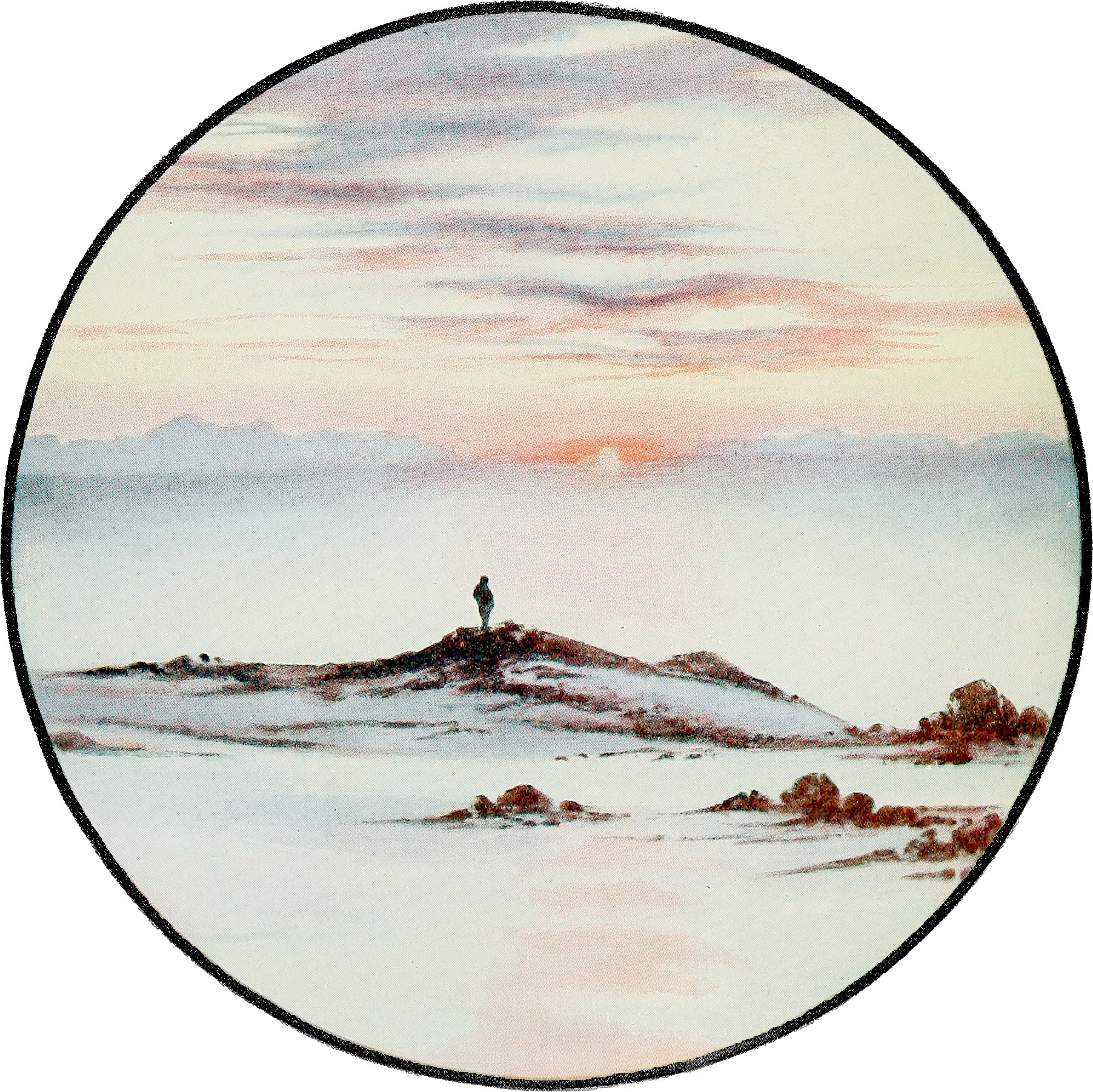
- First volume frontispiece
- Author: Apsley Cherry-Garrard
- Illustrator: Edward Adrian Wilson
- Language: English
- Subject: Terra Nova expedition
- Genre: Personal narrative, travel
- Publisher: Constable & Co.
- Publication date: 1922
- Publication place: United Kingdom
- Pages: 446 (volume 1); 374 (volume 2)
- OCLC: 11711468
- Dewey Decimal: 919.8904
- LC Class: G850 1910.S465
- Text: The Worst Journey in the World at Wikisource

The Worst Journey in the World is a 1922 memoir by Apsley Cherry-Garrard speaking on Robert Falcon Scott's Terra Nova expedition to the South Pole in 1910–1913. It has earned wide praise for its frank treatment of the difficulties of the expedition, the causes of its disastrous outcome, and the meaning of human suffering under extreme conditions.

== Narrative ==
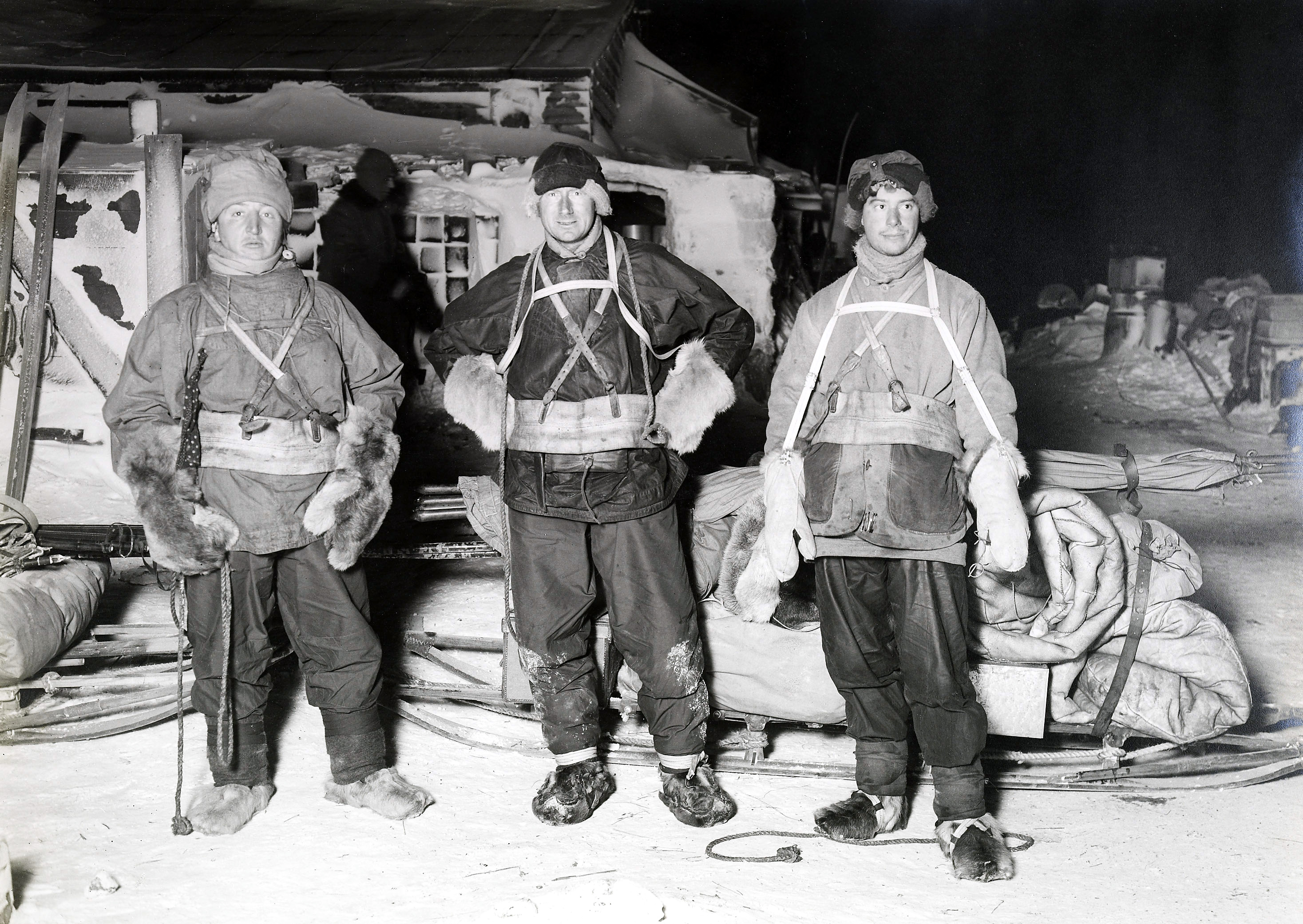
Bowers, Wilson and Cherry-Garrard at the main hut, ready to start on their journey to the emperor penguin rookery

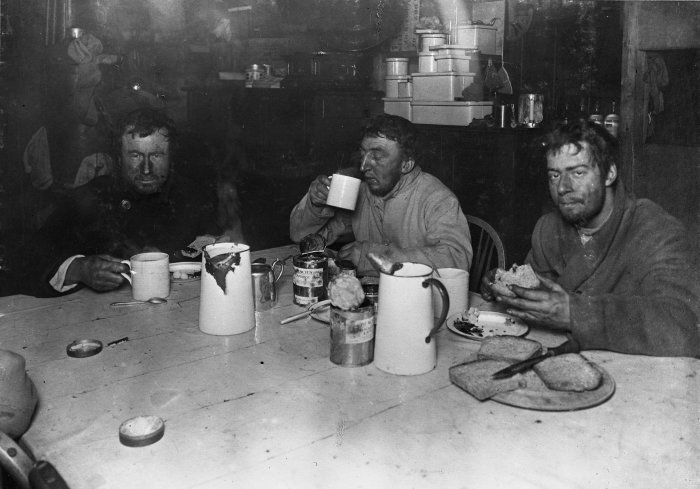
Wilson, Bowers and Cherry-Garrard on their return from Cape Crozier

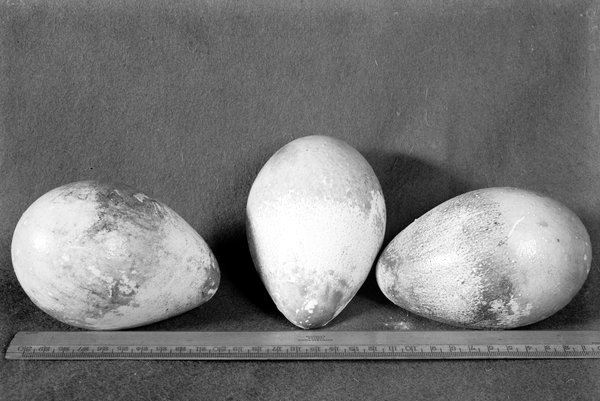
Three emperor penguin eggs survived the journey, but later failed to support Wilson's theories.

=== Preparations ===
In 1910, Cherry-Garrard and his fellow explorers travelled by sailing vessel, the Terra Nova, from Cardiff to McMurdo Sound, Antarctica. "Cherry" was teased at first by some of the other members of this expedition because of his lack of Antarctic experience, his lack of specialised credentials for the position of assistant zoologist to which he had been named, and persistent suspicions among some of his comrades that he had in fact bought his way on board by contributing £1,000 to the expedition's troubled funds. Cherry-Garrard responded to these taunts with modesty, a self-sacrificial ability to work hard, and acute observational skills. He was also, according to novelist, biographer, and socialite Nancy Mitford, the only intellectual amongst the crew. These traits were to serve him well when it came time for him to write down his memories of the expedition. They also caught the eye of the expedition's second-in-command, Edward A. Wilson, who adopted Cherry-Garrard as a protégé.

Wilson's personal goal in Antarctica was to recover eggs of the Emperor penguin for scientific study. It was thought at the time that the flightless penguin might shed light on an evolutionary link between reptiles and birds through its embryo. As the bird nests during the Antarctic winter, it was necessary to mount a special expedition in July 1911, from the expedition's base at Cape Evans, to the penguins' rookery at Cape Crozier. Wilson chose Cherry-Garrard and Henry R. Bowers to accompany him across the Ross Ice Shelf under conditions of complete darkness and temperatures of −40 °C (−40 °F) and below. All three men, barely alive, returned from Cape Crozier with their egg specimens, which were stored.

It was this winter journey, not the later expedition to the South Pole, that Cherry-Garrard described as the "worst journey in the world".

=== Tragedy ===
The expedition then swung into preparations for a march from Cape Evans to the as-yet-unreached South Pole. This march was to be done during the Antarctic summer in 1911–1912. Scott's strategy called for a large team of men, ponies, motor sledges and dogs to start out southward from their base, hauling food and fuel on sledges. As the team progressed southward, the leader would successively send support groups back home, leaving a small "Pole party" of the fittest men to make the final advance to the South Pole.

Cherry-Garrard accompanied the initial team across the Ross Ice Shelf and up the Beardmore Glacier, the slide that discharges ice from the Antarctic Plateau down onto the shelf. At the edge of the polar plateau Scott told him that he would have to return northward. The men not chosen to go on to the Pole all returned to the base camp at Cape Evans. Some returned by ship to Britain; others, including Cherry-Garrard, stayed in the Antarctic and prepared to meet Scott and his four companions on the return journey. But for a variety of reasons, partly described in The Worst Journey in the World, the rendezvous failed.

On the return journey from the Pole, Scott reached the 82° 30′ S meeting point for the dog teams three days ahead of schedule, noting in his diary for 27 February 1912: "We are naturally always discussing possibility of meeting dogs, where and when, etc. It is a critical position. We may find ourselves in safety at the next depot, but there is a horrid element of doubt." By 10 March, it became evident the dog teams were not coming: "The dogs which would have been our salvation have evidently failed. Meares [the dog-driver] had a bad trip home I suppose. It's a miserable jumble." Cherry had been given the task of using the dog teams to meet Scott's party and assist them home, but in fact Cherry-Garrard did not penetrate beyond One Ton Depot, only 11 miles (18 km) distant from Scott's final location where he and his companions froze to death.

In 1912–1913, Cherry-Garrard and other expedition members once again marched southward, this time to try to find traces of their lost comrades. Cherry-Garrard's description of the frozen tent that contained three of them is one of the most dramatic sections of the book. Inside the tent were the remains of Scott and Cherry-Garrard's two companions on the Worst Journey, Bowers and Wilson. In his book, Cherry-Garrard extensively defends his actions and non-actions, and polar historian Roland Huntford has diagnosed the Worst Journey as "an immature but persuasive, highly charged apologia". Cherry-Garrard closes with a written meditation on the themes of self-sacrifice and heroism.

Although The Worst Journey in the World was published only nine years after the end of the Terra Nova expedition, that short length of time had made clear that new technology, particularly caterpillar-tread vehicles—proposed for snow travel by Scott in a 1908 memorandum and developed by his engineer, Reginald Skelton, for the 1910 expedition—and later aeroplanes, would revolutionise future work in the Antarctic and make much of the suffering endured by Scott and his men unnecessary. The next visitors to the South Pole ice surface, in October 1956, would arrive and depart by airplane. The Worst Journey in the World asks, but does not answer, the question of whether this suffering was futile, or whether it would inspire future human beings facing very different challenges.

=== Epilogue ===
The winter journey to the penguin rookery eventually became a case study on how a paradigm shift in scientific methodology can devalue data that had begun to be gathered before the shift. At the time the Terra Nova expedition sailed, many biologists believed in recapitulation theory. They believed that examining the embryos of key species, such as the Emperor penguin, would show how the species – and, by extension, how the family of birds as a whole – had evolved. The expedition's chief scientist Wilson determined to try to collect specimens based upon this theory.

As the survivors of the Terra Nova returned to England several years later, recapitulation theory had begun to be discredited. Cherry-Garrard turned over the egg specimens to embryologists at London's Natural History Museum, who were largely uninterested in the donation. Cherry-Garrard describes how he was told that the retrieved eggs had not added much to their knowledge of penguin embryology, nor to scientific knowledge as a whole. Elspeth Huxley concludes that the eggs generated "negative information".

== Legacy ==
The Worst Journey was republished in 1994 as the first numerical entry of the Picador Travel Classics, and in 2006, by British publishing house Penguin Books as part of their celebrated Penguin Classics series of literature works.

The book was adapted for television by Mark Gatiss—who also portrays Cherry-Garrard—in the BBC Television docudrama The Worst Journey in the World (2007).

In 2022, artist Sarah Airriess published the first volume (of a planned four) of a graphic novel adaptation.
