= Thomas Cook Travel Book Award =

Literary award

The Thomas Cook Travel Book Award originated as an initiative of Thomas Cook AG in 1980, with the aim of encouraging and rewarding the art of literary travel writing. The awards stopped in 2005 (2004 being the last year an award was given). One year later, the only other travel book award in Britain, the Dolman Best Travel Book Award, began in 2006.

== Winners ==
- 2004, Richard Grant, Ghost Riders: Travels with American Nomads
- 2003, Jenny Diski, Stranger on a Train: Daydreaming and Smoking around America With Interruptions
- 2002, Ma Jian, Red Dust: A Path Through China
- 2001, Stanley Stewart, In the Empire of Genghis Khan: An Amazing Odyssey Through the Lands of the Most Feared Conquerors in History
- 2000, Jason Elliot, An Unexpected Light: Travels in Afghanistan
- 1999, Philip Marsden, The Spirit-Wrestlers: A Russian Journey
- 1998, Tim Mackintosh-Smith, Yemen:Travels in Dictionary Land
- 1997, Nicholas Crane, Clear Waters Rising: A Mountain Walk Across Europe
- 1996, Stanley Stewart, Frontiers of Heaven: A Journey to the End of China
- 1995, Gavin Bell, In Search of Tusitala: Travels in the Pacific After Robert Louis Stevenson
- 1994, William Dalrymple, City of Djinns
- 1993, Nick Cohn, The Heart of the World
- 1992, Norman Lewis, A Goddess in the Stones: Travels in India
- 1991, co-winners:
  - Jonathan Raban, Hunting Mister Heartbreak: A Discovery of America
  - Gavin Young, In Search of Conrad
- 1990, Mark Hudson, Our Grandmothers’ Drums
- 1989, Paul Theroux, Riding the Iron Rooster
- 1988, Colin Thubron, Behind the Wall: A Journey Through China
- 1986/87, Patrick Leigh Fermor, Between the Woods and the Water
- 1985, Patrick Marnham, So Far From God: Journey to Central America
- 1984, Geoffrey Moorhouse, To The Frontier
- 1983, Vikram Seth, From Heaven Lake: Travels Through Sinkiang and Tibet
- 1982, Tim Severin, The Sinbad Voyage
- 1981, Jonathan Raban, Old Glory: An American Voyage
- 1980, Robyn Davidson, Tracks
