= Father and Son (Raban book) =

2023 book by Jonathan Raban

- Author: Jonathan Raban
- Language: English
- Publisher: Knopf
- Publication date: 2023
- Publication place: United States
- Pages: 336
- ISBN: 9780375422454

Father and Son is a 2023 memoir by writer Jonathan Raban, published by Knopf, a subsidiary of Penguin Random House. The memoir details Raban's 2011 stroke as well as his protracted recovery after the event, as well as his father's exploits as a British officer in World War II. The book was posthumously released in 2023 after Raban's death earlier in the same year.

== Narrative ==
The memoir details the writer's brain bleed, leading to a stroke on June 11, 2011. At the time of the stroke, at age 69, he was smoking cigarettes and had uncontrolled blood pressure. He was unaware that his symptoms of arm numbness and weakness were due to a stroke, but after several hours, he asked his teenage daughter to take him to the emergency department. In the hospital in northern Seattle (Raban had been living in Seattle since 1990), he underwent rehab. The stroke affected his ability to walk and confined him to a wheelchair, however his ability to read and write remained entirely intact. Raban documented the rehab process, including positive relationships he developed with healthcare workers. But Raban also wrote of negative interactions in which he felt belittled and pitied by others, with one healthcare worker asking him "Would you like to go potty now?" and a physician inquiring if he used to be a writer. With Raban defiantly replying: "I very much hope that I'm still a writer". During the long recovery process, Raban found solace in reading, and he continued to work on his memoir, which was eventually published in 2023.

The second half of the memoir documents Raban's father's (Peter Raban) activities in World War II, including taking part in the Dunkirk evacuation and subsequent activities in the North African and Italian campaigns including the Battle of Anzio. Raban documented these experiences using first hand, primary sources, namely letters that his father wrote from the field to his wife Monica. The letters also displayed the tender love that Peter had for Monica. Peter Raban returned to England after the war and became an Anglican priest.

== Reception ==
Writing for the New York Times, Dwight Garner stated that the parts of the memoir documenting Raban's recovery from a stroke were more personal and intimate than the parts documenting his father's life. Garner stated: "Raban never quite finds the links between father and son that would suggest a continuity of soul between them." In a negative review in The Guardian, Anthony Quinn criticized the book's disparate two halves as poorly complimenting each other as part of the narrative, stating: "The halves of the book don't fit together, don't really comment on each other". Quinn also criticized Raban for failing to document his relationship with his father after he returned home from the war feeling that large swathes explaining Raban's relationship with his father were omitted. Writing for the Los Angeles Times, Mary Ann Gwinn also felt that there were aspects of Raban's relationship with his father omitted from the book, but in conclusion she stated: "Regardless of its ellisions (or maybe because of them), “Father and Son” has the feel of a valediction; its force is doubled by the knowledge that Raban spent what remained of his life trying to complete it."
