= Richard Grant (writer) =

British travel writer

- Born: 1963 (age 62–63); Malaysia
- Education: University College, London
- Occupations: Travel writer and memoirist
- Notable work: American Nomads (UK: Ghost Riders); God's Middle Finger (UK: Bandit Roads); Dispatches from Pluto
- Awards: Thomas Cook Travel Book Award

Richard Grant (born 1963) is a freelance British travel writer and memoirist based in Arizona.

== Life and career ==
Grant was born in Malaysia, lived in Kuwait as a boy and then moved to London, where he attended school in Hammersmith and received a history degree from University College, London. After graduation, he worked as a security guard, a janitor, a house painter and a club DJ before moving to America, where he lived a nomadic life in the American West, eventually settling in Tucson, Arizona, as a base from which to travel. He supported himself by writing articles for Men's Journal, Esquire and Details, among others. Grant and girlfriend Mariah, moved to New York City briefly, before relocation to Pluto, Mississippi, in August 2012. They married there, then moved to Jackson, Mississippi, in 2015. As of 2022, Richard Grant is again living in Tucson.

Grant's first book, American Nomads (2003, UK: Ghost Riders), looks at nomadism and people who choose to live on the road in America. It won the 2004 Thomas Cook Travel Book Award.Grant wrote the script for a BBC documentary called American Nomads, based in part on the book, which aired in the fall of 2011.

God's Middle Finger (UK: Bandit Roads, 2008) is about the lawless region of the Sierra Madre mountains in northwestern Mexico through which Grant travelled. It was nominated for the 2009 Dolman Best Travel Book Award. Grant co-wrote a screenplay about the Mexican border with Johnny Ferguson and Ruben Ruiz entitled Tres Huevos/A Burning Thing.

Crazy River: Exploration and Folly in East Africa (2011) is about Grant's travels in harrowing situations around East Africa, including an attempt at the first descent of the Malagarasi River in Tanzania.

Dispatches from Pluto, released in October 2015, describes his move to Pluto, Mississippi, with his then girlfriend Mariah, and their life and impressions about the Mississippi Delta. Tom Zoellner, writing in The New York Times, observed: "Grant's British accent doubtlessly served him well, allowing him to move through the tradition-bound society of the Mississippi Delta like a neutron, without obvious allegiances or biases." It was the best-selling book in Mississippi for two years and won a Pat Conroy Southern Book Prize.

The Deepest South of All: True Stories from Natchez, Mississippi sought to explore the contradictions and eccentricities of a complex city.

A Race to the Bottom of Crazy: Dispatches from Arizona (2024) is about Grant's return to Arizona with his wife Mariah. It is a mix of memoir, research, and reporting about Arizona's culture of individualism and anecdotal stories.

== Bibliography ==
- American Nomads: Travels with Lost Conquistadors, Mountain Men, Cowboys, Indians, Hoboes, Truckers, and Bullriders, [UK: Ghost Riders: Travels with American Nomads] (2003)
- God's Middle Finger: Into the Lawless Heart of the Sierra Madre [UK: Bandit Roads: Into the Lawless Heart of Mexico] (2008)
- Crazy River: Exploration and Folly in East Africa (2011)
- Dispatches from Pluto: Lost and Found in the Mississippi Delta (2015)
- The Deepest South of All: True Stories from Natchez, Mississippi (2020)
- A Race to the Bottom of Crazy: Dispatches from Arizona (2024)
