= Pluto, Mississippi =

- Unincorporated community
- Location within Mississippi Location within the United States
- Coordinates: 33°03′12″N 90°22′52″W
- Country: United States
- State: Mississippi
- County: Holmes
- Elevation: 115 ft (35 m)
- Time zone: UTC-6 (Central (CST))
  - Summer (DST): UTC-5 (CDT)
- Area code: 662
- GNIS feature ID: 676158

Pluto is an unincorporated community in Holmes County, Mississippi, United States. Pluto is located on the Yazoo River. A post office operated under the name Pluto from 1886 to 1918.

Climate data for Pluto, MS (1991-2020 normals)
Month	Jan	Feb	Mar	Apr	May	Jun	Jul	Aug	Sep	Oct	Nov	Dec	Year
Mean daily maximum °F (°C)	58.4 (14.7)	62.6 (17.0)	70.8 (21.6)	78.9 (26.1)	86.0 (30.0)	92.1 (33.4)	94.3 (34.6)	94.9 (34.9)	90.5 (32.5)	80.5 (26.9)	68.8 (20.4)	60.7 (15.9)	78.2 (25.7)
Daily mean °F (°C)	48.5 (9.2)	52.0 (11.1)	59.4 (15.2)	67.5 (19.7)	75.6 (24.2)	82.1 (27.8)	84.7 (29.3)	84.6 (29.2)	79.3 (26.3)	68.7 (20.4)	57.5 (14.2)	51.0 (10.6)	67.6 (19.8)
Mean daily minimum °F (°C)	38.6 (3.7)	41.4 (5.2)	48.0 (8.9)	56.1 (13.4)	65.1 (18.4)	72.1 (22.3)	75.1 (23.9)	74.4 (23.6)	68.2 (20.1)	57.0 (13.9)	46.1 (7.8)	41.2 (5.1)	56.9 (13.8)
Average precipitation inches (mm)	5.69 (145)	5.57 (141)	5.94 (151)	6.58 (167)	5.74 (146)	4.37 (111)	4.02 (102)	4.51 (115)	3.31 (84)	4.27 (108)	4.57 (116)	5.81 (148)	60.38 (1,534)
Average snowfall inches (cm)	0.1 (0.25)	0.0 (0.0)	0.0 (0.0)	0.0 (0.0)	0.0 (0.0)	0.0 (0.0)	0.0 (0.0)	0.0 (0.0)	0.0 (0.0)	0.0 (0.0)	0.0 (0.0)	0.0 (0.0)	0.1 (0.25)
Average precipitation days (≥ 0.01 in)	8.9	8.8	8.9	7.6	8.1	7.5	7.9	7.2	5.0	5.9	7.2	9.0	92.0
Average snowy days (≥ 0.1 in)	0.1	0.0	0.0	0.0	0.0	0.0	0.0	0.0	0.0	0.0	0.0	0.0	0.1
Source: NOAA

== In popular culture ==
- Pluto is the setting for Dispatches from Pluto written by Richard Grant.
