= Mirrors of the Unseen =

2006 book by Jason Elliot

Mirrors of the Unseen: Journeys in Iran
- Author: Jason Elliot
- Language: English
- Genre: Travel
- Publication date: 2006
- ISBN: 9780312301910

Mirrors of the Unseen: Journeys in Iran (2006) is a travel book written by British travel writer Jason Elliot.

== See also ==
- An Unexpected Light: Travels in Afghanistan
