= Surveillance (novel) =

2006 novel by Jonathan Raban

- First edition (UK)
- Author: Jonathan Raban
- Language: English
- Genre: Novel
- Publisher: Picador (UK); Pantheon Books (US)
- Publication date: September 2006 (UK); January 2007 (US)
- Publication place: United Kingdom
- Media type: Print (Hardback)
- Pages: 272 pp
- ISBN: 978-0-375-42244-7
- OCLC: 70775796
- Dewey Decimal: 823/.914 22
- LC Class: PR6068.A22 S87 2006

Surveillance (2006) is the third novel by Jonathan Raban.
