= Soft City =

- First US edition
- Author: Jonathan Raban
- Publisher: Hamish Hamilton (UK); E.P. Dutton (US)
- Publication date: 1974
- ISBN: 0-525-20661-2
- OCLC: 1055380
- Dewey Decimal: 301.36
- LC Class: HT133 .R3 1974a

Soft City is the first book written by Jonathan Raban, and published by Hamish Hamilton (UK) and E. P. Dutton & Company (US) in 1974.

== Synopsis ==
Soft City contains essays and personal reflections on urban life, discussing things such as self-expression and gentrification. A key idea is that cities are "soft" in the sense that city dwellers can impart meaning onto them as they create their identities. Throughout the text, Raban references writers such as Jane Jacobs, Lewis Mumford, Frederick Engels, Robert E. Park, Ralph Ellison, and Plato.

In a retrospective of Soft City, the Museum of Walking described the "soft city" concept as a "mythic city, where illusion, dream, aspiration, and nightmare are all fixed into place...passed through and acted upon by an individual or a collective."
