= Passage to Juneau =

1999 travelogue by Jonathan Raban

Passage to Juneau: A Sea and Its Meanings
- First US edition
- Author: Jonathan Raban
- Publisher: Picador (UK); Pantheon Books (US)
- Publication date: 1999
- ISBN: 0-679-44262-6
- Dewey Decimal: 917.98/2 21
- LC Class: F851 .R33 1999

Passage to Juneau: A Sea and Its Meanings is a 1999 travelogue by Jonathan Raban. Alongside an account of Raban's own trip by boat from Seattle to Juneau, the reader is presented with the voyage of Captain George Vancouver between 1792 and 1794 and his encounters with the seagoing natives living along the coast.
