= Foreign Land (novel) =

1985 novel by Jonathan Raban

- First edition (UK)
- Author: Jonathan Raban
- Publisher: Collins Harvill (UK); Viking Press (US)
- Publication date: 1985
- ISBN: 0-330-29230-7
- OCLC: 15664458

Foreign Land (1985) is the first novel by Jonathan Raban.

== Plot ==
The novel opens with Sheila Grey, George's daughter and her partner, Tom, discussing the imminent return of her father from Bom Porto. In a letter, he tells her of his plans to retire to his parents’ house in St Cadix, Cornwall. The action then moves to Bom Porto, the capital of Montedor – an independent Marxist Republic - where we first meet George, who is the manager of a bunkering station. He plays a game of squash with Eduordo (Teddy) Duarte, the Minister of Communications, who informs him about the President's plans to use Cubans to subjugate the mountainous Wolofs, a tribe who have historically been hostile towards the coastal Creole population. George later settles his affairs and is given a surprise official send-off and eventually arrives in Britain, booking himself into a Post House Hotel at Heathrow rather than choosing to stay with Sheila.

The scene then shifts to St Cadix and an annual Christmas drinks party held by George's neighbours, the Walpoles. Most of the people there, like George, are retirees and spend their time talking about their past lives. It is here that George meets Diana Pym, who gives him a lift back to his house, Thalassa, where he discovers that she was the former singer, Julie Midnight. When down by the harbour, George is approached by a St Cadix resident and informed about a boat, the Calliope, that is for sale – it belongs to a Wing Commander and his wife who are in financially strained circumstances and they need to sell it. He reflects back on a time in Bom Porto when he was given some money by the President for previously attending a Pan-African shipping convention whilst a Portuguese patrol vessel was sabotaged during the PAIM revolution against its colonial masters. George refused the money but it was automatically transferred to a Geneva bank account, and it is this money that he uses to purchase Calliope. George travels to London to visit Sheila who, as S.V. Grey, is the author of a popular feminist book. During his visit he is presented with an old sextant that Tom had been planning to sell. George had learnt how to use one whilst studying at Pwllheli, under Commonader Prynne, an elderly navigation instructor and he is pleased to find out he has still retained his skills. As Tom gives him a lift down to Heathrow, from which George is flying to collect his money in Geneva, George tells him of his plans to sail round England.

Back at Thalassa, six tea chests arrive from Africa containing all George's worldly goods. He decides to totally overhaul and spring clean the boat before taking some of his possessions on board. Whilst having a Sunday drink at the Royal St Cadix Yacht Club, he is informed of an item in the news about Montedor and the suppression of a rising of Muslim wolf tribesmen. George is saddened by the news and writes a letter to Vera, his ex-lover in the capital, to try to find out more news from his former homeland. He is then visited on board Calliope by Diana Pym and arranges a return visit to her house. He is surprised by the natural beauty of her wild garden and finds out more about Diana's life and her time spent in California. Whilst on board Calliope, George reflects back on his childhood and his parents, particularly his father, Denys Ferguson Grey, a Church of England Rector. They had a difficult relationship (as Raban did with his own father) and it was only when George entered the navy that the tables started to turn and he acquired some kind of ascendancy. Living at Thalassa, however, it seems to him that he is surprised by how he is steadily turning into his father:

His parents were more alive, more real to him now, than he was to himself. They had some sort of knack, a staying power, that George had failed to inherit. Thalassa bulged with them, while he still tip-toed round it like a weekend guest. Their past was still intact (how did they manage it?) while George’s felt as if it was crumbling from under him so fast that he couldn’t even count its going.

Sheila, whilst trying to work on her new book in London, receives a telephone call from her father saying he is coming to visit them in his boat and she is not pleased by his growing eccentricity:

She was helpless. Everything about him grated on her now – the cracked gallantry, the old naval slang. She couldn’t deal with it at all. Not that she had ever got on with George; but the man she used to meet on his summer leaves hadn’t been like this. He’d been stiff, evasive, too polished by half, yet Sheila felt that if he only once relaxed his guard, she might find someone there whom she could talk to. Well, there was no talking to the ramshackle figure on the far end of the phone.

Beginning his single-handed voyage to London, George again reflects back on his past life and his first meeting his ex-wife, the beautiful Angela Haigh, at a party also attended by Cyril Connolly, whom George manages to successfully snub. A virgin, he is overwhelmed by Angela's attention after the incident and they indulge in a hasty sex session in a small storage room. He is later warmly welcomed by her family and the two are married in his father's church after which the Haighs host a lavish reception. After fifteen months, Angela became pregnant and George took a job in Aden, arranged for him by her father. There, Angela plays the young social hostess but George finds himself becomingly increasingly lonely when she returns to England during the long, hot summers. Their marriage slowly starts to break down to the point where Angela openly detests him and returns home one day with a young bachelor lover, Bill Nesbit.

Arriving in Lyme Regis, George encounters an old colleague from his navigation school, 'Midships' Marsland, who is now running a chandler's store. However, Marsland at first fails to recognise him and then George realizes that he has actually taken his nickname from another pupil at Pwllheli which turns George against him. After leaving Lyme Regis, George successfully navigates Callipoe past the Race around Portland Bill, and in his elation decides to finally pour his thoughts out on a series of smutty postcards bought at Weymouth to Sheila. He also writes to Diana on the same cards. All the recipients are concerned about him – Tom tells Sheila that he will try and track George down and Diana also sets off in her car to do the same but for a different reason:

There was nothing ambiguous in the cards; the double-entendres on one side only helped to underline the plainness of the statement on the other. They were a declaration, and an invitation ... It had been years since Diana had done anything much on impulse. The easiest answer to temptation was always to stay at home and get on with the gardening.

However, it is at Rye that George makes the decision that it to change his life. Travelling to Dover to buy some Admiralty charts, a Q-flag and two red lamps, he returns to Rye and loads up his boat with provisions, helped by three unemployed youths. As the novel ends, he is steering his boat cautiously through a fleet of Spanish tunnymen somewhere northwest of Ushant.

== Sources ==
Foreign Land, Jonathan Raban, Pan Books, 1985
