= An Unexpected Light =

Book by Jason Elliot

An Unexpected Light: Travels in Afghanistan
- Author: Jason Elliot
- Genre: travel books
- Publication date: 1999

An Unexpected Light: Travels in Afghanistan (1999) is a travel book written by British travel writer Jason Elliot. An Unexpected Light won the Thomas Cook Travel Book Award in the UK and became a New York Times bestseller in the US.

== Awards and honors ==
- 2002: ALA Notable Books for Adults
- 2000: Thomas Cook Travel Book Award
- 1999: New York Times bestseller

== See also ==
- Mirrors of the Unseen: Journeys in Iran
