= Arabia Through the Looking Glass =

Book by Jonathan Raban

- First edition
- Author: Jonathan Raban
- Publisher: William Collins, Sons
- Publication date: 1979
- ISBN: 0-00-654022-8
- OCLC: 12481953

Arabia Through the Looking Glass is Jonathan Raban's first travel book, published in 1979, describing his travels in the Middle East, the Arab countries he visits and the people he meets along the way.

== Overview ==
Raban wrote Arabia during the oil boom era when there was a flood of Arabs into Britain after the oil price was raised in 1973. Interested in the Arabs he sees on the Earls Court Road where he has a flat, Raban sets out to visit Arabia in the footsteps of writers like T. E. Lawrence and Wilfred Thesiger. He first attempts to learn Arabic with the beautiful Fatma in London before travelling to Bahrain, Doha, Abu Dhabi, Dubai, Yemen, Egypt and Jordan. His journey comes full circle with his return to London, described by Raban in the book's final chapter as 'The Biggest Souk in the World'.

== Sources ==
- Arabia Through the Looking Glass, Picador (1987) ISBN 0-330-30058-X
