= Jason Elliot =

British travel writer and novelist

Jason Elliot (born 1965) (Note: Salon magazine says about 1960 (went to Afghanistan when he was 19, in 1979).) is a British travel writer and novelist. He had written about his journeys through Afghanistan, once at 19 and again, as described in the book, An Unexpected Light: Travels in Afghanistan, for which he received the Thomas Cook Travel Book Award in 2000 and the ALA Notable Books for Adults in 2002. His second book was on his travels through Iran, in the book, Mirrors of the Unseen: Journeys in Iran, which was published in 2006. Four years later, his first novel The Network was published.

== Early life ==
Elliot took a summer vacation to Afghanistan when he was 19. At that time, the Afghans were engaged in the Soviet–Afghan War. He traveled into the country from Pakistan with the anti-Soviet rebels, the mujahedin. Elliot wrote about his adventures in the book An Unexpected Light: Travels in Afghanistan. He said of one night's experience, "I knew then that I lacked the qualities necessary for guerrilla warfare. I wanted to go home... So what, in fact, if the Communists stayed in Kabul forever? Was it really worth risking our lives for?" The New York Times found that he was brave, willing to travel with the mujahedin into the country, and then travel into remote areas with no roads, and speak enough Dari to manage his way and find someone who will let him spend the night.

== Career ==
His books about travel include An Unexpected Light: Travels in Afghanistan (1999), which is a return trip from a vacation that he took at age 19 when the country was at war. It expresses his interest for the Afghan people, their country, and history. For instance, it includes information about ancient history, like Alexander the Great, as well as contemporary figures, like the mujahedin commander, Abdul Haq, who made fearless raids on the Soviets. The New York Times review stated it is "strikingly descriptive in places and rhetorically overwrought and self-dramatizing in others." For An Unexpected Light, he won the Thomas Cook Travel Book Award in 2000 and the ALA Notable Books for Adults in 2002. His book, Mirrors of the Unseen: Journeys in Iran was published in 2006.

His first novel, The Network, written in 2010, tells the story of a divorced landscaper and former British soldier who is brought into a ring of people from his country's military, diplomatic, and espionage services to manage geo-political issues that they believe their government is ineffective at managing. He is tasked to find a friend who needs rescuing after having been a mole for Al-Qaeda for ten years, and to also destroy an arsenal of Stinger missiles hidden away in Afghanistan.
