= Jonathan Raban =

British travel writer, critic, and novelist (1942–2023)

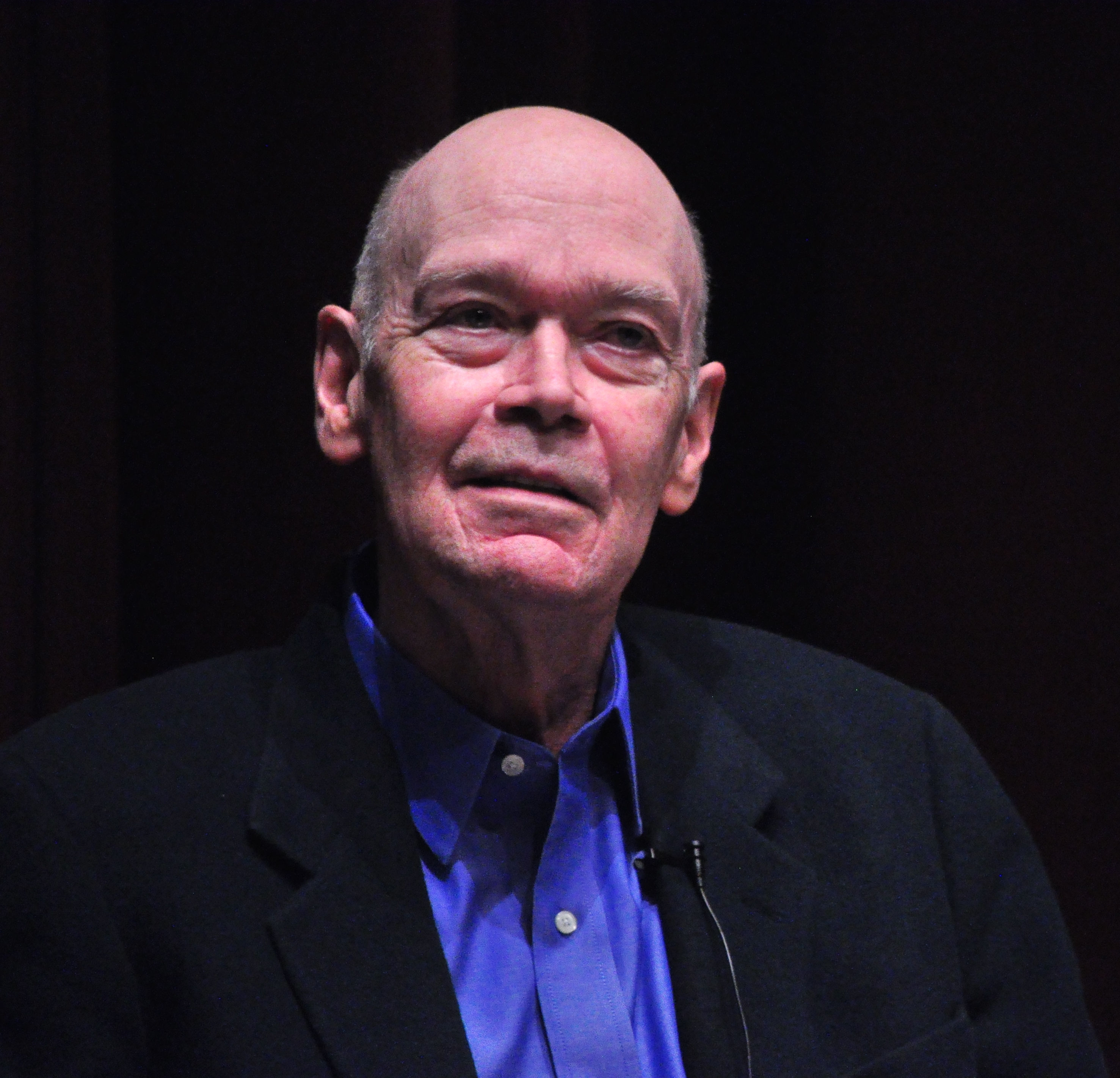
- Raban in 2013
- Born: Jonathan Mark Hamilton Priaulx Raban; 14 June 1942; Hempton, Norfolk, England
- Died: 17 January 2023 (aged 80); Seattle, Washington, U.S.
- Education: University of Hull
- Spouses: Bridget Johnson (divorced); Caroline Cuthbert (divorced); Jean Lenihan (divorced)
- Children: 1
- Writing career
- Genres: Travel writing; journalism; fiction

Jonathan Mark Hamilton Priaulx Raban (14 June 1942 – 17 January 2023) was a British award-winning travel writer, playwright, critic and novelist.

== Early life ==
Jonathan Raban was born on 14 June 1942 in Norfolk. He was the son of Monica Raban (née Sandison) and the Rev Canon J. Peter C.P. Raban, whom he did not actually meet until he was three due to his father's military service in World War II. According to his distant cousin, Evelyn Waugh, in his autobiography A Little Learning, this branch of the Raban family were first recorded in the early 1500s as yeoman farmers in Penn, Staffordshire, before they moved to London in the early 1700s where they went into business and, subsequently, into the professions, Colonial Service, and the British Army. He was sent to boarding school at the age of five. He was educated at King's School, Worcester, where, like his father, he was unhappy but discovered the comforting value of literature. He went on to study English at the University of Hull, where he became friends with the poet Philip Larkin. He supported himself by teaching English and American literature.

== Career ==
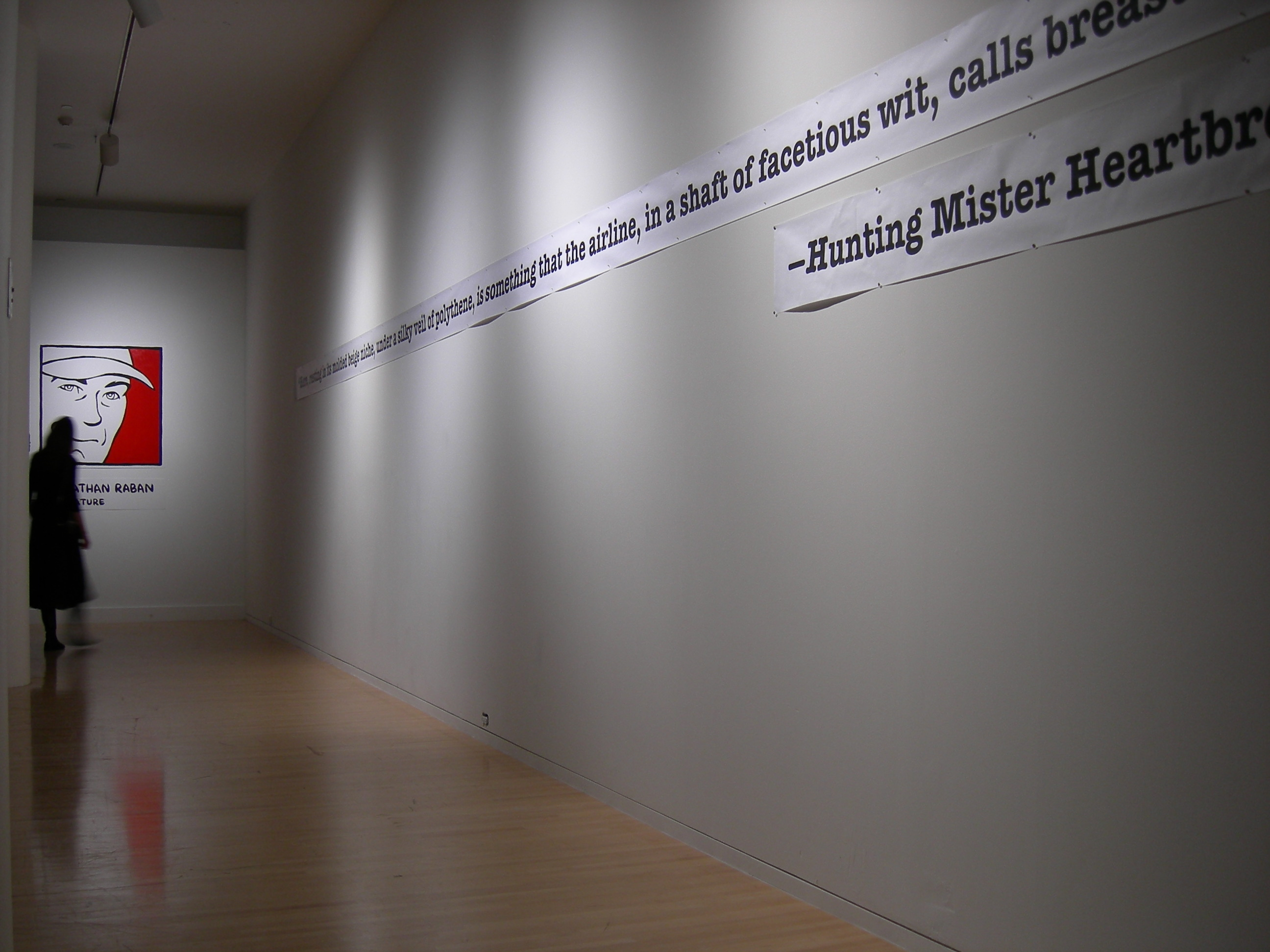
2006 exhibit at the Henry Art Gallery in Seattle honouring the Stranger Genius Award winners paid tribute to Raban.

Raban began his career lecturing at Aberystwyth University in Wales. He then moved to the creative writing department of the University of East Anglia under Malcolm Bradbury. Among his pupils there were the future novelists Rose Tremain and Ian McEwan.

In 1969 Raban moved to London and became a freelance writer and journalist, specialising in book reviews. From 1974 he wrote regular pieces of literary criticism for the newly-founded New Review. In 1979 he embarked on his career as a travel writer with his first work Arabia Through The Looking Glass. He followed up in 1981 with Old Glory, which recounted his journey down the Mississippi from Minneapolis to New Orleans. In addition to his travel books he wrote three novels, starting with Foreign Land in 1985. This was followed by Waxwings in 2003 and Surveillance in 2006. As he became better known, his writing diversified into short fiction which was published in The London Magazine, alongside radio plays for the BBC, and numerous book reviews for The New York Review of Books and The Sunday Times. The editor of The Sunday Times labelled him "the most troublesome reviewer ... ever" but kept him on as a reviewer even though he sent back many books without reviewing them.

His travel books combined observation of place with current events and personal reflection. His writing, as The Daily Telegraph put it, mixed "fact, fiction, travelogue, sociology, historical anecdote, reportage, memoir, confessional and literary criticism, and [created] a style entirely his own." Raban said of this work that the books were "concerned with what used to be called 'human geography': writing about place--about people's place in place, and their displacement in it" and owed "something to the novel, something to the essay, something to the memoir, something to history, and biography, and criticism, and geography." Old Glory is set during the build-up to Ronald Reagan’s victory in the 1980 presidential election, Coasting as the Falklands War begins, and Passage to Juneau as the failure of Raban’s marriage became apparent.

For Coasting, who, like Foreign Land described a sailing trip all round the island of Britain, he learnt to sail in three weeks, instructed by a retired naval officer, and set off in a 30-foot wooden ketch. Despite his reservations, he found that he really liked sailing on his own. In critical assessments, Coasting has been described as using its account of a solo circumnavigation of Britain to frame a wider exploration of contemporary Britain, combining introspective narrative with a “sharp portrait of a nation at war” during the Falklands conflict.

Raban's final work, a memoir documenting his stroke in 2011 including the long recovery process, as well as documenting his father's service as a British officer in World War II, was posthumously released in 2023.

== Personal life ==
Raban married three times, first to Bridget (Bridie) Johnson in 1964, whom he met at university; then to Caroline Cuthbert, an art dealer, in 1985; and finally to Jean Lenihan in 1992. All three marriages ended in divorce. From 1990 he lived with his and Jean's daughter, Julia, in Seattle.

In 1973, Raban had a son, Alexander, by Amanda Reeve.

In 2011, Raban suffered a stroke which left him in a wheelchair. He died from related complications in Seattle on 17 January 2023, at the age of 80.

== Awards ==
Raban received multiple awards, including the National Book Critics Circle Award, The Royal Society of Literature's Heinemann Award, the Thomas Cook Travel Book Award, the PEN West Creative Nonfiction Award, the Pacific Northwest Booksellers Association Award, and a 1997 Washington State Governor's Writer's Award. In 2003, his novel Waxwings was long listed for the Man Booker Prize.

- Heinemann Award, 1982
- Thomas Cook Travel Book Award, 1981 and 1991
- National Book Critics Circle Award, 1996
- Pacific Northwest Booksellers’ Award (PNBA), 1997
- PEN Center USA Award for Creative Nonfiction, 1997
- The Stranger newspaper "Genius Awards", 2006 Article

== Bibliography ==
=== Plays ===
- Square (teleplay), Granada, 1971.
- A Game of Tombola, BBC Radio 3, 1972.
- Centre Play: Water Baby, BBC Radio 2, 1975
- At the Gate, BBC Radio 3, 1975.
- The Anomaly, BBC Radio 3, 1975
- Snooker (teleplay), BBC-TV, 1975.
- Square Touch, Old Vic Theatre, Bristol, England, 1977
- Will You Accept the Call?, BBC Radio 3, 1977
- The Sunset Touch, 1977

=== Travel books ===
- Soft City (1974), Hamish Hamilton, ISBN 0-525-20661-2
- Arabia Through the Looking Glass (1979), William Collins, ISBN 0-00-654022-8
- Old Glory: An American Voyage (1981), William Collins, ISBN 0-671-25061-2
- Coasting (1986), Harvill Press, ISBN 0-00-272119-8
- Hunting Mister Heartbreak: A Discovery of America (1990), Collins Harvill, ISBN 0-002-72031-0
- The Oxford Book of the Sea (editor) (1992), Oxford University Press, ISBN 0-19-214197-X
- Bad Land: An American Romance (1996), Picador and Pantheon Books, ISBN 0-679-44254-5
- Passage to Juneau: A Sea and Its Meanings (1999), Picador and Pantheon Books, ISBN 0-679-44262-6
- Driving Home: An American Journey (2011), Pantheon Books, ISBN 978-0-307-37991-7

=== Novels ===
- Foreign Land (1985), Collins Harvill, ISBN 0-670-80767-2
- Waxwings (2003), Picador and Pantheon Books, ISBN 0-375-41008-2
- Surveillance (2006), Picador and Pantheon Books, ISBN 978-0-375-42244-7

=== Essays ===
- 'Sea Room' Granta 10: Travel Writing Winter 1983
- “In the wild West the improbable is always possible” Pacific North West 26 September, 2004
- 'Second Nature' Granta 102: The New Nature Writing, July 2008
- 'Battleground of the Eye' Atlantic Monthly 1 March 2001 pp 40–52
- 'Granny in the Doorway', London Review of Books 17 August 2017 pp 41–43
- "Belt, boots and spurs : Jonathan Raban on his father's flight to Dunkirk". London Review of Books. 39 (19): 35–41. 5 October 2017.
- 'The Hostile City' Architectural Review vol 154 no. 919, September 1973 pp150–158

=== Interviews ===
- The Arts Fuse (6 Mar 2007) – Interview with Jonathan Raban about the Critical Condition and his novel, Surveillance
- University of Washington, Upon Reflection – Video interview with Jonathan Raban about his book on immigrants in Montana, Badlands
- Hitler's Coming; Time for Cocktails and Gossip interview with Jonathan Raban on National Public Radio series 'You must read this' re Evelyn Waugh’s Put Out More Flags. 1 July 2008

=== Other writing ===
- The Technique of Modern Fiction: Essays in Practical Criticism, Edward Arnold (London, England) (1968)
- Mark Twain: Huckleberry Finn (1968)
- The Society of the Poem (1971)
- For Love & Money: A Writing Life, 1968-1987 (1989), ISBN 0-06-016166-3
- God, Man and Mrs Thatcher: A Critique of Mrs Thatcher's Address to the General Assembly of the Church of Scotland (1989), ISBN 0-06-016166-3
- My Holy War: Dispatches From the Home Front (2006), ISBN 1-59017-175-6
- Father and Son (2023), ISBN 9780375422454
