= Hunting Mister Heartbreak =

1990 travelogue by Jonathan Raban

Hunting Mister Heartbreak: A Discovery of America
- First edition
- Author: Jonathan Raban
- Publisher: Collins Harvill
- Publication date: 1990
- ISBN: 0-002-72031-0
- OCLC: 26314962

Hunting Mister Heartbreak: A Discovery of America is a travelogue of Jonathan Raban's personal rediscovery of America following in the footsteps of European immigrants. It won the 1991 Thomas Cook Travel Book Award.

== Introduction ==
Having arrived in Liverpool, I took a ship for the New World

For hundreds of years this sentence has tantalized and inspired Europeans. Jonathan Raban follows in the footsteps of Hector St John de Crevecouer - Mister Heartbreak and author of Letters from an American Farmer 1782)- and several million emigrants to discover America and the immigrant experience afresh. He sails from Liverpool docks to New York City and travels on to Alabama, Seattle, and the Florida Keys. Wherever he goes, there is a new identity to discover and a new life to live.

== Plot summary ==
In Hunting Mister Heartbreak, Raban sets off from the Port of Liverpool on board the 56,000 ton container ship Atlantic Conveyor, following in the footsteps of the first emigrants to America ("Having arrived in Liverpool, I took ship for the New World.") His meandering journey takes him to New York City, whose inhabitants he divides into the Street People - poor New Yorkers who have to face the daily threat of poverty and mugging - and the Air People - rich New Yorkers who rely on elevators to keep them off street level.

There were the Street People and there were the Air People. Air People levitated like fakirs. Large portions of their day were spent waiting for, and traveling in, the elevators that were as fundamental to the middle-class culture of New York as gondolas had been to Venice in the Renaissance. It was the big distinction - to be able to press a button and take wing to your apartment. It didn't matter that you lived on the sixth, the 16th or the 60th floor: access to the elevator was proof that your life had the buoyancy that was needed to stay afloat in a city where the ground was seen as the realm of failure and menace. (p. 80)

He leaves New York in distaste and proceeds in his hired car down to the Deep South, choosing to lie up for a time as a temporary resident of Guntersville, Alabama, a town which he immediately takes a liking to on one of his stopovers. He decides to devote some time to meeting the residents and absorbing the local lifestyle in his rented lakeside cabin in the company of Gypsy, an old black lab bitch on loan to scare off the anonymous caller who keeps on making threatening calls in the middle of the night. He then makes his way up to Seattle and rents a room in the Josephinum Residence. From here, he makes forays into the city and comes across some of the Korean immigrants who have struggled to carve out a new life for themselves in America. The books ends with Raban's search for the end of America in the Florida Keys, "the Land of Cockaigne". To fully explore and familiarise himself with the character of the Keys, he hires Sea Mist, a 32-foot sloop:

In this warm, wet, mazy world, nothing was what it seemed at first sight. It was a reflection, or a refraction. It was not to be trusted: the little hump-backed islet would suddenly sink beneath the surface and turn out to be a turtle; the dark hole in the sea would reveal itself - too late! - to be a coral head, as it ripped the bottom out of your unwary boat. To be a true denizen of the place, you needed to cultivate the twistiness and liquescence in your own character. You needed to take on the attributes of a watersnake. You needed, first of all, to be able to float. (p.379)
