= Coasting (book) =

Book by Jonathan Raban

- Author: Jonathan Raban
- Publisher: The Harvill Press
- Publication date: 1986
- ISBN: 0-671-45480-3
- OCLC: 14001637
- Dewey Decimal: 914.1/04858 19
- LC Class: DA632 .R33 1987

Coasting is a 1986 book by Jonathan Raban in which he sails around Great Britain while reflecting on the nation and his childhood.

== Plot summary ==
Written as a travelogue, Coasting describes Jonathan Raban's single-handed 4,000 mile voyage around Britain which he made in 1982 (at the age of 40) in an old restored 32-foot sea-going ketch, the Gosfield Maid. Raban sailed with a chart and a hand bearing-compass; he sailed by the look of the coastline. His story takes various digressions, just as his journey does, as he mulls over his childhood as the son of a vicar in the Church of England, and the current state of Britain under Margaret Thatcher during the time of the Falklands War.

Chapter Two is a description of the dogged insularity of the Manx, who he compares to the Falkland Islanders, whilst the Isle of Man becomes a metaphor for the insularity of the larger island on which he himself had been brought up and lived up till this point. Raban himself has commented on his own attitude to England and the influence of Thatcher on Britain at the time of writing his book. The British he sees as being famous for their insular arrogance and condescension. As he describes them:

They love fine social distinctions and divisions and are snobbishly wedded to an antique system of caste and class ... They are aggressively practical and philistine, with a loud contempt for anything that smells abstract or theoretical. They are a nation of moneygrubbers and bargain-hunters, treasuring pennies for treasuring's sake...When it comes to sex, they are furtive and hypocritical - and their erotic tastes are known to be extremely peculiar. Many Englishmen will pay a woman to take their trousers down and spank them...For the most part, though, the English, both men and women, are afflicted by such a morbid decay of their libido that it has always puzzled the rest of the world how the English manage to reproduce themselves at all.

The author is equally bitter about the dominant, hectoring Mrs Thatcher. Whilst comfortably moored up in the Gosfield Maid on a beautiful stretch of the River Yealm, he tunes into the House of Commons debate on the Falklands War. The Prime Minister talks about sovereign territory being invaded by a foreign power, but to Raban '...her cross, nanny's voice made it sound as if there had been ructions in the nursery and the children were going to be sent to bed without any tea.' He considers equally absurd the majority of MPs who are baying for Argentinian blood. Raban turns his radio off in disgust, '...sick of the sound of groaning men baying like a wolf pack. It wasn't a debate, it was a verbal bloodletting, with words standing for the guns and bayonets that would come later when the fleet reached the islands.' and adds, 'Listening to it, I felt that I'd been eavesdropping on the nastier workings of the national subconscious; I'd overheard Britain talking in a dream, and what it was saying scared me stiff.'

And it is his negative feelings towards an increasingly alien Britain under the dominance of Thatcher that finally persuade him to make the decision to leave his homeland, although the paradox is that they share a like-minded attitude towards its rigid social hierarchy:

I grew up with a sentimentalised version of the English past, of the enshrined holiness of the squire in the grand house and the tenant farmer and the exact place you occupied. I got ticked off by my father in my early teens if I was seen wandering down the street with a girl from the local secondary modern whom I had met at a church hop. You know: "Not your class, old boy" ... I have to say, however, that it was easy to leave England in 1990. I hated England under Thatcher, although in a funny way I shouldn't have. I mean, she was as antagonistic to the old system of England as I was.

Although unable to mix with council estate children because they were considered socially inferior, Raban was also out of place in upper class society since a vicar's stipend was about £700 a year, equal to that of a skilled labourer living on a council estate. 'We belonged nowhere, We had the money of one lot, the voices of another - and we had an unearthly goodliness which removed us from the social map altogether.'

During the journey, Raban encounters two literary figures. He has a rather hostile meeting with Paul Theroux at Brighton Marina, himself in the midst of researching a similar book about Britain, and a much friendlier one with Philip Larkin at Hull, a city Raban knows well from his student days while working as a part-time minicab driver.
