= Love of money =

Type of sin

In Christian tradition, the love of money is condemned as a sin primarily based on texts such as Ecclesiastes 5:10 and 1 Timothy 6:10. The Christian condemnation relates to avarice and greed rather than money itself. The Christian texts (scriptures) are full of parables and use easy-to-understand subjects, such as money, to convey the actual message, there are further parallels in Solon and Aristotle, and Massinissa—who ascribed love of money to Hannibal and the Carthaginians. Avarice is one of the seven deadly sins in the Christian classifications of vices (sins). This is a phrase that was borrowed from Diogenes.

== Judaism ==
Berachya Hanakdan lists "love of money" as a secular love, while Israel Salanter considers love of money for its own sake a non-universal inner force. A tale about Rabbi Avraham Yehoshua Heshel of Apt (1748–1825), rabbi in Iasi, recounts that he, who normally scorned money, had the habit of looking kindly on money before giving it to the poor at Purim, since only in valuing the gift could the gift express love of God. Berachot 54a teaches businessmen to "elevate their love of money to the same status as their love of God, which means that they should thereby love God enough to follow his commandment."

== Christianity ==
=== Source text ===
The original Koine Greek reads, ῥίζα γὰρ πάντων τῶν κακῶν ἐστιν ἡ φιλαργυρία (Rhiza gar pantōn tōn kakōn estin hē philargyria) — "for the root of all evils is the love of money."

The Greek word φιλαργυρία (philarghyría), from φιλία (philía- friendship) and άργυρος (árghyros- silver, money), can be translated as 'love of money'.

A popular current text, the King James Version shows 1 Timothy 6:10 to be:

For the love of money is the root of all of evil: which while some coveted after, they have erred from the faith, and pierced themselves through with many sorrows.

(The full verse is shown but Bold added being the subject of this page.)

Another popular text, the New International Version has "For the love of money is a root of all kinds of evil...."

During the Reformation, Martin Luther (1483–1546) translated the Latin Vulgate Bible into German, and 1 Timothy 6:10 "Die Habsucht ist die Wurzel allen Übels.;..."

Soon after Martin Luther's translation of the Bible to German, William Tyndale (1494–1536) did a similar translation into English as "For covetousness is the root of all evil;..."

The grammarian Daniel B. Wallace lists six alternative possible translations of the primary Greek text, 1 Timothy 6:10. There are two reasons for this: first, it is difficult to tell whether the noun "root" is intended to be indefinite, definite, or qualitative. Second, the Greek word for "all" may mean "all without exclusion" or "all without distinction". But by reading more verses either side of 1 Timothy 6:10 a greater surety and confidence that the message is the coveting and striving of greed for something on earth is the sin the Jews and Christians define, where money could be exchanged with anything else on the earth e.g. power. The opposite of greed is charity, each of the Seven deadly sins has a counterpart in the Seven virtues.

=== Cultural history ===
Augustine defines love of money as a subcategory of avarice. Luther referred to the love of money in strong accusations against the Catholic Church in his initial work of the Ninety-five Theses or Disputation on the Power of Indulgences. He saw the selling of an indulgence by the church, i.e. paying money to the church to gain a reduction of penalty of sins in purgatory (a belief unique to the Catholic church) as being more commercial greed of the church than it was doing actual good for the Christian person. Later in some sermons he shone the spotlight on commercial money lenders which happened to be Jewish and one can argue have anti-semitic undertones. However, more to the point is thesis 43 of the Ninety Five thesis "A Christian who gives to the poor or lends to those in need is doing better in God’s eyes than one who buys ‘forgiveness’ (buys an indulgence)"., as in a Jew who changed from being a money lender with greed to a money lender with charity would be doing better in God's eyes than simply purchasing a piece of paper that said they will spend less time in purgatory from Luther's point of view.

== See also ==
- Mammon
- Religious criticisms of capitalism
- Almighty dollar
- Gordon Gekko
- Ebenezer Scrooge
- Mr. Krabs
- Scrooge McDuck
