= Picador (imprint) =

International publishing imprint

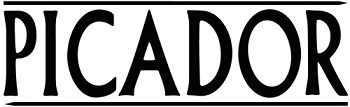
- Picador logo
- Parent company: Macmillan Publishers
- Founded: 1972; 54 years ago
- Country of origin: United Kingdom
- Headquarters location: London
- Publication types: Books
- Official website: picador.com

Picador is an imprint of Pan Macmillan in the United Kingdom and Australia and of Macmillan Publishing in the United States. Both companies are owned by Georg von Holtzbrinck Publishing Group.

Picador was launched in the UK in 1972 by publisher Sonny Mehta as a literary book series of Pan Books with the aim of publishing outstanding international writing in paperback editions only. In 1990, Picador started publishing its own hardcovers. Picador in the UK continues to publish fiction, nonfiction, and poetry from around the world, including works by former British Poet Laureate Carol Ann Duffy, Ted Hughes Award-winner Kae Tempest, and Booker Prize winner Douglas Stuart. Picador has also published commercial bestsellers such as Jessie Burton's The Miniaturist and Adam Kay's This is Going to Hurt .

In the summer of 2018, the US branch of Picador announced that starting in April 2019 it would no longer publish original titles and would focus exclusively on reprinting as trade paperbacks literary works originated by editors elsewhere at Macmillan.

Picador authors across the UK and the USA have included Jonathan Franzen, Michael Chabon, Marilynne Robinson, Angela Carter, Thomas Pynchon, Raj Patel, Jon Ronson, Alan Hollinghurst, Graham Swift, John Banville, Patrick McCabe, Tim Winton, Mick Jackson, Colm Toibin, Trezza Azzopardi, Edward St Aubyn, Emma Donoghue, Jim Crace, Sunjeev Sahota, Hanya Yanagihara, Pankaj Mishra, Bret Easton Ellis, Denis Johnson, Sir Salman Rushdie, Cormac McCarthy, Daniel Immerwahr, and Don Delillo.

== See also ==
- Picador Travel Classics
