= Travellers' Century =

- Genre: Documentary
- Written by: Benedict Allen
- Directed by: Harry Marshall; Richard Chambers
- Presented by: Benedict Allen
- Voices of: Geoffrey Palmer
- Country of origin: United Kingdom
- Original language: English
- No. of episodes: 3

Production
- Executive producers: Harry Marshall; Laura Marshall; Jacquie Hughes
- Producer: Andie Clare
- Running time: 60 minutes

Original release
- Network: BBC Four
- Release: 24 July – 7 August 2008

Travellers' Century is a 2008 BBC Television documentary series presented by Benedict Allen that profiles the lives of three influential 20th-century British travel writers.

== Production ==
BBC Four controller Janice Hadlow commissioned the series from Icon Films for broadcast as part of the channel's Journeys of Discovery season.

The series combines footage of explorer and travel writer Benedict Allen following in the footsteps of his subjects with interviews and archive footage to provide an insight into their lives.

Benedict Allen is the real McCoy and has boldly gone where very few have gone before. He is uniquely placed to reveal what these classic journeys tell us about travel and travellers and what makes the British such a restless race.

— Executive Producer Jacquie Hughes

Allen has written that the series was made to answer a question he had first asked himself when he lost his dog team in the Bering Strait pack ice and his prospects looked grim. Where does the troublesome urge of the British to wander off alone, often without even bothering to give a half-decent excuse, come from?

== Reception ==
Sarah Dempster writing in The Guardian describes the "wonderful little series" as "part leisurely biography, part arduous travelogue" that "offers an unabashedly nostalgic peek into the life of the 20th-century adventurer."

Tim Teeman writing in The Times described episode one as, "hopelessly muddled, slow and uninsightful", opining that "Allen managed to extinguish all the lyricism, and spirit of adventure and discovery, from Newby’s work," but concluding that "it was lovely to see Newby in archive footage cycle in the roiling morning commute, head high and defiantly and perilously weaving through the middle lane as beeping echoed all about him." Joe Clay writing in the same publication called it "a mature, inspiring hour of quintessentially British spirit."

== Episodes ==
I’ve spent 25 years heading off alone into deserts, and jungles and tundra; I’ve been to the last remote corners of our planet. Back in the 16th and 17th centuries, in the age of discovery, men set out to find whole new worlds. The 18th and 19th centuries was the era of exploration, when adventurers went to exploit these discoveries. The last century though was the age of the traveller, when the world was safe enough for individuals to make their own way, to set off and record their personal impressions; as it happens the British particularly loved to do this ... But why, and what does this say about us? Is it a legacy of the British Empire? Or perhaps being members of only a small off-shore nation we’ve learnt that we need to study the curious ways of foreigners in order to survive. Or are we just trying to escape what is, let’s face it, a very safe but overcrowded little island? I’m going to follow in the footsteps of those who I think are the three defining travel writers of our time and look through the brief and unique window they gave us onto the world and into themselves.

— Bennedict Allen's opening narration

=== Episode one: "Eric Newby" ===
Allen begins his film chatting with the attendees of Eric Newby's memorial service in Covent Garden. Newby's wife Wanda discusses the curiously British drive for exploration and Newby's split-personality of urbane and adventurous. Allen visits Newby's childhood home in Hammersmith where at St. Paul's School he reads of Newby's poor academic ability. Newby was unable to complete his studies and his friends Pat Allen, Katherine Whitehorn and Adrian House of the Travellers' Club ponder whether this drove him to prove himself by enlisting on the tea clipper Moshulu. Wanda relates how Newby's captioning of his photographs for publication resulted in The Last Grain Race.

On the eve of World War II Newby enlisted in the Black Watch and after Sandhurst he was captured on an SBS mission in Italy. Fellow POW Pat Spooner recalls Newby's positive attitude at this time when he first met his future wife. Wanda recalls after the war the couple joined the family costumier firm Lane and Newby where he indulged his passion for fashion but was ultimately unfulfilled. Allen meets Newby's old travelling companion Hugh Carless at Snowdonia where the two novice climbers spent weekend practising for an impromptu trip to Afghanistan. Wanda gives Allen Newby's bag as he sets off, with cameraman Peter Jouvenal, to follow in his footsteps.

Allen finds life in remote Nuristan little changed since Newby's time and the Panchea Valley and its inhabitants match his descriptions. Allen locates Newby's original guide who reminisces about Newby and Carliss and the impression that they made. Newby and Carliss never made it to the summit of Mir Samir but the author's self-deprecating style is best exemplified for Allen in his book of the trip A Short Walk in the Hindu Kush. Allen is also forced to turn back but pauses at the point where a historic meeting between Newby and the professional explorer Wilfred Thesiger symbolised the beginning of the age of the traveller.

=== Episode two: "Laurie Lee" ===
Explorer, writer and broadcaster Benedict Allen retraces part of author Laurie Lee's journey across Spain in 1935, which became the basis for his celebrated travelogue As I Walked Out One Midsummer Morning.

Lee thought of himself first and foremost as a poet, and the book reveals a poet's sensibility in its meticulous, distilled observations of the country and people he quickly came to love.

Allen tries to find out whether Lee's evocative prose actually works as travel writing and Lee is revealed as an enigmatic, mercurial figure in the tradition of the wandering minstrel or troubadour, with a huge array of talents and an astonishing facility to charm.

=== Episode three: "Patrick Leigh Fermor" ===
Benedict Allen follows Patrick Leigh Fermor's epic 1934 quest across Europe, tracing the inns, haystacks and castles the young adventurer stayed in as he foot-slogged his way through the Netherlands, Germany, Hungary and Romania towards Byzantium.

With his academic career punctuated by numerous school expulsions, the young Patrick Leigh Fermor put aside his troubles and set out across Europe to reach Constantinople in Turkey. It was the original backpacker journey, but also a quest in the romantic tradition of Lord Byron - that of the man of action and the intellectual combined.

His two accounts of that journey, A Time of Gifts and Between the Woods and the Water, are a masterly portrait of a Europe about to be swept aside by war, and also an insight into the brilliant, classically educated mind of the author.

It is in remotest Greece that Benedict Allen finally tracks down the great man himself to discuss the nature, purpose and future of travel writing.
