= HMS Una =

Submarine of the Royal Navy

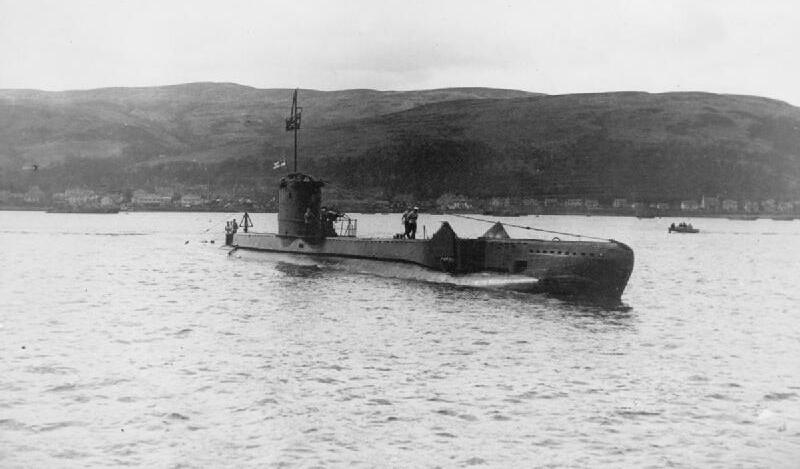
- HMS Una

History

United Kingdom
- Name: HMS Una
- Builder: Chatham Dockyard
- Laid down: 7 May 1940
- Launched: 10 June 1941
- Commissioned: 27 September 1941
- Decommissioned: November 1945
- Fate: Sold to be broken up for scrap, 11 April 1949
- Badge

General characteristics
- Class & type: U-class submarine
- Displacement: Surfaced - 540 tons standard, 630 tons full load; Submerged - 730 tons
- Length: 58.22 m (191 ft)
- Beam: 4.90 m (16 ft 1 in)
- Draught: 4.62 m (15 ft 2 in)
- Propulsion: 2 shaft diesel-electric; 2 Paxman Ricardo diesel generators + electric motors; 615 / 825 hp
- Speed: 11.25 knots (20.8 km/h) max surfaced; 10 knots (19 km/h) max submerged
- Complement: 27-31
- Armament: 4 bow internal 21 in (533 mm) torpedo tubes - 8 - 10 torpedoes; 1 - 3 in (76 mm) gun

HMS Una was a British U-class submarine, of the second group of that class, built at Chatham Dockyard. She was laid down on 7 May 1940 and was commissioned on 27 September 1941.

== Career ==
She spent most of her career operating in the Mediterranean from early 1942, where she sank the Italian tanker Lucania the Italian fishing vessel Maria Immacolata, and the Italian merchants Ninetto G. and Petrarca. Controversially, the Lucania was a tanker which had been granted immunity by the Admiralty, as she was to serve as a replenishment ship for an Italian ship repatriating civilians from East Africa; the submarine's commander, Lieutenant D.S.R. Martin, was ill and had not read the Admiralty signal before departure. She also damaged two sailing vessels and the Italian merchant Cosala (the former Yugoslavian Serafin Topic). The damaged Italian ship was grounded, but declared a total loss and eventually sank during a storm.

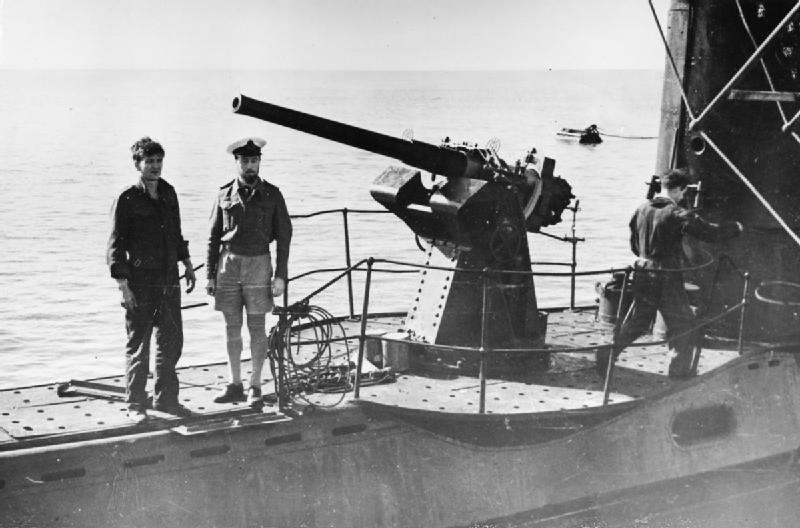
The 3-inch (76 mm) gun platform of HMS Una

She was unsuccessful on numerous occasions, including attacking the Italian merchant Brioni, the Italian tanker Panuco and the German merchant Menes. Una also fired torpedoes against a merchant in Lampedusa harbour. The torpedoes however hit the rocks.

In the night of 11/12 August 1942 disembarked a commando group on the shores of Catania, Sicily. The idea was to attack an airfield in support of Operation Pedestal, but after blowing up the electrical power lines between Syracuse and Catania, the dispirited group was taken prisoner. The unsuccessful raid was described by one of its members, Eric Newby, as the first chapter of his memoir Love and War in the Apennines.

From April to August 1943, she was used for Anti-Submarine training after undergoing a refit in the UK. After the end of the war, she was decommissioned and placed in reserve in November 1945. She was sold to be broken up for scrap on 11 April 1949 and scrapped at Llanelly.
