= Giorgio Cantarini =

Italian actor (born 1992)

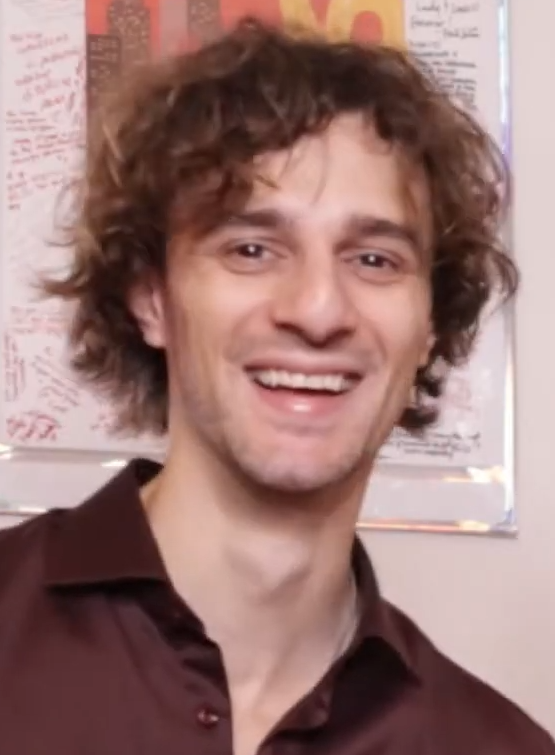
- Born: 12 April 1992 (age 34); Orvieto, Umbria, Italy
- Occupation: Actor
- Years active: 1997–present

Giorgio Cantarini (born 12 April 1992) is an Italian actor who, to date, has appeared in two Academy Award winning films: Life Is Beautiful (1997) and Gladiator (2000).

== Early life ==
Raised in Orvieto, Italy, Giorgio Cantarini was born to Giuseppe Cantarini and Giovanna Martini. The couple separated after Giorgio's fifth birthday.

== Career ==
Cantarini made his film debut in the 1997 Roberto Benigni directed comedy-drama Life is Beautiful, playing Benigni's four-year-old son Giosuè Orefice, who is sent with his Jewish-Italian father to a German concentration camp during World War II. The film won three Academy Awards. In 1998, Cantarini was nominated alongside his Life Is Beautiful castmates for the Screen Actors Guild Award for Outstanding Performance by a Cast in a Motion Picture and the same year he won the Young Artist Award.

His second film appearance was in the 2000 Ridley Scott-directed period action/drama Gladiator. Giorgio was cast as the son of Oscar-winning Russell Crowe's character 'Maximus'.

In 2001, Cantarini appeared in the Hallmark Hall of Fame American television film adaptation of author Eric Newby's autobiographical novel Love and War in the Apennines (retitled In Love and War) as 'Slavko'.

In 2005, Cantarini competed in the second season of Ballando con le Stelle, the Italian reality television version of the series Dancing With The Stars.

In January 2020, he appeared in the show "Lions don't hug" at the Hudson Guild Theater in Chelsea, New York.

== Personal life ==
Cantarini currently resides in New York City, where he is studying and performing.

== Filmography ==
Key
†	Denotes films that have not yet been released

=== Film ===
Year	Title	Role	Notes
1997	Life Is Beautiful	Giosuè Orefice	Nominated - Screen Actors Guild Award for Outstanding Performance by a Cast in a Motion Picture
2000	Gladiator	Maximus's son	
2000	In Love and War	Slavko	Television film
2007	Il giorno la notte poi l'alba	Giuseppe	
2008	Il mattino ha l'oro in bocca	—N/a	Short film
2015	Psicko Shakespeare	Amedeo Leto	Short film
2015	Dante's Project	Narrator	Direct-to-video
2018	Il dottore dei pesci	Luigi	Short film
2018	Ferrini	Bersagliere	Short film
2019	Giorno di gloria	Marcello	Short film
2022	Divine Comedy	Dante	Short film
2022	Lamborghini: The Man Behind the Legend	Giorgio Lamborghini	
2023	Comandante	Vezio Schiassi	
TBA	Hands Off My Granddaughters! †	Ali	Post-production

=== Television ===
Year	Title	Role	Notes
2015	AUS: Adotta uno studente	Himself	Episode: "Ecco cosa succede quando sbagli coinquilina"
