= A Small Place in Italy =

1994 memoir by Eric Newby

- First edition
- Author: Eric Newby
- Language: English
- Genre: Travel memoir, Autobiographical novel
- Publisher: HarperCollins
- Publication date: 1994
- Publication place: United Kingdom
- Media type: Print (hardback & paperback)
- Pages: 214 pp (first edition, hardback)
- ISBN: 0-00-215866-3 (first edition, hardback)
- OCLC: 30734418
- Dewey Decimal: 945/.5 20
- LC Class: DG735.6 .N49 1994

A Small Place in Italy is a travel memoir and autobiographical novel written by Eric Newby, author of The Last Grain Race, A Short Walk in the Hindu Kush and Slowly Down the Ganges. In 1967, Eric Newby and his wife Wanda acquire an old run-down farmhouse in Italy, I Castagni (The Chestnuts), in the foothills of the Apuan Alps on the borders of Liguria and northern Tuscany. The book is a personal memoir of the couple's experiences in renovating the house, which had a tileless roof, a long-abandoned septic tank and a wealth of indigenous flora and fauna, as well as a vivid description of their neighbours and the lifestyle of country people in Italy at that time.

== Plot summary ==
The Newbys want to purchase a house in Italy before house prices start rising and, through the help of contacts, finally purchase I Castagni for two and a half million lire (£1,500) after a long and laborious sales process with the owner, Signor Botti. Once they move in, they have to completely renovate everything, and are beset with various problems such as mice, a plague of cockroaches and an intractable neighbour who insists on using what he sees as a right of way for agricultural machinery that passes right outside the house - he even moves their outside dining table when he finds it blocking his path. The Newbys initiate a lawsuit against him which goes on for years owing to the dilapidated Italian legal system, but which they finally manage to win as a result of the man lying before the judge.

The strength of the book is in its descriptions of some of the neighbouring families and the individual family members. Their closest neighbour is a sprightly Italian widow, Signora Angiolina, who helps them navigate their way through the intricacies of social life in their neighbourhood, as well as the Dada family who own several acres of vineyards and cook stupendous meals whenever the Newbys visit them at the Casa Dada. There is a colourful description of the vendemmia, the annual grape harvest, during which Eric is roped into lifting bigonci, large barrel-shaped vessels full of crushed grapes, that nearly break his shoulder. Although the work is hard, there are merenda, consisting of huge outside picnics at which copious quantities of food are eaten, last year's wine drunk and bawdy gossip exchanged between the contadini. Another interesting description is when the Newbys join their neighbours in the annual funghi harvest in a bountiful year, managing to gather ten full baskets between the four of them (less successful is a harvesting of wild asparagus when Eric forgets his bifocals and cannot see anything).
