= Benedict Allen =

English traveller and filmmaker

- Born: Benedict Colin Allen; 1 March 1960 (age 65); Macclesfield, Cheshire, England
- Occupation(s): Author, Adventurer, Explorer, Film-maker
- Website: http://www.benedictallen.com/

Benedict Colin Allen FRGS (born 1 March 1960) is an English writer, explorer, traveller and filmmaker known for his technique of immersion among indigenous peoples from whom he acquires survival skills for hazardous journeys through unfamiliar terrain. In 2010, Allen was elected a Trustee and Member of Council of the Royal Geographical Society.

He has recorded six TV series for the BBC, either alone or with partial or total use of camera crews, and pioneered the use of the hand-held camera for TV, for the first time allowing viewers to witness immersion of a traveller in remote environments without the artifice brought about by a camera-crew.

He has published ten books, including the Faber Book of Exploration, which he edited.

Towards mid-November 2017, Allen became subject to international headlines when reported missing while undertaking an expedition in Papua New Guinea. However, he resurfaced not long after, having made his way to an abandoned mission station.

== Early life and education ==
Benedict Allen was born in Macclesfield, Cheshire, third child to Virginia and Colin Allen – who had moved from Southern England in order to be a short drive from Woodford Aerodrome, where Colin was a test pilot for Avro and later Hawker Siddeley, helping develop the three V-bombers (Valiant, Victor and Vulcan Mark 2).

His son, Benedict, is first cousin and godson to the historian and writer on India Charles Allen, who was one of those who passed on a sense that there was still an exciting world out there waiting to be understood and explored.

As a child, Benedict Allen embarked on numerous fossil-hunting expeditions to Lyme Regis, Dorset, and along England's Jurassic Coast. Among more famous influences in his early years were Wilfred Thesiger, Laurens van der Post, Jacques-Yves Cousteau, Thor Heyerdahl and naturalist Peter Matthiessen, all of whom he in due course met.

Allen has two older sisters, Katie and Susie. He was educated at Bradfield College, and read environmental science at the University of East Anglia, participating in three scientific expeditions during his final year. Although he went on to study for a master's degree in ecology he did not complete his second degree, being intent by now only on his first independent expedition, an attempt to cross from the mouth of the Orinoco to the mouth of the Amazon that would mean a first traverse of the Amazon Basin's remote north-east. His claim to have completed the traverse – a journey undertaken with the assistance of locals through some four hundred miles of forest, and in a matter of only a few months, was at the time met with incredulity.

== Philosophy and approach ==
A feature of Allen's expeditions is that they are conducted without Western companions, without a phone or GPS but instead rely where possible on indigenous help, rather than conventional backup from the outside world. "To me personally, exploration is not about planting a flag, or conquering a nature, or going somewhere in order to make a mark. It's the opposite of these things. It's about opening yourself up, allowing yourself to be vulnerable, and allowing the place to make its mark on you." As portrayed by one interviewer, he has "little time" for flag-planting, or any "imperialist craving for the acquisition of territory".

This approach – "If you go with a map, all you'll end up with is a better version of that same map" – in his case meant making a decision early on not be endorsed by commercial sponsors or be a brand ambassador – the advertising of consumer products sitting uncomfortably with the idea of immersing oneself within an indigenous community in order to listen and learn.

After publishing five books describing his various lone journeys across the least explored regions of the Amazon, New Guinea and Sumatra, in the mid-1990s Allen went on to develop the now commonly adopted technique of self-filming with a camcorder, becoming the first (and for many years the only) adventurer to document the experience of immersion in a community or of undergoing a testing journey – through such programmes as The Skeleton Coast, which depicted a first known expedition by foot along the complete length of the 1,000-mile Namib Desert. A Radio Times cover feature dubbed him "Television's Most Fearless Man".

== Patronage ==
Allen is a Patron of the Environmental Justice Foundation, Tony Trust and Save the Rhino Trust.

== Expeditions ==
While still a student, Allen took part in scientific expeditions to a volcano in Costa Rica, to a remote forest in Brunei, and – as leader – to a glacier in Iceland. He went on to establish his reputation through a series of independent journeys to cross through the least known regions of the Amazon and New Guinea. Travelling without Western companions or communication devices, he trusted instead to the know-how of various local communities, making first outside contact with two threatened indigenous peoples – the Obini and Yaifo.

Today Allen is acknowledged as one of the last great adventurers in the classic mould, The Daily Telegraph listing him as one of the top ten British explorers of all time, the only other living individual being Sir Ranulph Fiennes. He went on to develop the technique of self-filming, becoming the first explorer to bring the full experience of remote travel to television, and in dispensing with a traditional, more cumbersome, camera (and crew) effectively took the entire genre to its limits – while also inadvertently popularizing idea of the "video selfie". He was described as "part of the history of television" by former Director General of the BBC Mark Thompson.

Allen's first major exploit was a first crossing of the northeast Amazon basin in 1983; he traversed 417 miles of rainforest on foot and by dugout canoe over several months – a precarious journey that covered the proposed route of the then planned Perimetral Norte Road through Brazil's Para and Amapa States. In the event, the venture almost cost him his life – he was chased by renegade goldminers, capsized and ended up walking out of the forest some 65 miles with two strains of malaria, a dramatic sequence of events featured in an I Shouldn't Be Alive episode aired in 2010. His own portrayal of the journey, his 1985 book, Mad White Giant, was designed to read at one level as a rip-roaring adventure, and at another as an angry attack on his own kind. It was this formative experience which saw Allen establish his modus operandi: rather than again blunder along as an outsider – the "mad white giant" of his first book – he would attempt to learn from his hosts. There followed a series of treks with the help of remote communities through West Papua and Papua New Guinea, culminating in his participation in a brutal initiation ceremony of the Niowra (Into the Crocodile's Nest) people of the lowland Sepik.

In Siberut and Sumatra he investigated indigenous tales of an "orang pendek" ape man, this time assisted by the Mentawai and Kubu (Hunting the Gugu) – and in 1987, aged twenty-seven, made the first recorded crossing of the Central Range of PNG, helped by one of the last of the island's uncontacted communities, a small band known as the Yaifo (The Proving Grounds).

In 1992 Allen conducted the first crossing of the Amazon basin at its widest, a seven and half month, 3600 mile journey from the Andes of Ecuador, south-east to the lowlands to Mato Grosso, this time trained by the Matses or Mayoruna ethnic group of the Peruvian Amazon (Through Jaguar Eyes).

Two years later he returned to the Matses family which had adopted him, with the help of a camcorder filming Raiders of the Lost Lake, a deliberate reprise of the traveller-as-intruder themes of Mad White Giant. For the first time the moment by moment progress of a lone and authentically dangerous expedition could be seen by millions.

Soon after, he was given first-ever permission to travel the length of the diamond-strewn (and environmentally sensitive) Namib Desert, a three and a half month long journey he accomplished in 1996 with the collaboration of the Namibian Nature Conservancy, his three camel companions and the Himba nomads of the Namib margins (The Skeleton Coast).

The following year, Allen undertook a 3000-mile, five and a half month journey by horse and camel around Mongolia, this including a lone six week traverse of the Gobi Desert (Edge of Blue Heaven).

In 1998 he returned to Brazil's Mato Grosso to learn the point-of-view of the Kalapalo, an indigenous community who for years had stood accused of murdering the explorer Colonel Percy Fawcett, his son Jack and Jack's friend Raleigh Rimmel – all of whom had disappeared on Fawcett's expedition of 1925 (The Bones of Colonel Fawcett).

Two years later, Allen documented encounters with spiritual healers around the globe – including Voodoo priests in Haiti, the Mentawai of Indonesia, the Huichol of Mexico and shamans of Siberia, this resulting in the 2000 BBC book and TV series Last of the Medicine Men.

There followed the 'Icedogs' expedition of 2000/2001: with training and assistance of the Yupik and Chukchi communities of Chukotka in the Russian Far East, and special permission from the governor of the time, oligarch and future Chelsea Football Club owner Roman Abramovich, Allen attempted to cross the Bering Strait to Alaska in what turned out to be 'the worst winter in living memory' – and out on the pack-ice nearly died having been separated from his dog team in a blizzard (Ice Dogs). Following this latest brush with mortality, Allen made a decision to end his expedition career, which has taken him from rain forest to desert and now the Arctic – 'as if seeking greater and greater extremes. And perhaps I was.'

Allen married and had the first of three children. Thereafter, he presented and wrote Traveller's Century, a three part TV programme for BBC 2 and BBC 4 which examined the lives of three travellers in the extraordinarily prolific British tradition. Eric Newby personified the Amateur Abroad, who revels in his very lack of preparedness and sets out regardless. Laurie Lee represented the Wandering Minstrel, and Patrick Leigh Fermor was the Bryronic figure of daring and intellect combined. Leigh Fermor gave his last ever recorded interview for the TV series.

Allen went on to assist BBC Security Correspondent Frank Gardner in his bid to see birds of paradise in the wild, the result being Birds of Paradise: The Ultimate Quest. It was on this expedition that Allen by chance heard that the Yaifo community that he had known more than thirty years before, and long thought disintegrated under the influence of missionary and wholesale goldmining activity, were still living in relative isolation on the mountain side. He decided to do just "one last" expedition.

== Disappearance in Papua New Guinea ==
On 26 October 2017, Allen had himself dropped by helicopter at Bisorio Mission, East Sepik Province, then launched with a party of indigenous contacts for a three-week trek into the forest, hoping to track down the Yaifo, check up on their well-being, and thank those who had originally helped him over the mountain. Having successfully located the community, and then completed a gruelling trek for a second time over the Central Range, Allen found himself trapped by an upsurge of community violence just north of the international mining concern at Porgera in Enga Province. Over the following days, media outlets around the world speculated as to his fate. However, on 17 November he was extracted by the Daily Mail newspaper, and taken to hospital with suspected malaria and dengue fever.

== Books ==
=== As author ===
- Mad White Giant (1985, published in America as Who Goes Out in the Midday Sun?)
- Into the Crocodile's Nest: Journey Inside New Guinea (1987)
- Hunting the Gugu: In Search of the Lost Ape-Men of Sumatra (1989)
- The Proving Grounds: A Journey Through the Interior of New Guinea and Australia (1991)
- Through Jaguar Eyes: Crossing the Amazon Basin (1994)
- The Skeleton Coast (1997)
- The Edge of Blue Heaven (1998)
- Last of the Medicine Men (2000)
- Into the Abyss (2006)

=== As contributor ===
- More Great Railway Journeys (1996)

=== As editor ===
- The Faber Book of Exploration: An Anthology of Worlds Revealed by Explorers Through the Ages (2002)

== TV series ==
- The Skeleton Coast (BBC, 1997)
- The Edge of Blue Heaven (BBC, 1998)
- The Bones of Colonel Fawcett (BBC, 1999)
- Last of the Medicine Men (BBC, 1999)
- Ice Dogs (BBC, 2002, National Geographic 2003)
- Travellers' Century (BBC, 2008)
- Unbreakable (Five, 2008)
- Expedition Africa (Sky History, 2009)

=== Other TV programmes ===
- The Raiders of the Lost Lake (BBC 2, Video Diary, 1995). A journey to the Upper Yavari in the Peruvian Amazon, where a Matses family had adopted him, and a lone trek to the mysterious (and locally feared) 'Cocha Brava' or Wild Lake.
- More Great Railway Journeys: Mombasa to the Mountains of the Moon (1996, BBC 2) . Through Kenya to Uganda; encounters in contemporary East Africa.
- Adventures For Boys: the lost worlds of Rider Haggard (2007, BBC 4). Profile of the author of King Solomon's Mines and She.
- Birds of Paradise: The Ultimate Quest.

== Other TV broadcasts include ==
- The Big Read, in which Allen championed His Dark Materials by Philip Pullman – a book that came third out of the nation's top 100 novels.
- We Need Answers, 25 February 2010, A British comedy panel show broadcast on BBC Four.
- I Shouldn't Be Alive: Alone in the Amazon

== Radio broadcasts include ==
Two Men and a Mule. A BBC Radio 4 series co-presented by historian and explorer Hugh Thomson, the three part programme plots the two men's progress though the Andes along the trail of the last Inca emperors. Broadcast 2, 9 16 October 2015.

== Work on other travellers ==
- The Faber Book of Exploration: an anthology of worlds revealed by explorers through the ages – brings together the lives of key explorers of different motivations, traditions and nationalities through the centuries. 'This is a major work,' according to Condé Nast Traveller, 'and it should be on every traveller's bookshelf.'
- In 2006 Allen published Into the Abyss, which tells the story of his Arctic sledge dog expedition but also attempts to address the question of how any of us keep going in adversity.
- His recollections of Wilfred Thesiger, perhaps the greatest explorer of the 20th century, are included in Wilfred Thesiger in Africa edited by Christopher Morton and Philip N. Grover, London: HarperPress, 2010
