= Mir Samir =

Mountain in the Hindu Kush

- میر سمیر
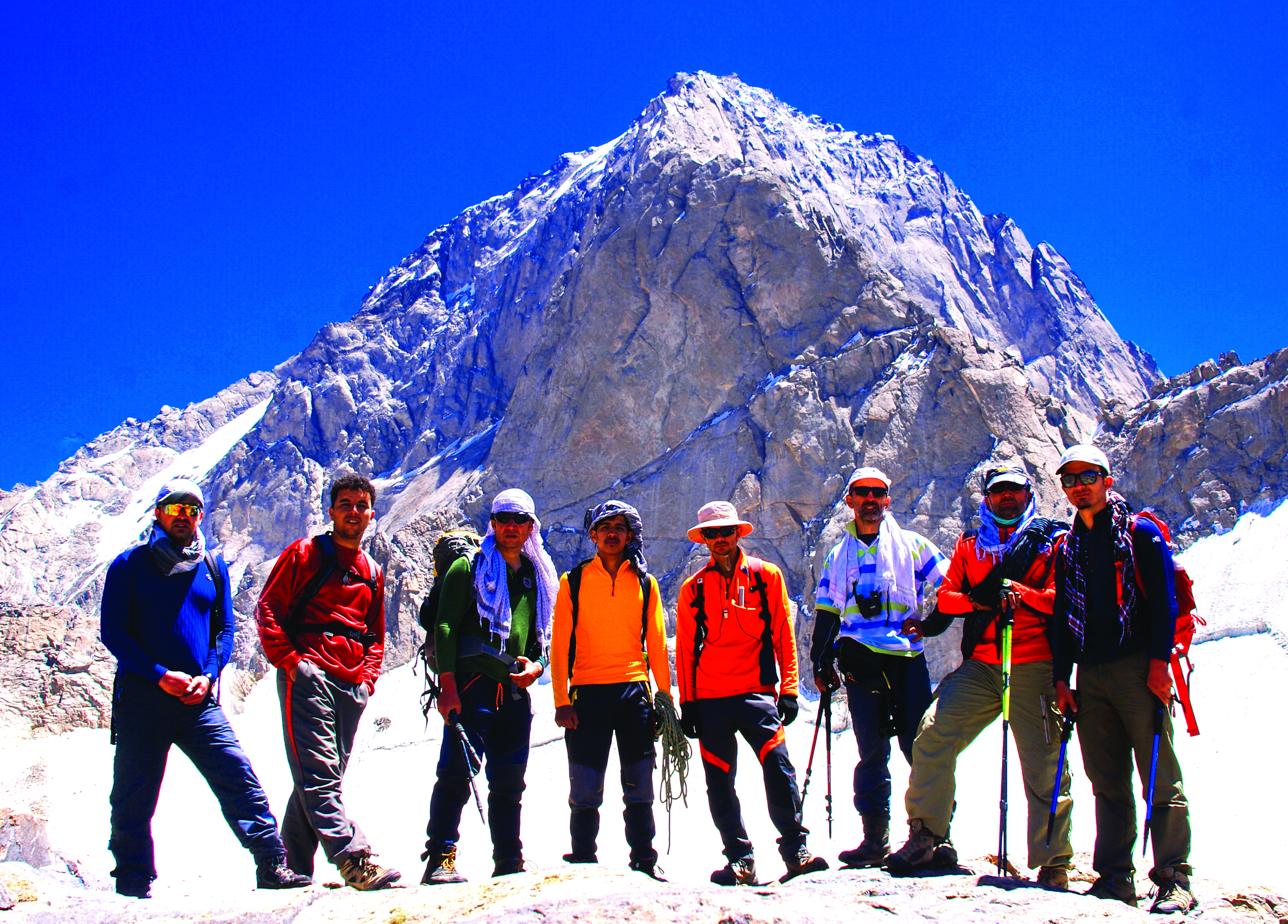

Highest point
- Elevation: 5,809 m (19,058 ft)
- Coordinates: 35°35′17″N 70°09′56″E

Geography
- Location within Afghanistan
- Location: Afghanistan
- Province: Panjshir
- Parent range: Hindu Kush

Climbing
- First ascent: Harald Biller, 1959

Mir Samir, (Note: Pashto: میر سمیر Dari: میر سمیر) also called Mir Simir, is a mountain in the Hindu Kush in Afghanistan. The English traveller Eric Newby and the diplomat Hugh Carless attempted to climb Mir Samir in 1956, but they could not reach the main peak, as described in the book A Short Walk in the Hindu Kush. The first successful ascent was in 1959 despite a local tradition that it was unclimbable.

== Geography ==
Mir Samir lies on the east side of the upper Panjshir Valley, Afghanistan and the border of Nuristan. It is about 90 miles (150 km) due north of the city of Jalalabad as the crow flies, and more practically about 100 miles (160 km) northeastwards up the Panjshir Valley from the town of Charikar.

Until 1966, Mir Samir was thought to be 19,878 ft (6,059m) high, but its height has been revised down to 19,058 ft (5,809m).

Afghanistan was surveyed by the British during the Second Afghan War of 1878–1880. However the surveyors had to work under fire, and were unable to cross the Hindu Kush. The surveyor Mr. Scott was able to climb the 15,620 ft mountain Sikaram in the Safid Koh, from where he noted to the north "a pyramid standing far above the heads of all the surrounding peaks of the Hindu Kush". The mountaineer Boleslaw Chwascinski writes that this was "most probably" Mir Samir.

== Mountaineering ==
In his An Unexpected Light: Travels in Afghanistan, Jason Elliot records that Afghan villagers believed that "Mir Samir could not be climbed by man", which was the reason that foreigners who had attempted the climb had not succeeded.

Eric Newby and Hugh Carless "almost climbed" in 1956 but could not reach the main peak, as described in Newby's humorous A Short Walk in the Hindu Kush, although in mountaineering terms their reconnaissance of the Central Hindu Kush was later dismissed as a "negligible effort". For Newby, his first sight of the mountain "was awe-inspiring enough. Mir Samir, seen from the west, was a triangle with a sheer face."

Harald Biller, the leader of the 1959 Nürnberg Hindu Kush Reconnaissance expedition, climbed Mir Samir together with his wife and two companions on 24 July 1959 encountering Grade V rock pitches. The mountain was believed at that time to be 6,059 metres high. Biller's expedition was not only the first expedition of Mir Samir but "the first expedition of a great peak in Afghanistan." Several unsuccessful attempts were made also at a second ascent; the 1965 Hitotsubashi University H.K. Expedition, led by Jiro Amori, also failed on 26 August 1965 despite using a new route.

In January 2012, an expedition under the auspices of the British Mountaineering Council attempted the first winter ascent of Mir Samir, but it was cut short by equipment theft and deep snow.

After that up to 10 expeditions from different international climbers unsuccessfully attempted to climb Mir Samir. In 2017, 8 Afghan climbers led by Zabih Afzali tried to climb Mir Samir; he tried again and reached 5749 metres in 2021 but lost his life.
