= White Giant =

White Giant may refer to:

- Giant star#Blue giants – Type of star, larger and brighter than the Sun
- Mad White Giant – 1985 semi-autobiographical adventure novel by Benedict Allen
- Operation White Giant – Offensive in the Congo Crisis
