= Yaifo =

Remote tribe of Papua New Guinea

The Yaifo people are a remote tribe in the East Sepik Province of Papua New Guinea in the highlands. The tribe was described by British writer, broadcaster and explorer, Benedict Allen, in his account of a 1988 expedition, The Proving Grounds: A Journey through the Interior of New Guinea and Australia (1991).

== Location ==
The Yaifo tribe is listed by the International fund for agricultural development (IFAD) among the tribes and clans of Simbu and East Sepik. The tribe is visited very infrequently and are among the remotest people in Papua New Guinea. They are one of the few tribes of people on earth who do not maintain contact with the outside world. The village of Yaipo in East Sepik Province is listed as speaking a dialect of the Nete language, which lenites consonants between vowels suggesting a pronunciation of /jaiɸo/.

== Contact with other cultures ==
The tribe was visited in 1988 by explorer Benedict Allen. In November 2017, it was reported that Allen had gone missing while planning a second visit to the tribe, but was later rescued unharmed. In his encounter with the tribe for the first time 30 years ago, he wrote that he was greeted with, "a terrifying show of strength" and an energetic dance in which they displayed their bows and arrows.

== See also ==
- Uncontacted peoples
- Sentinelese
- Mashco Piro
- Indigenous peoples
- Tribe
