= In Love and War (2001 film) =

- Written by: Eric Newby; John Mortimer
- Directed by: John Kent Harrison
- Starring: Callum Blue; Barbora Bobuľová
- Music by: Nicola Piovani
- Country of origin: United States
- Original language: English

Production
- Producer: Andrew Gottlieb
- Cinematography: Giovanni Fiore Coltellacci
- Editor: Michael Ornstein
- Running time: 90 minutes
- Production company: Hallmark Hall of Fame Productions

Original release
- Network: CBS
- Release: November 18, 2001

In Love and War is a Hallmark Hall of Fame TV movie, directed by John Kent Harrison. It is based on the 1971 book Love and War in the Apennines by Eric Newby. It was filmed in Italy and stars Callum Blue and Barbora Bobuľová. The presentation aired on CBS on November 18, 2001.

== Plot ==
Eric Newby is an English soldier in 1943, captured by the Germans and imprisoned in a former mansion in Italy. The mansion is beautiful, Prisoners are well fed and receive Red Cross packages regularly. While Wanda and her Italian girl friends bicycle past the mansion, Eric spots her, and she returns his glances. In one of the packages, Eric claims an Italian language book. Wanda finds her way into the prisoner section as an Italian language mentor. Of course, Eric becomes her student. Sometime later, Eric and others escape, and Wanda finds him. She leads him north, thinking he will escape to Switzerland. They find their way to an Italian farm. Eric is taken in by the family, made to look like an Italian (vs. Englishman), and remains on the farm as a farm worker.

But the Nazi soldiers are searching for the escaped prisoners. The local people build a secret small residence in the surrounding hills to hide Eric. The Nazi soldiers arrive with tracking dogs and discover Eric’s hideout. Eric and Wanda are hiding in the nearby rocks.

Not wanting Wanda to get into trouble, Eric presents himself to the German soldiers, allowing Wanda to remain hidden. Eric is returned to a prison. 2 years later, when the war is declared over, Eric returns to Wanda’s town. As he exits the bus, he is unsure where to go. Wanda spots him at the bus stop and they run into each other’s arms.

== Cast ==
- Callum Blue as Eric Newby - Enrico
- Barbora Bobuľová as Wanda Skof
- Peter Bowles as John Melville
- Nick Reding as James
- John Warnaby as Feathers
- Toby Jones as Bolo
- Robert Weatherby as Butler
- Nicholas Gallagher as Duffy
- Mark Whiteley as Bob
- Maurizio Donadoni as Vincenzo
- Rosa Pianeta as Rosa - Vincenzo's wife
- Bianca Nappi as Dolores - Vincenzo's daughter
- Emanuela Macchniz as Bianca - Vincenzo's daughter
- Silvia De Santis as Valeria
- Roberto Nobile as Wanda's Father Skof
- Madlena Nedeva as Wanda's Mother Skof
- Giorgio Cantarini as Slavko
- Oreste Rotundo as the Doctor
- Nicola Pannelli as Maurizio
- Marco Quaglia as Giuseppe
- Massimo Sarchielli as Merily
- Orazio Stracuzzi as Baruffa
- Rosa Di Brigida as Mrs. Baruffa
- Franco Ravera as Osvaldor
- Jan Stahlberg as German Lt.
- Mario Erpichini as Chairman
- Victoria Zinny As Mother Superior
- Roberto Fiorentini as Housekeeper
- Ralph Palka as German officer
