= Unbreakable (TV series) =

2008 reality television series

- Created by: Ricochet
- Directed by: Leo McCrea
- Presented by: Benedict Allen
- Country of origin: United Kingdom
- Original language: English
- No. of series: 1
- No. of episodes: 8

Production
- Executive producer: Chris Kelly
- Producer: Mark Carter
- Production locations: Everglades; Guyana; Norway; Sahara; South Africa
- Running time: 45 Minutes

Original release
- Network: Channel 5
- Release: 6 October – 24 November 2008

Unbreakable is a 2008 reality television series presented by explorer Benedict Allen on UK's Channel 5, where eight volunteers undergo an onslaught of physical and mental pressure in a bid to be declared unbreakable.

In settings including the Norwegian arctic and the Sahara Desert, the volunteers learned to survive in harsh environments and were given military training. Their goal was to outlast each other.

== Contestants ==
Name	Occupation	Hometown	Unbreakable?
Frazer Herald	Ironman	Liverpool	Unbreakable
Angus Morrison	Professional Skier	Lesmahagow	Unbreakable
Matthew Taylor	Gym instructor / Rugby player	Gloucestershire	Unbreakable
Barnaby Race	Musician / Long distance runner	Canterbury	Broken (Week 8)
David Bain	Ex-professional boxer	Wolverhampton	Broken (Week 8)
Carla Terry	Personal Trainer	Surrey	Broken (Week 5)
Heather Lyons	Bouncer / Martial arts champion	Cardiff	Broken (Week 2)
Nathan Roberts	Bodybuilder	Folkestone	Broken (Week 1)

== Episodes ==
=== Episode 1 ===
The jungle of Guyana. They're spurred on by Mark Billingham, a jungle warfare instructor who served with the British SAS for 27 years. They also face challenges inspired by a tribe of former cannibals.

=== Episode 2 ===
Norwegian School of Winter Warfare in Norway. They are placed in the vicinity of a TNT explosion and forced to jump into an ice hole while still wearing their skis. During the nights they were required to dig a snow holes and sleep in them.

=== Episode 3 ===
The Royal Navy. After a week's training in Portsmouth, they go aboard HMS Belfast on nearby Whale Island and face simulations of both a sinking under heavy gunfire and a terrifying helicopter crash. After disorientation and freezing temperatures, their final challenge is a two assault course challenge including the disassembling of a 1,250lb gun.

=== Episode 4 ===
Sahara Desert. They find themselves at the mercy of The French Foreign Legion. Taking them into the Sahara, they subject them to a series of gruelling challenges, including being buried alive, a 10-kilometre camel race, and an exhausting run over the sand dunes while wearing stifling gas masks.

=== Episode 5 ===
US Navy SEALs. They travel to Virginia to carry out "simulated" Navy SEAL training with some former US Navy SEALs, whose beach-based challenges from long beach runs to "surf torture" leave them physically and emotionally drained. After the first day, Carla suffers from dehydration and exhaustion, but must face her fear of water in a drownproofing challenge where the volunteers repeatedly sink in a pool with their ankles and wrists bound.

=== Episode 6 ===
In the Everglades. Participants will share the territory with two million alligators and 60 species of venomous snake, accompanied by a Native American guide. “My name is not important to you,” he sneers. “But you will call me Teacher.” They have to cut then open an alligator and remove its entrails with their bare hands. They canoe across alligator-infested waters, wrestle alligators, and play lacrosse.

=== Episode 7 ===
South Africa. They are required to take on the might of highly trained Zulu warriors in a series of stick-fighting contests. However, before they are deemed worthy of battle, the contenders must first prove themselves by stealing honey from wild bees, and participate in a body cleansing ritual.

=== Episode 8 ===
The unbreakables are handed over to The South African Elite Fighting Force, ex-special forces instructors who teach African armies the reality of warfare. The unbreakables are woken before dawn to find that Barnaby has vanished, but the unbreakables along with the South African elite forces find him, and he is told that he is broken.

After David Bain has proven himself the strongest boxer among those remaining, he breaks while being buried alive, blaming it on his claustrophobia.

Against all odds, the 3 remaining, Frasier, Angus and Matt manage to reach the finish and are considered 'Unbreakable'.

Episode 8 was not available on Channel 5's Player due to copyright and contractual reasons.
