= Mad White Giant =

1985 semi-autobiographical adventure novel by Benedict Allen

- First edition
- Author: Benedict Allen
- Language: English
- Genre: adventure
- Publisher: MacMillan (UK,1985); Flamingo (1992); Faber and Faber (2002)
- Publication date: 1985
- Publication place: United Kingdom
- Media type: Print (paperback and hardback)
- Pages: 256
- ISBN: 978-0-571-20617-9
- OCLC: 48932697

Mad White Giant: A Journey to the Heart of the Amazon Jungle is a 1985 semi-autobiographical adventure novel by British explorer and author Benedict Allen. It details Allen's travels between the mouths of the Orinoco and the Amazon rivers. In the United States, the novel was published under the title Who Goes Out In The Midday Sun?

== Plot ==
Mad White Giant begins with Allen recounting the role of Amazonia in his childhood fantasies. The novel then describes the author's travels between the Orinoco and the Amazon rivers, a trip of over 1500 miles. During his travels, he befriends natives who refer to him as "Mad White Giant", or by his preferred nickname Louco Benedito.

Allen is later abandoned by his two Carib companions, Yepe and Pim, who go to work for Brazilian miners. Allen also adopts a dog, named Cashoe (meaning 'dog' in one of the Indian dialects), whose actions capsize Allen's canoe and leave him stranded in the Amazonian jungle. After a grueling period of starvation, recounted as a series of diary entries (actually written in one sitting), Allen decides to shoot and eat Cashoe to survive.

== Reception ==
The publication of Mad White Giant was greeted with some controversy. Allen was visited by two RSPCA inspectors who inquired about the welfare of his family pets. Several commentators doubted that Allen could have travelled his reported route within three months, leading to the cancellation of a lecture he was to give to the Royal Geographical Society. Allen admits that Mad White Giant is "unreliable" in terms of factual detail, a deliberate bid to distance his novel from the traditional travelogue genre. He also attributes any potential inaccuracies to the loss of his notes in a canoe capsizing, and in changes made to protect a travelling companion. Allen stated of his novel's integrity:

I think of myself as a very truthful person and it upsets me if people think I'm a fraud. The book wasn't meant to be a scientific document. It was an adventure story which veiled an angry cry against what the white man has done and how we are going about exploiting these places. [...] I felt I was being criticised for writing about a very real journey as if it was a standard travelogue, which it quite clearly wasn't.

Douglas Ivison considers Mad White Giant to be written "within a tradition of British writing, in which boys had to venture out to the colonies in order to learn to become men." He further argues, however, that Allen achieves a "transcendence" that distances his writing from the "imperialist and capitalist, even patriarchal, discourses in which it is embedded."
