= Rick Skwiot =

American novelist

Rick Skwiot is the award-winning author of three published works set in Mexico and a critically praised childhood memoir. He received the Hemingway First Novel Award for his debut work, Death in Mexico (formerly titled Flesh) and was the Willa Cather Fiction Prize Finalist for Sleeping With Pancho Villa in 1998. In addition, he has published numerous feature stories, short stories, essays, and book reviews in magazines and newspapers. Skwiot has taught creative writing at Washington University in St. Louis and at the University of Missouri-St. Louis, where he served as the 2004 Distinguished Visiting Writer.

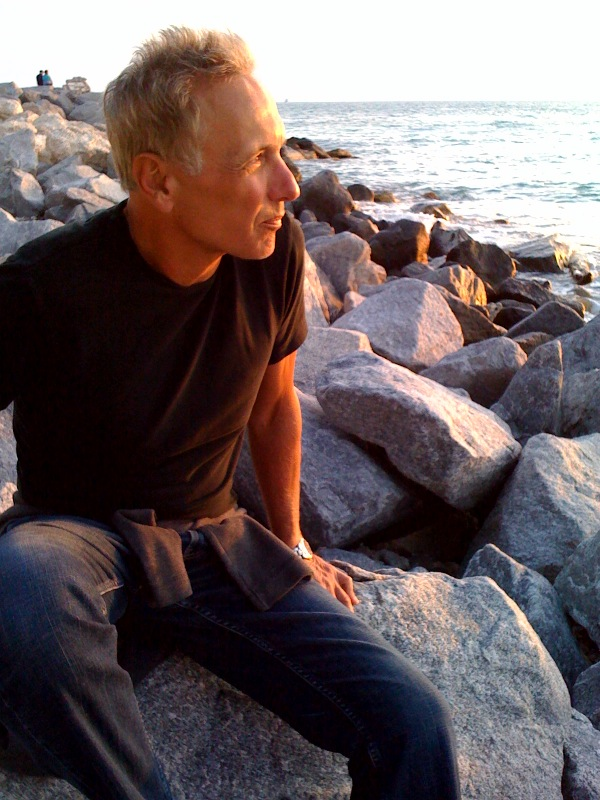
Rick Skwiot

A St. Louis native, he earned a B.A. in sociology from the University of Missouri–St. Louis, an M.A. in English literature from the University of Missouri-Columbia, and an M.F.A. in creative writing from Old Dominion University.

When an infant his family moved across the Mississippi River from north St. Louis to rural Madison County, Illinois, which serves as the setting for his acclaimed childhood memoir Christmas at Long Lake. His mystery novel, FAIL, details political corruption and educational malpractice in St. Louis. Skwiot began his writing career as a newspaper reporter in MetroEast St. Louis. He spent much of the 1980s in Mexico, a setting that has figured importantly in both his fiction and nonfiction work. He now lives in Key West, Florida, the locale of his adventure novel, Key West Story, which prominently features a young Ernest Hemingway, who returns as a spirit to guide a struggling writer.

== His published work includes ==
- The Bootlegger's Bride, Amphorae Publishing Group (July 2025).
- FAIL, Blank Slate Press (October 2014).
- Key West Story, Antaeus Books (February 2012).
- San Miguel de Allende, Mexico | Memoir of a Sensual Quest for Spiritual Healing, Antaeus Books, Inc. (August 2010).
- Christmas at Long Lake : A childhood memoir, First edition, All Nations Press (2004), Second edition, Antaeus Books, Inc. (September 2010).
- Sleeping With Pancho Villa, First Edition, Colorado University Press, 1999, Willa Cather Fiction Prize Finalist. Second Edition, Antaeus Books, Inc. (October 2010).
- Death in Mexico, Eaton Street Press; First edition titled Flesh (August 1998),Winner, Hemingway First Novel Award. Second Edition, Antaeus Books, Inc. (November 2010).
