= The Last Grain Race =

1956 book by Eric Newby

- First edition (UK)
- Author: Eric Newby
- Language: English
- Genre: Sailing
- Publisher: Secker & Warburg (UK); Houghton Mifflin (US)
- Pages: 244

The Last Grain Race is a 1956 book by Eric Newby, a travel writer, about his time spent on the four-masted steel barque Moshulu during the vessel's last voyage in the Australian grain trade.

== Background to the book ==
In 1938 the 18-year-old Newby shipped aboard the four-masted barque Moshulu as an apprentice. His outbound passage from Europe to Australia was via the Cape of Good Hope. His return was around Cape Horn. The Moshulu was at the time one of the largest sailing ships still transporting grain.

While 1939 was arguably the last Grain race worthy of the name, as it was followed by World War II and the consequent near-total interruption of commercial shipping, commercial sailing ships still sailed the route after the war for two more years in 1948 and 1949.

== Summary of content ==
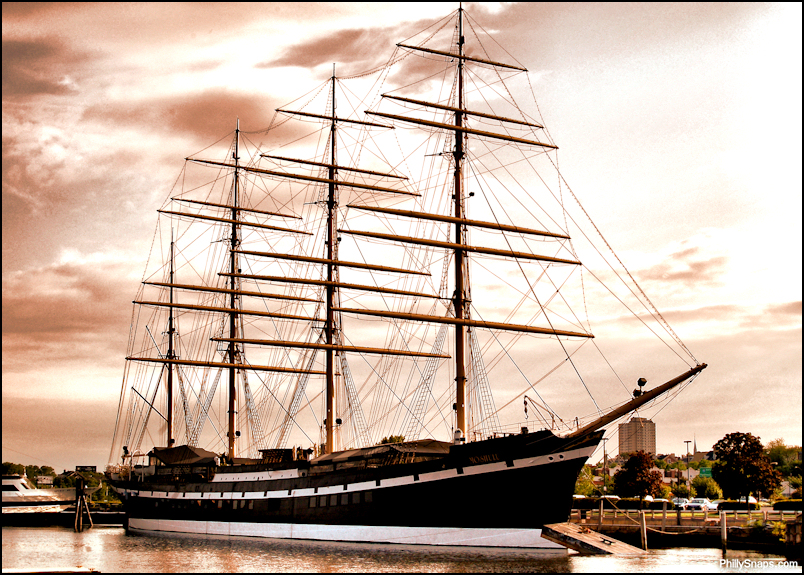
The four-masted barque Moshulu, the ship on which Eric Newby sailed. She is today a restaurant ship at Philadelphia, Pennsylvania, United States.

Newby finds out that his advertising agency, the Wurzel Agency, has lost a lucrative cereal account and he decides to write to Gustav Erikson of Mariehamn for a place on one of his grain ships, having been inspired with tales of the sea by an old family friend, Mr Mountstewart. Much to his surprise, he is accepted by 'Ploddy Gustav', the owner of the largest fleet of square-rigged deep-water sailing vessels in the world at that time.

After fitting himself out with heavy-weather gear, Newby makes his way to Belfast where Moshulu is discharging her cargo in York Dock. He meets some of the crew and they take him out on a drinking binge, but not before the second mate has ordered him "op the rigging". As the ship waits in port, he spends his time chipping away at the rust on the ship's hull but also befriends John Sömmarström, the ship's sailmaker, 58 years old, 43 of which have been at sea, who explains all the technicalities of a square rig to the young greenhorn.

The ship has a rough passage through the Irish Sea and ten days out they are passing Gibraltar. The ship's forecastle where the crew sleeps is overrun by bugs, including their beds, so they string hammocks (with practical jokers cutting the ropes they hang from). 24 days out, the ship picks up the Trade Wind and Moshulu is hit by a tornado. By now the crew is getting desperate for any food different from their staple menu and Newby shares his last can of peaches with another crewman, Kroner.

On the 34th day, Moshulu crosses the Equator and, along with a bottle of Akvavit from the captain, the new crewmen undergo the initiation ceremony – their heads are covered in tar and red lead. It is at this stage that Newby almost kills himself by not attaching his bosun's chair correctly. He also must undertake horrific jobs like cleaning the heads (the lavatories) and doing backstern—washing up for the 20 occupants of the three forecastles. Tension rises as weather conditions worsen, and Newby finally fights Hermansonn, whom Newby is able to smash after ten minutes.

Moshulu finally reaches port and the ship is loaded with 60,000 sacks (about 5000 tons) of grain—"wheat" in America, "corn" elsewhere—at Port Lincoln in South Australia. All the crew go on a bender, having at last received their measly pay. The ship sails on to Port Victoria and the crew have to offload the ballast on the outer-ballast grounds, working amidst the stench of two dead dog carcasses that the Belfast stevedores had kindly included. The ship finally leaves Australia on 11 March 1939 and Newby's new job, given to him by the First Mate who dislikes him, is to muck out the pigsties of four large pigs—"dose brodders of yours". Moshulu is prepared to meet the Southern Ocean and Newby at last experiences some real storms as the sea washes over the deck and the crew have to deal with flapping sails perched high up in the rigging. Newby manages to fall off the yard backwards, knocked off by 40 feet (12 m) of canvas, but fortunately becomes entangled in the weather rigging 5 feet (1.5 m) below the yard.

The storm finally abates but not before it enters its most impressive phase.

We were cold and wet, and yet too excited to sleep ... watching the seas rearing up astern as high as a three-storeyed house. It was not only their height that was impressive but their length. Between the greatest of them there was a distance that could only be estimated in relation to the ship, as much as four times her entire length, or nearly a quarter of a mile.

Newby goes aloft into the fore rigging:

At this height, 130 feet up, in a wind blowing 70 miles an hour, the noise was an unearthly scream. Above me was the naked topgallant yard and above that again the royal to which I presently climbed ... the high whistle of the wind through the halliards sheaf, and above all the pale blue illimitable sky, cold and serene, made me deeply afraid and conscious of my insignificance.

As they round Cape Horn, the crew have become bored by the desolation around them and engage in a tug-of-war competition from which Newby emerges victorious. They also kill a pig to celebrate Good Friday and they also spot another four-master—the Passat—whom they pass which makes Captain Sjögren happy. Having passed Cape Horn and the Falkland Islands, the crew start to realize they are making a record-breaking passage. The crew are now becoming famished, having to eat 'Buffelo' (boiled salt beef) the whole time cooked by the 'Kock'. However, life becomes easier with the return of the Trades but then Moshulu becomes becalmed. They finally cross the Line and are given a huge rum ration which they find difficult to get through, and spirits are lifted when they think they have caught a shark but it bends the hook. The last pig, Filamon, is slaughtered and the crew eat so much pork that it wreaks havoc with their stomachs.

Hopes of beating Parma's record of 83 days to Falmouth vanish as they believe the calms north of the line may have been too much for Moshulu. As she approaches Fastnet, the ship is approached by five men in a rowing boat to whom they give presents and they also receive some lobsters from a smack. On June 10, 1939, Moshulu reaches Queenstown, 91 days from Port Victoria and, as Padua takes 93 days to reach Falmouth, they have won the Last Grain Race. On 27 June, the ship is warped with difficulty into Queen's Dock, Glasgow. Captain Sjögren, with whom Newby has had a stiffly formal relationship, asks him if he is coming again as he inks in his discharge as Ordinary Seaman, but Newby leaves through the dock gates and never sees Moshulu again.

== The Erikson Line ==
Today steel, square-rigged sailing ships no longer trade the oceans of the world. Gustav Erikson of Mariehamn, Finland was the last man to own a great fleet of sailing ships and Newby relates that he never met any foremast hand who liked 'Ploddy Gustav'. Originally, as a boy of nine, he had gone to sea in a sailing vessel engaged in the North Sea timber trade. At the age of nineteen he got his first command in the North Sea, and after that spent six years in deep-water sail as a mate. From 1902 to 1913 he was master of a number of square-rigged vessels before becoming an owner.

By the 1930s, the grain trade from South Australia to Europe was the last enterprise in which square-riggers could engage with any real hope of profit, and then only if the owner had a keen interest in reducing running costs. As Newby notes, Erikson had to pay his crews as little as possible and he could not afford to insure ships, but he also had to maintain them at such a standard that they were rated 100 A1 at Lloyd's. From Newby's own description he was a formidable character:

He was respected and feared as a man over whose eyes no wool could be pulled by the masters whom he employed to sail his ships, and the tremors they felt were passed down to the newest joined apprentice. Of such stuff discipline is made. A now out-moded word, but sailing ships do not stay afloat and make fast passages at the pleasure of a committee of seamen.

On board, Moshulu was captained by Captain Mikael Sjögren, with a crew of twenty-eight, including officers, cook, steward etc. The work of handling large acreages of sail was very heavy, even for men and boys with strong constitutions. Bending a complete set of fair-weather canvas was no easy job, and sail changing was always done four times on a voyage as a ship entered and left the Trade Winds. In one period of twenty-four hours when the Pampero (a wind off the east coast of South America) was blowing, the port and starboard watches, eight men to a watch, took in, re-set, took and re-set again twenty-eight sails, the heaviest of which weighed 1^{1}/_{2} tons—a total of 112 operations.

== Sources ==
- The Last Grain Race, Picador (1990) ISBN 978-0-330-31885-3
