= Hugh Carless =

British diplomat, philanthropist and explorer (1925–2011)

- Born: 22 April 1925; Nainital, United Provinces, British India
- Died: 20 December 2011 (aged 86); London, England
- Occupation: Diplomat

Hugh Michael Carless CMG (22 April 1925 – 20 December 2011) was a British diplomat, philanthropist and explorer who served in Her Majesty's Diplomatic Service from 1950 to 1985. He is best known for the exploration of Nuristan and the Panjshir Valley along with his friend Eric Newby, which was the subject of Newby's humorous travel book A Short Walk in the Hindu Kush (1958).

== Biography ==
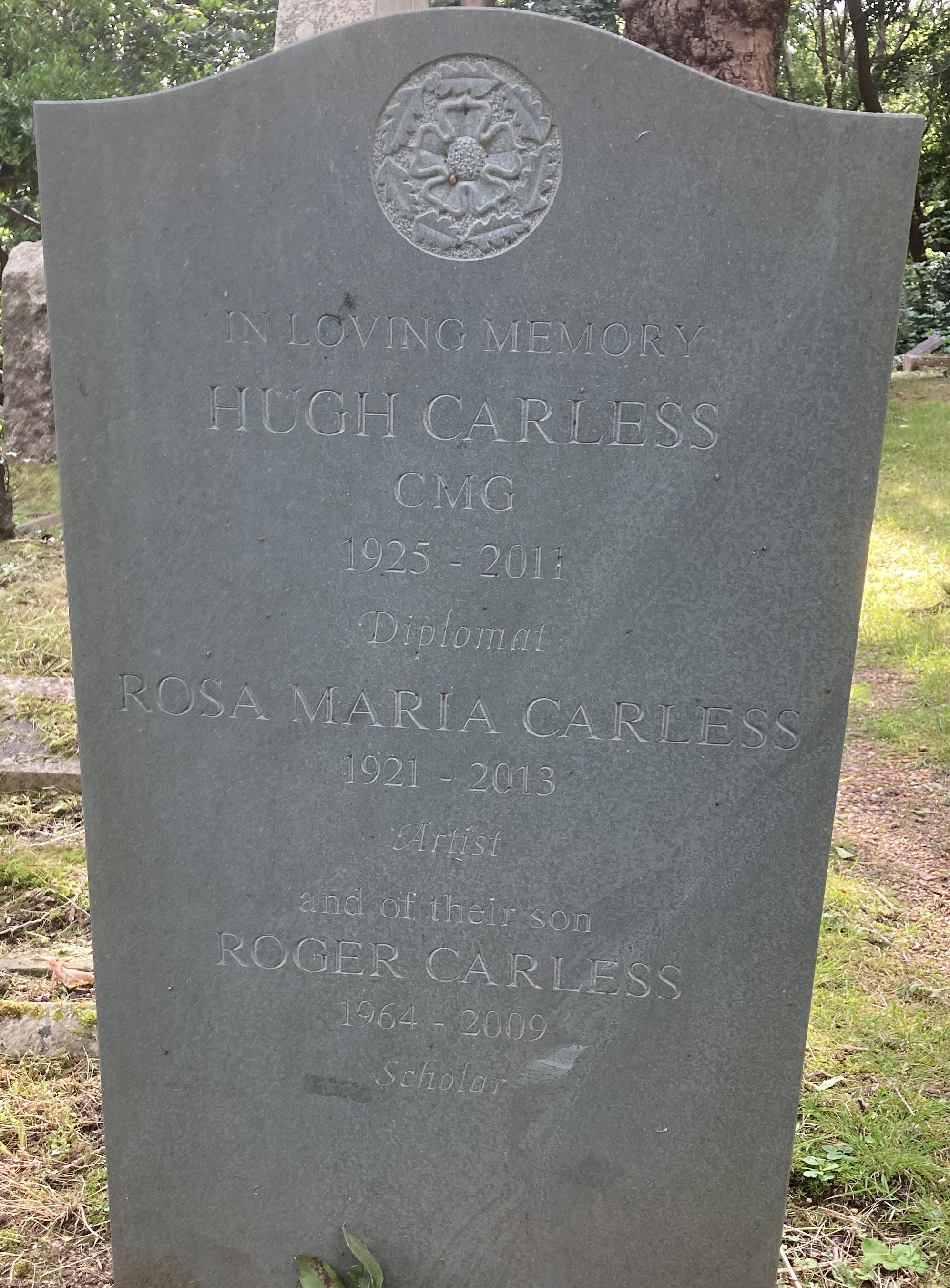
Family grave of Hugh Carless

Carless was born on 22 April 1925 in Nainital, British India, to Henry Alfred Carless, CIE, who served as a police officer in the Indian Civil Service (Inspector-General of Police, Ajmer-Merwara and advisor to the Resident of Rajputana) and his wife, Gwendolen Pattullo.

He was educated at Sherborne School, Dorset, the School of Oriental and African Studies (SOAS) where he spent a year (1942) studying Persian (Farsi), and Trinity Hall, Cambridge where he read history from 1947 until 1950.

Carless was commissioned in January 1944 in the Intelligence Corps and posted to Teheran as a staff officer with the 12th Indian Division, but volunteered for active service, first with the 5th Infantry Division, and later, in the last nine months of World War II he served in the 15th Scottish with the 6th Battalion of the Royal Scots Fusiliers.

Carless entered His Majesty's Diplomatic Service in 1950 and served as Third Secretary in Kabul from 1951 to 1953 and Second Secretary in Rio de Janeiro from 1953 to 1956. From 1956 to 1958 Carless was posted to Tehran as First (Oriental) Secretary. Between 1958 and 1961 he worked in the Information Research Dept, FO, and as Private Secretary to Lord Dundee, the Minister of State for Foreign Affairs (1961 to 1963). From 1963 to 1966 Carless served as Head of Chancery at the British Embassy in Budapest. Subsequent postings were as Consul-General to Angola from 1967 to 1970, and as Press and Information Counsellor to Bonn from 1970 to 1973. He headed the Latin America department of the Foreign Office from 1973 to 1977, before his ministerial appointment as chargé d'affaires in Buenos Aires, Argentina, from 1977 until 1980, where he monitored the disputed sovereignty of islands in the Beagle Channel, and the Falklands. This was followed by a two-year secondment to Northern Engineering Industries International Limited. From 1982 to 1985 Carless served as Ambassador to Venezuela until his retirement. He retired from the Diplomatic Service in 1985 on superannuation.

Following his retirement in 1985, Carless served as vice-chairman of the South Atlantic Council based in London, and between 1994 and 1996 he chaired the influential series of Argentine-British Conferences which helped to re-instate full diplomatic relations between the two countries after the Falklands war. He was the executive vice-president of the philanthropic Hinduja Foundation, which awarded scholarships to students from India.

During his service as First Secretary in Tehran in 1956, Carless received a telegraph from the British explorer and travel writer, Eric Newby, requesting him to accompany Newby on an expedition to the province of Nuristan in northern Afghanistan, to which Carless replied in the affirmative. This expedition was the subject of Newby's much loved travel book A Short Walk in the Hindu Kush (1958).

Carless married Brazilian Rosa Maria Frontini in 1956. The couple had two sons.

He is buried on the eastern side of Highgate Cemetery with his wife and one of his sons.

== Honours ==
Carless was made a Companion of the Order of St Michael and St George in 1976.

Diplomatic posts
Preceded by Reginald Secondé	British Ambassador to Venezuela; 1982–1985	Succeeded by Michael Newington
