= Love and War in the Apennines =

1971 memoir by Eric Newby

- First edition
- Author: Eric Newby
- Language: English
- Genre: Autobiographical novel
- Publisher: Hodder & Stoughton
- Publication date: 1971
- Publication place: United Kingdom
- Media type: Print (Hardback & Paperback)
- Pages: 224 pp
- ISBN: 978-0-330-28024-2
- OCLC: 36408373

Love and War in the Apennines is a 1971 Second World War memoir (with some changes of names and people and places, and some composite characters) by Eric Newby. In the United States the title was changed to When the Snow Comes, They Will Take You Away. It was dramatised as the 2001 film In Love and War starring Callum Blue and Barbora Bobuľová.

== Overview ==
After the Armistice between Italy and Allied armed forces in 1943, Eric Newby left the prisoner-of-war camp in which he had been held for a year. He evaded the Germans by going to ground high in the mountains and forests south of the Po River. In enforced isolation, he was sheltered and protected by a bold network of Italian peasants. Newby writes an account of these idiosyncratic and selfless people and also of their very straightforward lifestyle. He undergoes a series of unusual, comedic, and often dangerous incidents. In the process he meets Wanda, a local Slovene girl who later becomes his wife.

== Summary ==
Newby takes part in a Special Boat Service operation on the east coast of Sicily. He and his colleagues fail to make their rendezvous with a British submarine and are picked up by a fishing boat.

Newby is imprisoned in an orphanage at Fontanellato in the Po valley. With the Armistizio, the Italians let the English prisoners escape. Because Newby has a broken ankle he is abandoned and is hidden in a farmer's hay loft until an Italian doctor takes him to the hospital. Here he is visited by Wanda, the daughter of a Slovene teacher, who gives him Italian lessons in exchange for English lessons and they fall in love. The Germans discover he is there but Newby escapes and hides, moving from one house to another.

Newby is nearly captured and moves into the mountains to stay with a shepherd; villagers build him a camouflaged cave. Further exciting adventures follow, and a meeting with Wanda.

== Reception ==
The New York Times wrote of Love and War that "His memoir of that time became one of his most acclaimed books".

The novelist Simon Mawer, writing on the NPR website, describes the book as follows:

Read the book and you are there in the Italian mountains with him: You can feel the stony soil, smell the wood smoke in the air, sense the snow on the wind. He conjures up the stubborn, fatalistic, bloody-minded locals who risked their lives for him so vividly that they seem to be standing in front of you. You share his fears and his hopes. He makes you laugh and he makes you weep. It's quite an achievement for an author commonly labeled as a travel writer. — Simon Mawer

Travel writer John Gimlette, writing in The Guardian, comments that "For sheer charm, there's nothing quite like Eric Newby's Love and War in the Apennines." He adds that while it is plainly a celebration of Italy, "At a more profound level, it's a beautifully philanthropic yet unsentimental work. However miserable the times and awkward the place, Newby's characters are usually endearing, and often complex."

== Sources ==
- Love and War in the Apennines, Picador (1983) ISBN 978-0-330-28024-2

== Sources ==
- "Obituaries: Eric Newby". The Daily Telegraph. 23 October 2006.
- "Eric Newby: At the frontiers of the language". The Daily Telegraph. 22 May 1999.
- "Love and War in the Appennines by Eric Newby". italian-mysteries.com.
- "Book Reviews: Love and War in the Apennines by Eric Newby". ExperiencePlus.com. 1 April 2002. Archived from the original on 6 April 2007.
- Fox, Margalit (24 October 2006). "Eric Newby, 86, Acclaimed British Travel Writer, Dies". New York Times.
