= Eric Newby =

British writer

- Born: 6 December 1919; Hammersmith, London
- Died: 20 October 2006 (aged 86); Guildford, Surrey
- Occupations: Author, travel writer
- Spouse: Wanda (née Škof)
- Children: 2 (Sonia and Jonathan)
- Writing career
- Period: 1956–99
- Genres: History, travel, non-fiction,
- Subjects: India, Middle East, Britain, Europe, Afghanistan

George Eric Newby CBE MC (6 December 1919 – 20 October 2006) was an English travel writer. His works include A Short Walk in the Hindu Kush, The Last Grain Race and A Small Place in Italy.

== Early life ==
Newby was born in Barnes, London, and grew up near Hammersmith Bridge, London. His father, George, was a partner in a firm of wholesale dressmakers, and his mother, (Minnie) Hilda (née Pomeroy) had been a dress model at Harrods. Newby was educated at St Paul's School; after leaving school he worked for two years at the Dorland advertising agency until 1938 when, at the age of 18, he apprenticed aboard the Finnish windjammer Moshulu and took part in the "grain race" from Australia to Europe by way of Cape Horn. This voyage was subsequently described in The Last Grain Race and pictorially documented in Learning the Ropes.

== Military career ==
During the Second World War, Newby was commissioned in the Black Watch in 1940. As a junior officer in the Rajput Regiment of the British Indian Army, he studied for six months of 1941 in Fatehgarh, India, for the Lower Standard Urdu Examination that was required to command Indian troops abroad. After passing the examination he was posted to North Africa.

He served in the Black Watch and the Special Boat Section, and was captured during an operation against the coast of Sicily in August 1942. He was awarded the Military Cross in 1946 for his part in the raid.

Newby was sent to a prisoner-of-war camp, PG21, at Chieti, a few miles inland from Pescara on the Adriatic coast, and later to PG49 at Fontanellato, near Parma. Escaping with Michael Gilbert and other British prisoners after the Italian Armistice of 3 September 1943, he was helped to hide in the Apennine countryside by a Slovene anti-fascist woman, Vanda Škof (later Wanda Skof), who married him after the war and became a companion on his travels. These experiences were described in his memoir Love and War in the Apennines, which focuses on how he was helped by ordinary Italians. A film, In Love and War, was made in 2001 based on the book, starring Callum Blue as Newby and Barbora Bobuľová as Wanda. He was free until January 1944, when he was recaptured.

== Postwar career ==
After the war, he spent 17 years working on and off in the women's fashion business, described in the book Something Wholesale (1962). In 1956, he set out to climb Mir Samir in the Hindu Kush of Afghanistan with his friend Hugh Carless, an expedition later chronicled in A Short Walk in the Hindu Kush. The voyage included a chance meeting with the English explorer Wilfred Thesiger. From 1964 to 1973, Newby was Travel Editor for The Observer newspaper.

== Later life and recognition ==
In 1967, Newby and his wife began restoring a dilapidated farmhouse in the foothills of the Apuan Alps in Italy. A Small Place in Italy, a memoir of the couple's experiences in renovating the house, was published in 1995.

Newby was awarded a CBE in 1994 and the Lifetime Achievement Award of the British Guild of Travel Writers in 2001. His life and work were profiled in ITV's The South Bank Show, directed by Tony Knox, in 1994. In the same decade, he made travelogues for the BBC, returning to Parma with his wife Wanda in The Travel Show (1994) and visiting one of his favourite cities, Istanbul (1996), both films directed by Paul Coueslant.

Newby's last published book was A Book of Lands and Peoples, which appeared in 2003. He died aged 86 in Guildford, Surrey.

== Selected bibliography ==
- The Last Grain Race (1956)
  - French edition Tempêtes en mers du sud (1975)
- A Short Walk in the Hindu Kush (1958)
  - French edition Un petit tour dans l'Hindu (1989)
- Something Wholesale: My Life and Times in the Rag Trade (1962)
- Slowly Down the Ganges (1966)
  - French edition Au fil des fleuves (1972)
- Time off in Southern Italy: The Observer Guide to Resorts and Hotels (ed.) (1966)
- My Favorite Stories of Travel (ed.) (1967)
- Grain Race: Pictures of Life before the Mast in a Windjammer (1968)
- Wonders of Britain: A Personal Choice of 480 with Diana Petry (1968)
- Wonders of Ireland: A Personal Choice of 484 with Diana Petry (1969)
- Love and War in the Apennines (1971)
  - US edition When the Snow Comes, They Will Take You Away (1971)
- The Mitchell Beazley World Atlas of Exploration (1975)
- Great Ascents: A Narrative History of Mountaineering (1977)
- The Big Red Train Ride (1978)
- A Traveller's Life (1982)
- On the Shores of the Mediterranean (1984)
- A Book of Travellers' Tales (ed.) (1985)
- Round Ireland in Low Gear (1987)
- What the Traveller Saw (1989)
- A Small Place in Italy (1994)
- A Merry Dance Around the World: The Best of Eric Newby (1995)
- Learning the Ropes: An Apprentice in the Last of the Windjammers (1999)
- Departures and Arrivals (1999)
- A Book of Lands and Peoples (2003)

== Bibliography ==
- Cocker, Mark, Loneliness and Time: British Travel Writing in the Twentieth Century, London: Secker and Warburg, and New York: Pantheon, 1992
- Newby, Wanda, Peace and War: Growing up in Fascist Italy, London: Collins, 1991
- Robb, Kenneth A. and Harender Vasudeva, "Eric Newby" in British Travel Writers, 1940[-]1997, Dictionary of Literary Biography, volume 204, edited by Barbara Brothers and Julia M. Gergits, Detroit: Gale, 1999: 223–34
- Thesiger, Wilfred, Desert, Marsh and Mountain: The World of a Nomad, London: Collins, 1979; as The Last Nomad, New York: Dutton, 1980
