= Jewellery =

Items of personal adornment

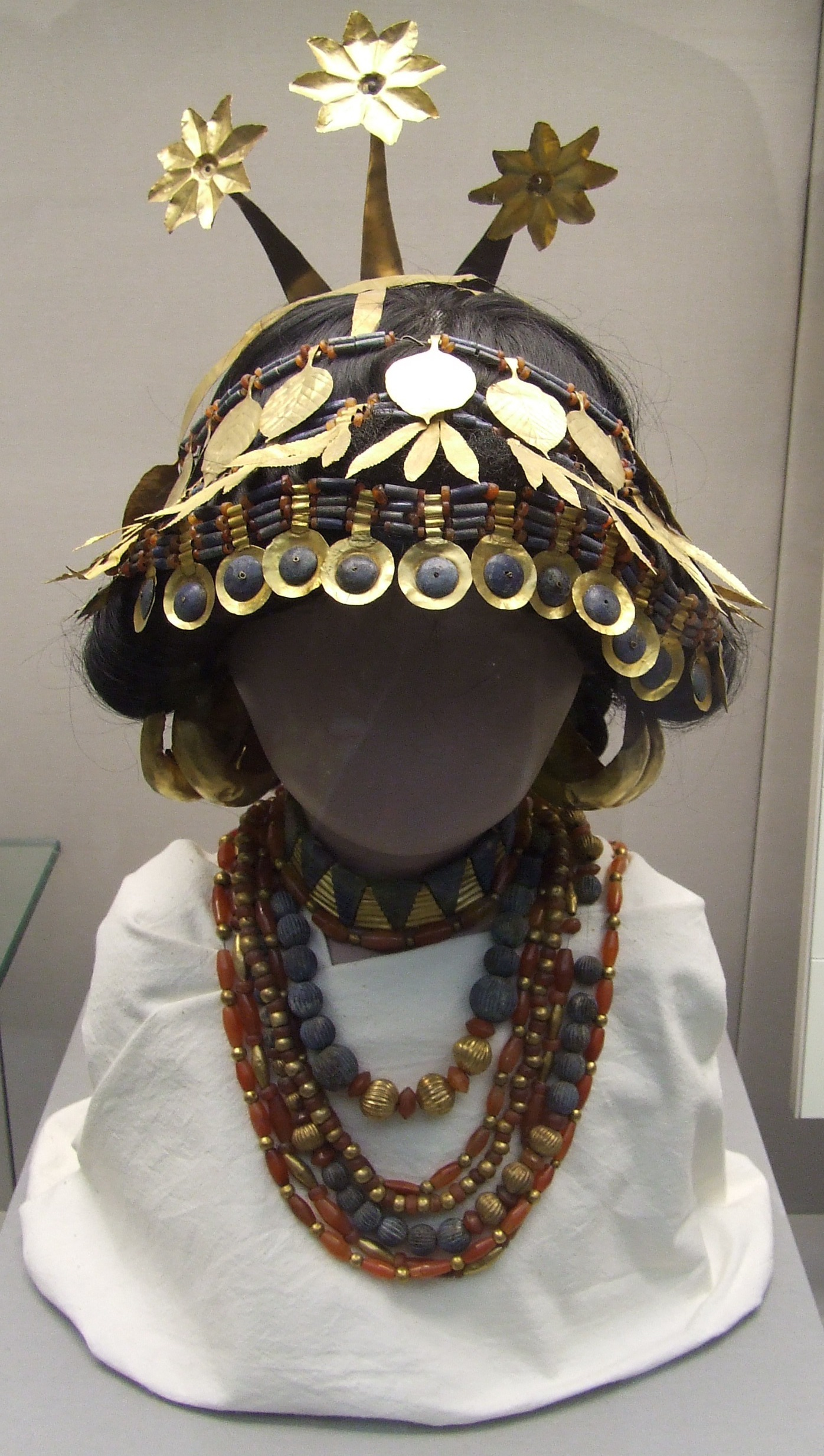
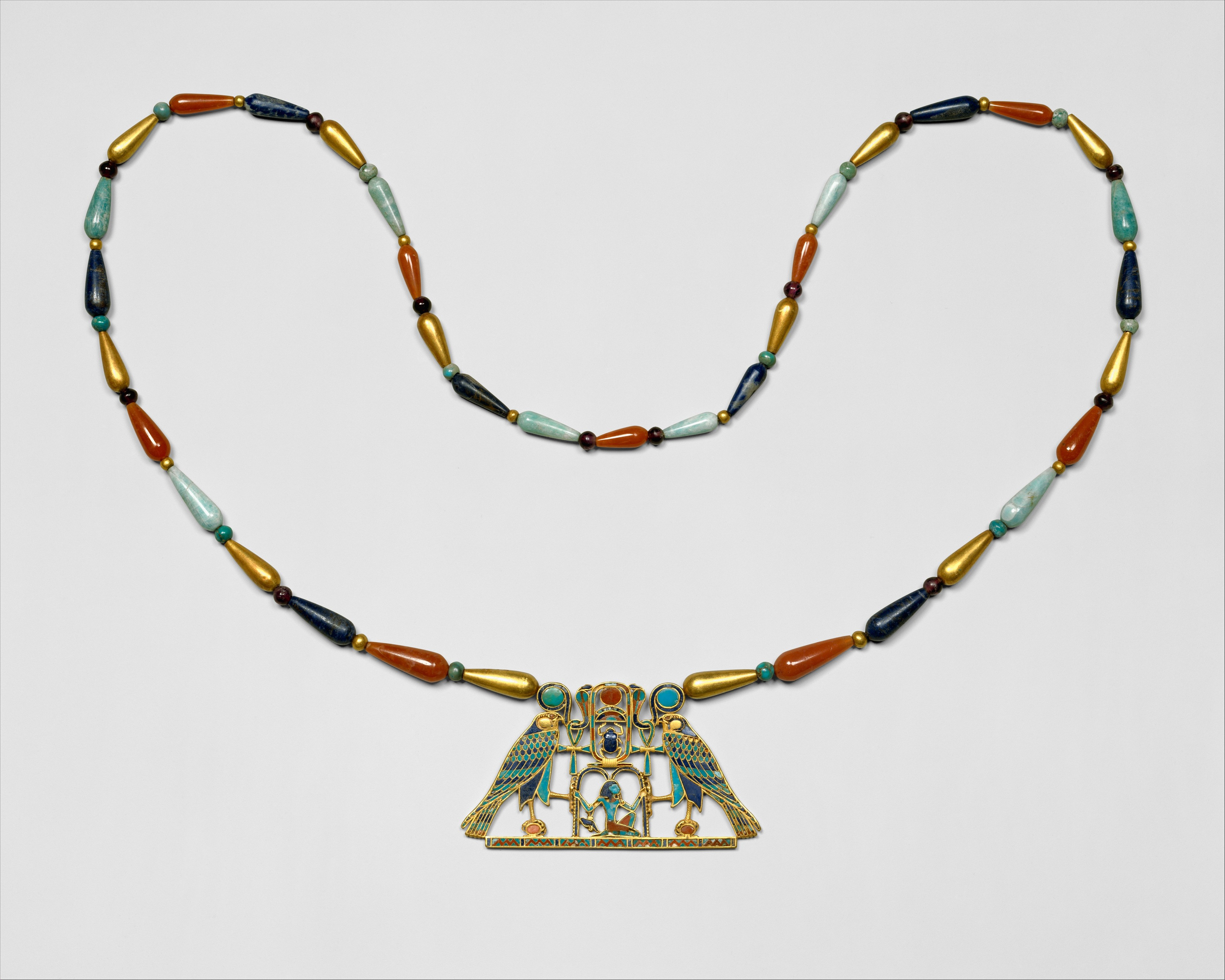
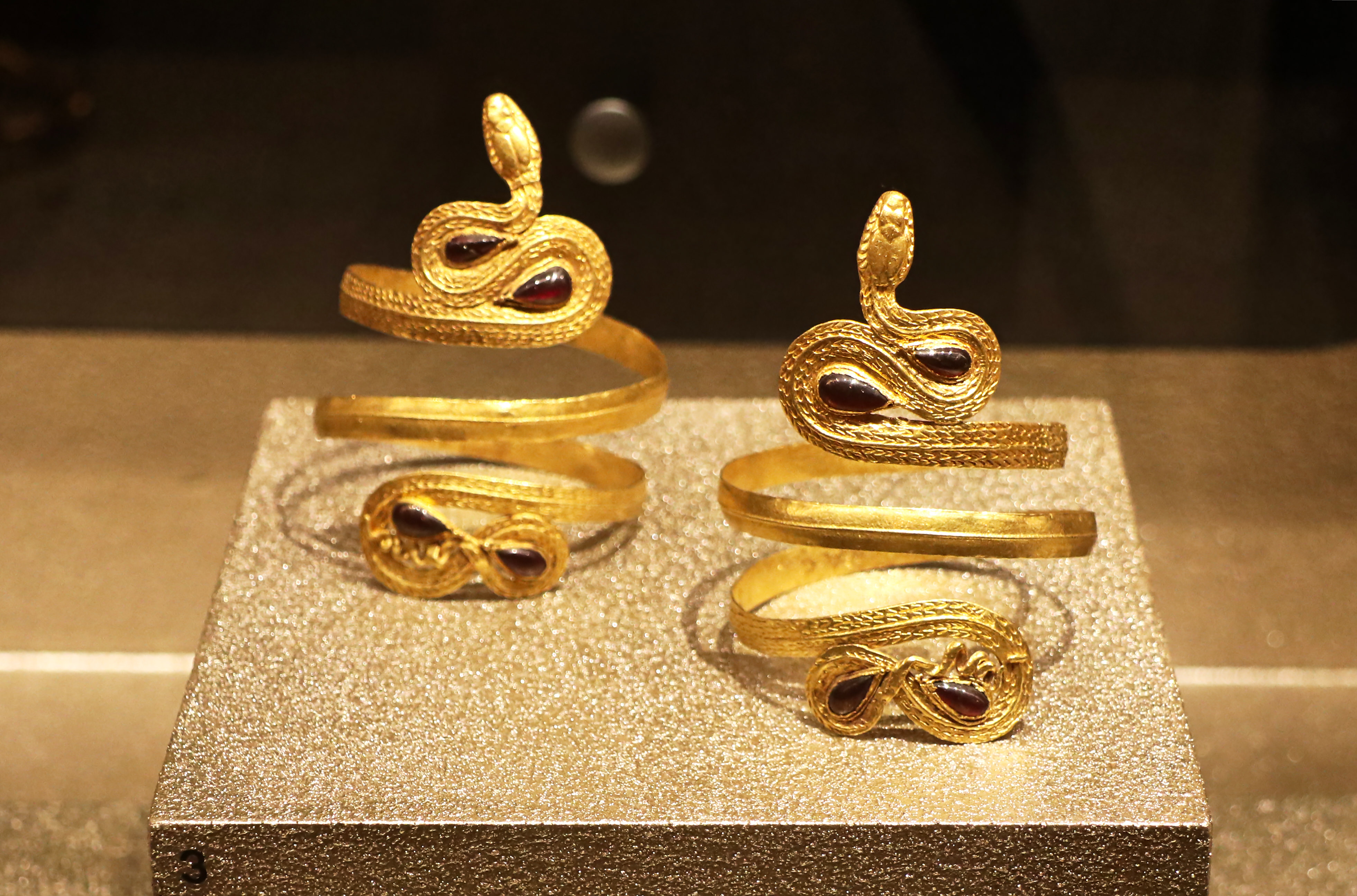
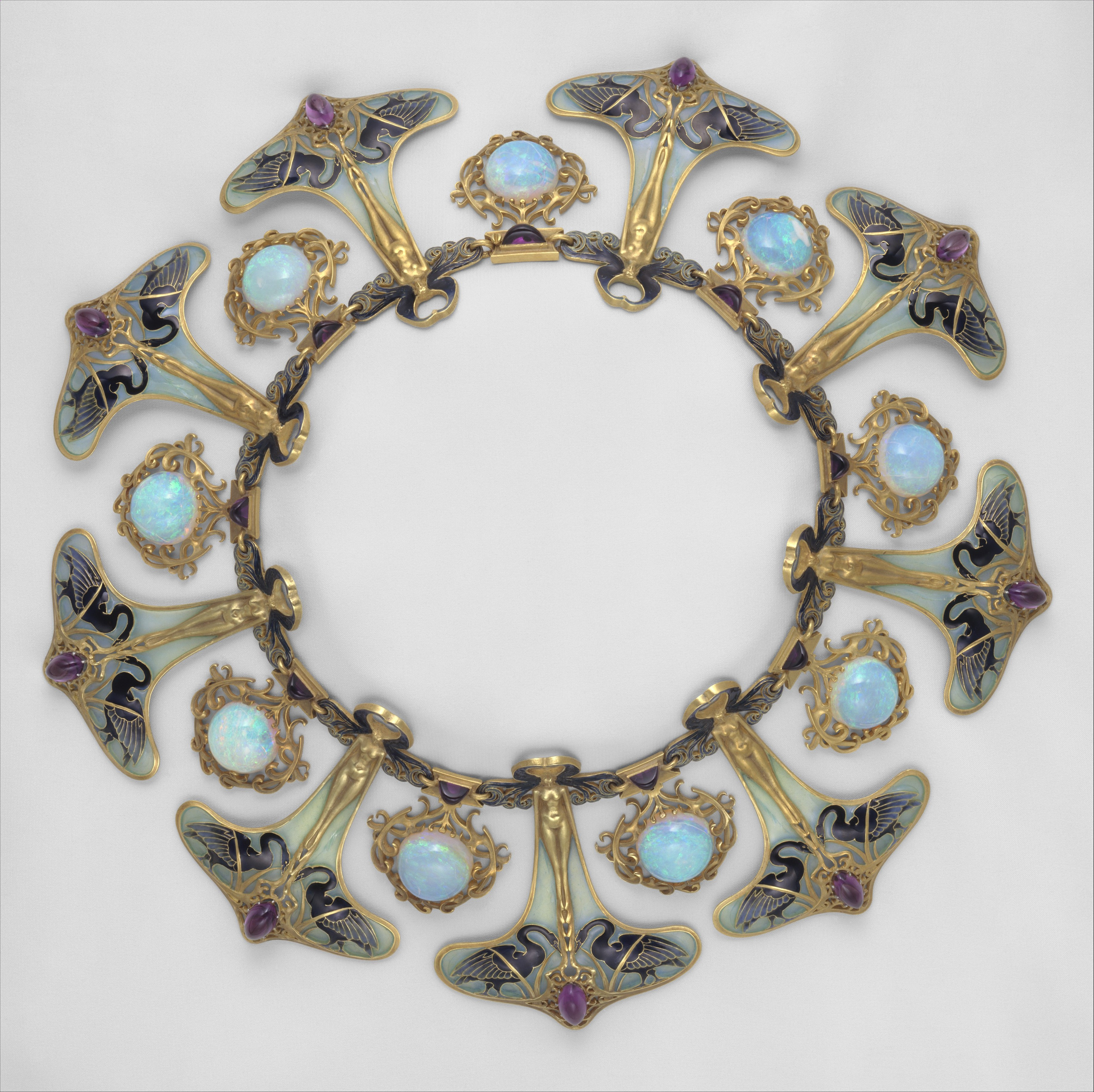
Various examples of jewellery throughout history

Jewellery (or jewelry in American English) consists of decorative items worn for personal adornment such as brooches, rings, necklaces, earrings, pendants, bracelets, and cufflinks. Jewellery may be attached to the body or the clothes. From a Western perspective, the term is restricted to durable ornaments, excluding flowers for example. For many centuries, metals such as gold and silver, often combined with gemstones, have been the standard material for jewellery. Other materials such as glass, shells, or wood may also be used.

Jewellery is among the oldest known forms of personal adornment. Perforated shell beads excavated at Bizmoune Cave in Morocco have been dated to at least 142,000 years ago.

Jewellery may be made from a wide range of materials. Gemstones and similar materials such as amber and coral, precious metals, beads, and shells have been widely used. The use of enamel is often important in jewelry making. In many cultures jewellery can be understood as a status symbol because of its material, its patterns, or for meaningful symbols. Jewellery has been made to adorn nearly every body part, from hairpins to toe rings, and even genital jewellery. In modern European culture the amount worn by adult males is relatively low compared with other cultures and other periods in European culture. Jewellery that is designed to be worn for long periods, is created without a clasp or opening, or is always worn is called permanent jewellery.

== Etymology ==
The word jewellery itself is derived from the word jewel, which was anglicised from the Old French "jouel", and beyond that, to the Latin word "jocale", meaning plaything. In British English, Indian English, New Zealand English, Hiberno-English, Australian English, and South African English it is spelled jewellery. At the same time, the spelling is jewelry in American English. Both are used in Canadian English. However, jewellery prevails by a two-to-one margin. In French and a few other European languages the equivalent term, joaillerie, may also cover decorated metalwork in precious metal such as objets d'art and church items, not just objects worn on the person.

== Form and function ==
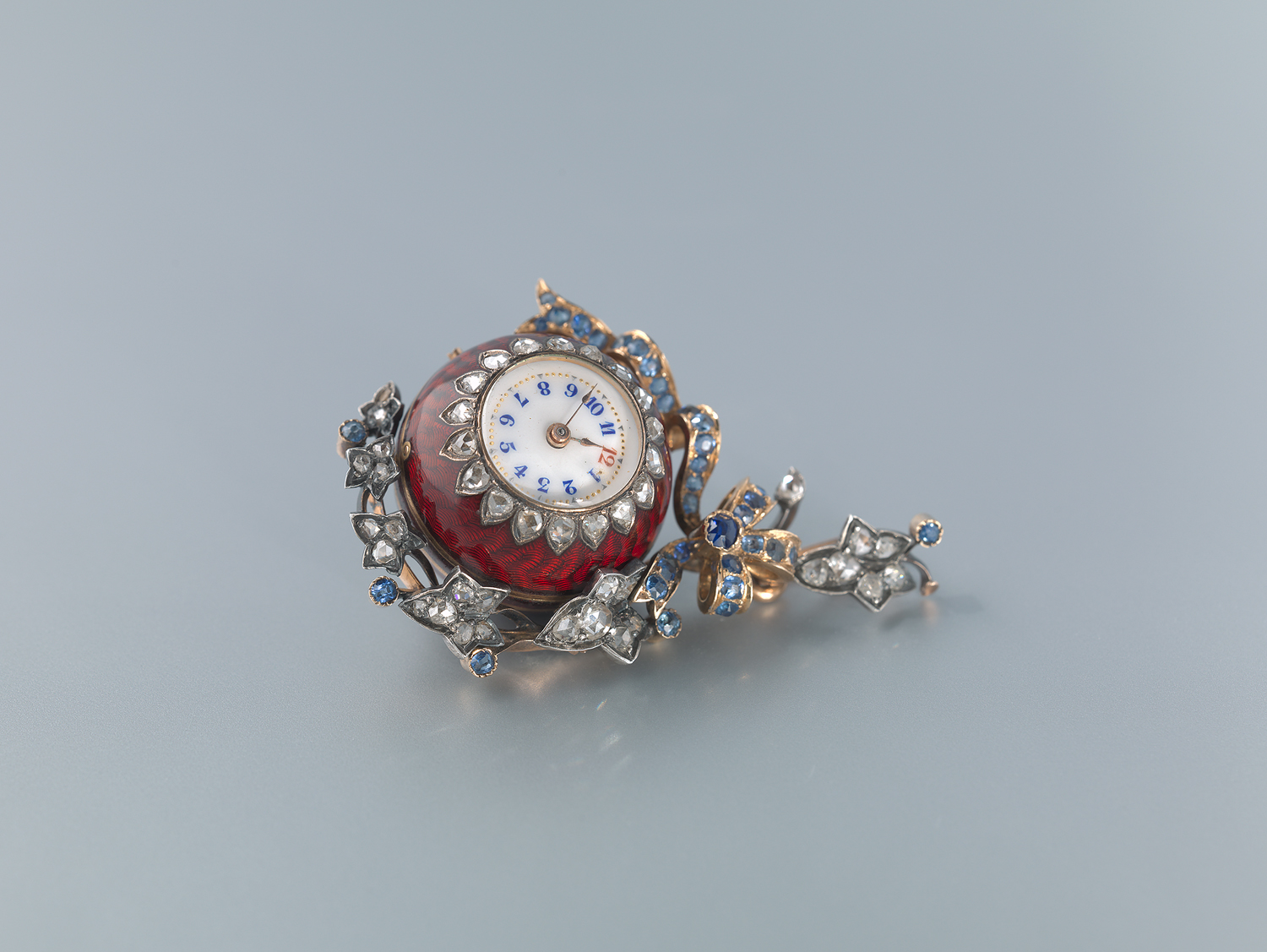
A gold, diamonds and sapphires red guilloché enamel "Boule de Genève", a type of pendant watch used as an accessory for women. An example of an object which is functional, artistic/decorative, marker of social status or a symbol of personal meaning.

Humans have used jewellery for a number of different reasons:

- functional, generally to fix clothing or hair in place.
- as a marker of social status and personal status, as with a wedding ring
- as a signifier of some form of affiliation, whether ethnic, religious or social
- to provide talismanic protection (in the form of amulets)
- as an artistic display
- as a carrier or symbol of personal meaning – such as love, mourning, a personal milestone or even luck
- Superstition

Numerous cultures store wedding dowries in the form of jewellery or make jewellery as a means to store or display coins. Alternatively, jewellery has been used as a currency or trade good to buy and sell, an example being the use of slave beads.

Many items of jewellery, such as brooches and buckles, originated as purely functional items, but evolved into decorative items as their functional requirement diminished. Similarly, Tiffany & Co. produced inkwells in the late 19th and early 20th centuries, skillfully combining materials like enamel and fine metals, reflecting the same craftsmanship seen in their jewellery collections. These inkwells were not only practical but also artistic in design.

Jewellery can symbolise group membership (as in the case, of the Christian crucifix or the Jewish Star of David) or status (as in the case of chains of office, or the Western practice of married people wearing wedding rings).

Wearing of amulets and devotional medals to provide protection or to ward off evil is common in some cultures. These may take the form of symbols (such as the ankh), stones, plants, animals, body parts (such as the Khamsa), or glyphs (such as stylised versions of the Throne Verse in Islamic art).

== Materials and methods ==
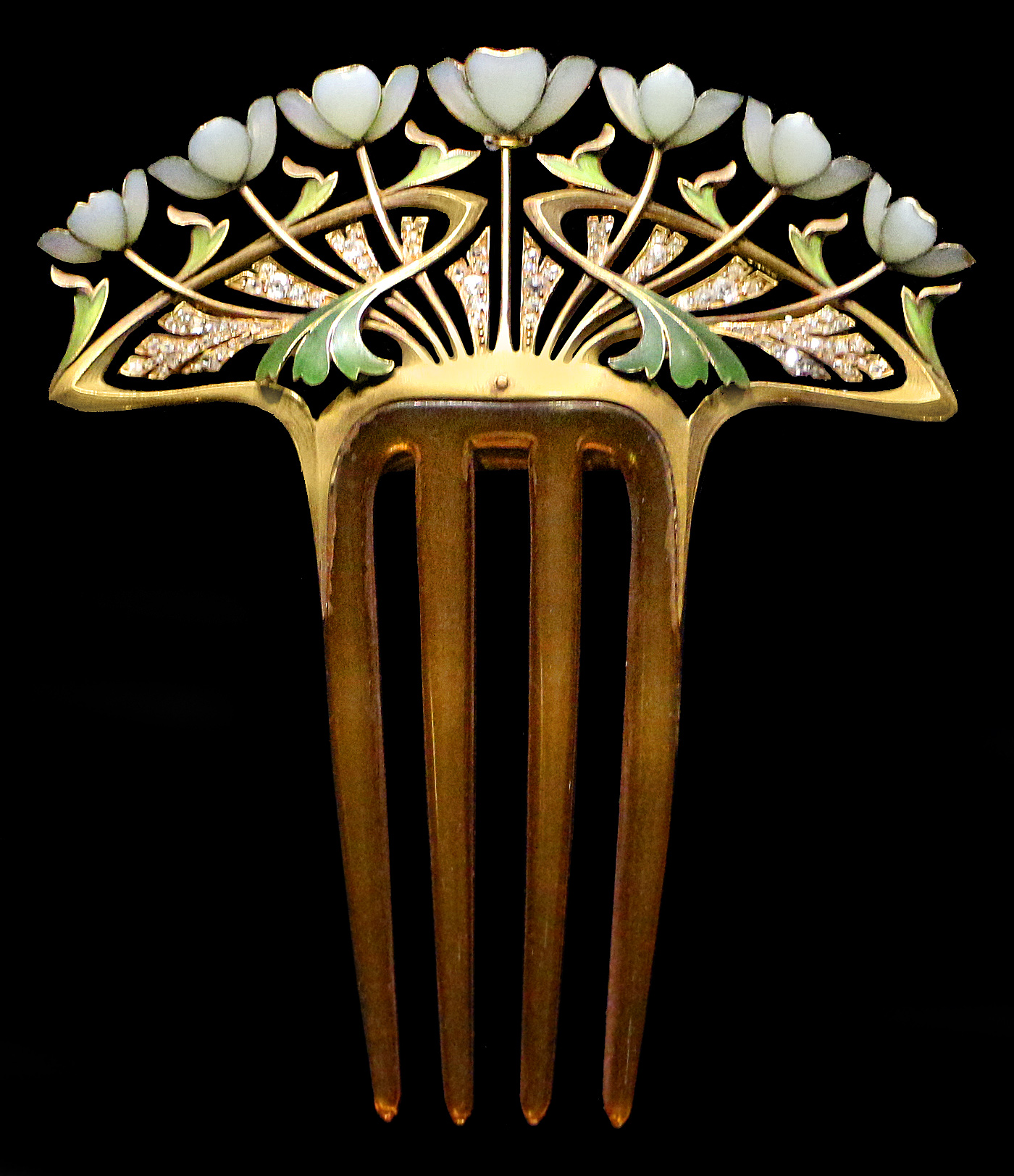
Hair ornament, an Art Nouveau masterpiece; by René Lalique; c. 1902; gold, emeralds and diamonds; Musée d'Orsay (Paris)

In creating jewellery, gemstones, coins, or other precious items are often used, and they are typically set into precious metals. Platinum alloys range from 900 (90% pure) to 950 (95% pure). The silver used in jewellery is usually sterling silver, or 92.5% fine silver. In costume jewellery, stainless steel findings are sometimes used.

Other commonly used materials include glass, such as fused-glass or enamel; wood, often carved or turned; shells and other natural animal substances such as bone and ivory; natural clay; polymer clay; Hemp and other twines have been used as well to create jewellery that has more of a natural feel. However, any inclusion of lead or lead solder will give a British Assay office (the body which gives U.K. jewellery its stamp of approval, the Hallmark) the right to destroy the piece, however, it is very rare for the assay office to do so.

Beads are frequently used in jewellery. These may be made of glass, gemstones, metal, wood, shells, clay and polymer clay. Beaded jewellery commonly encompasses necklaces, bracelets, earrings, belts and rings. Beads may be large or small; the smallest type of beads used are known as seed beads, these are the beads used for the "woven" style of beaded jewellery. Seed beads are also used in an embroidery technique where they are sewn onto fabric backings to create broad collar neck pieces and beaded bracelets. Bead embroidery, a popular type of handwork during the Victorian era, is enjoying a renaissance in modern jewellery making. Beading, or beadwork, is also very popular in many African and indigenous North American cultures.

Silversmiths, goldsmiths, and lapidaries use methods including forging, casting, soldering or welding, cutting, carving and "cold-joining" (using adhesives, staples and rivets to assemble parts).

=== Diamonds ===
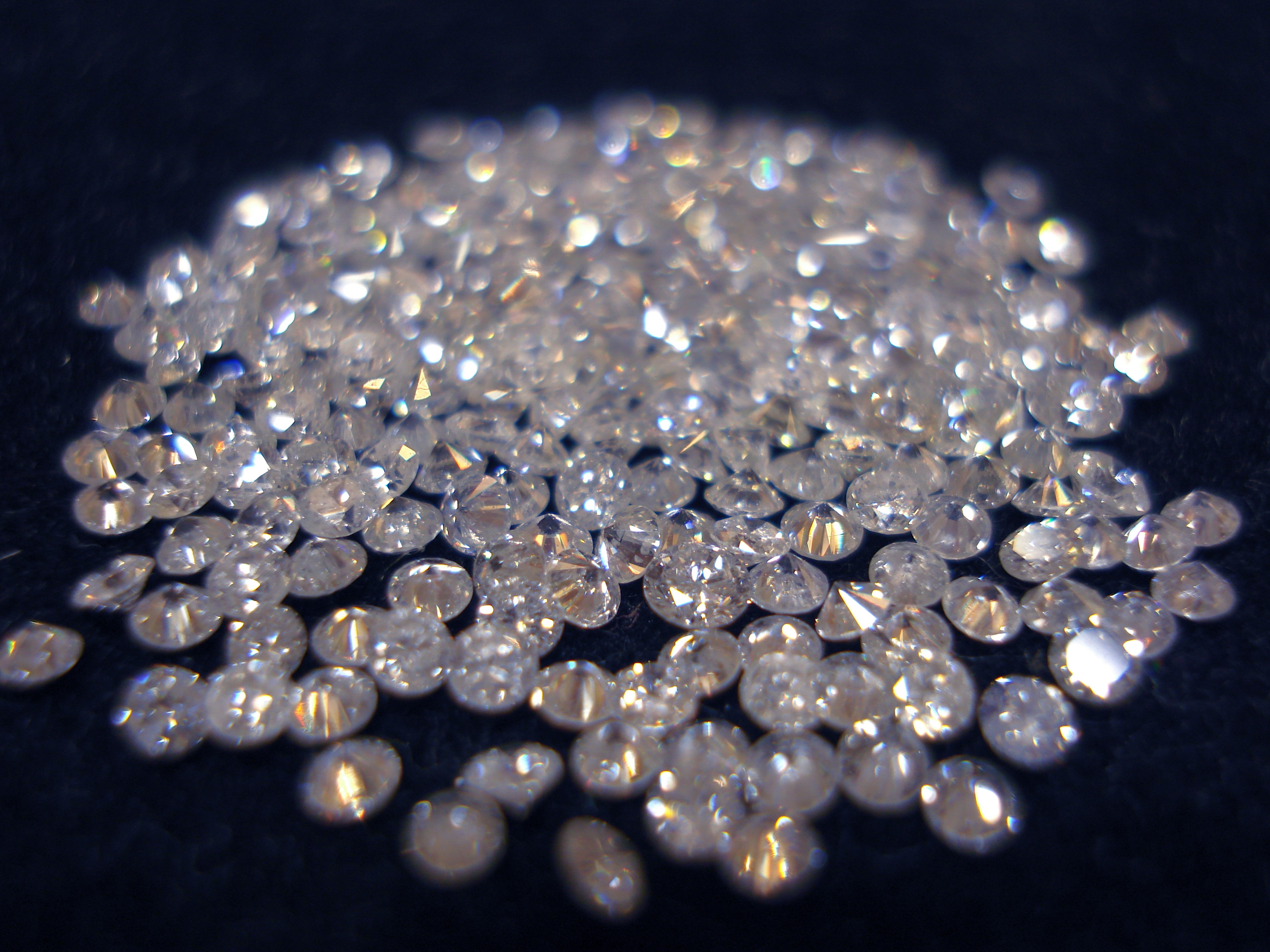
Diamonds

Diamonds were first mined in India. Pliny may have mentioned them, although there is some debate as to the exact nature of the stone he referred to as Adamas. In 2005, Australia, Botswana, Russia and Canada ranked among the primary sources of gemstone diamond production. According to figures published by the Kimberley Process, global natural rough-diamond production totalled approximately 98.8 million carats in 2025. There are negative consequences of the diamond trade in certain areas. Diamonds mined during the recent civil wars in Angola, Ivory Coast, Sierra Leone, and other nations have been labeled as blood diamonds when they are mined in a war zone and sold to finance an insurgency.

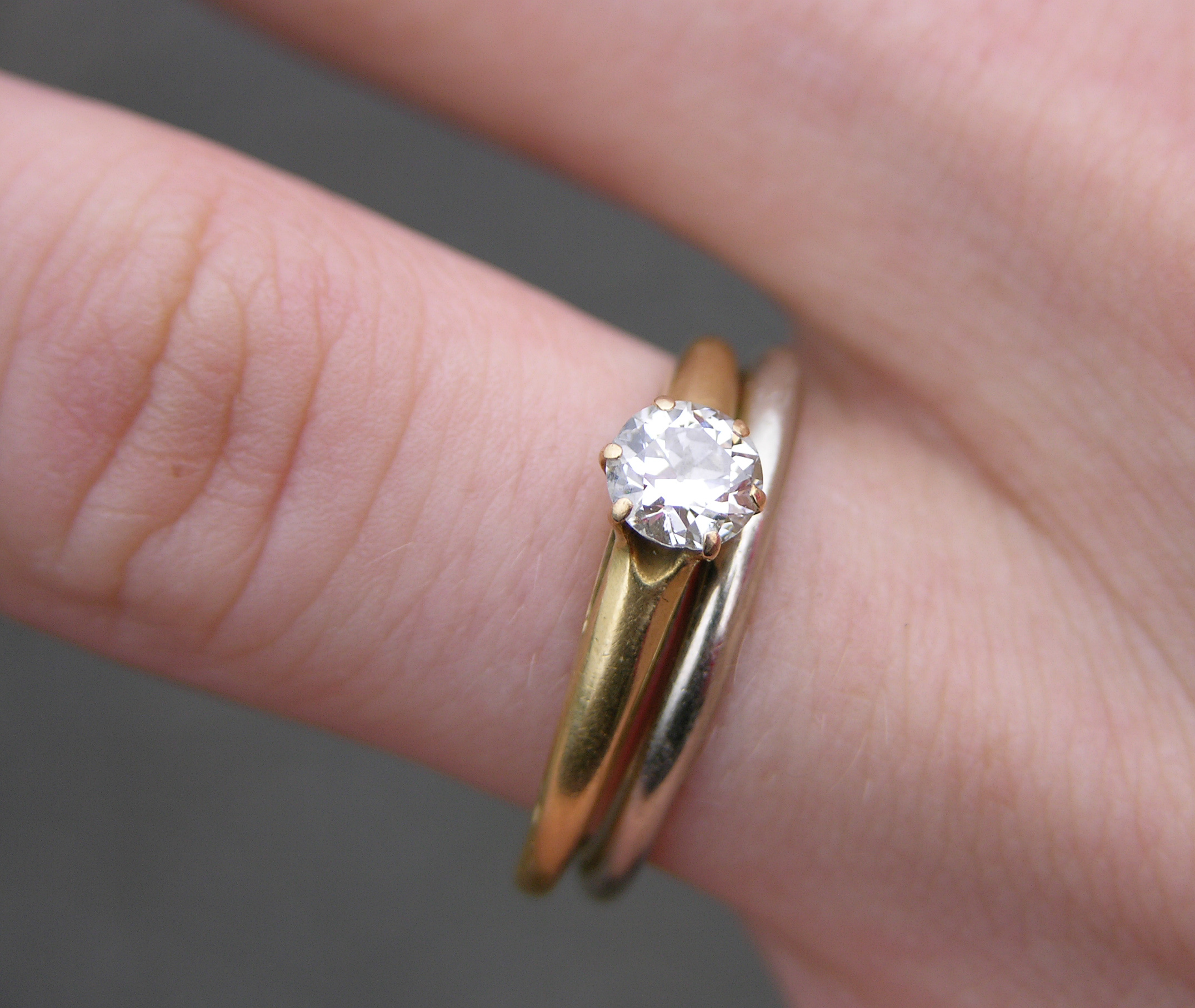
A diamond solitaire engagement ring

Now popular in engagement rings, the use of diamonds in jewellery dates back to the marriage of Maximilian I to Mary of Burgundy in 1477. A popular style is the diamond solitaire, which features a single large diamond mounted prominently.

The British crown jewels contain the Cullinan Diamond, part of the largest gem-quality rough diamond ever found (1905), at 3,106.75 carats (621.35 g).

=== Other gemstones ===
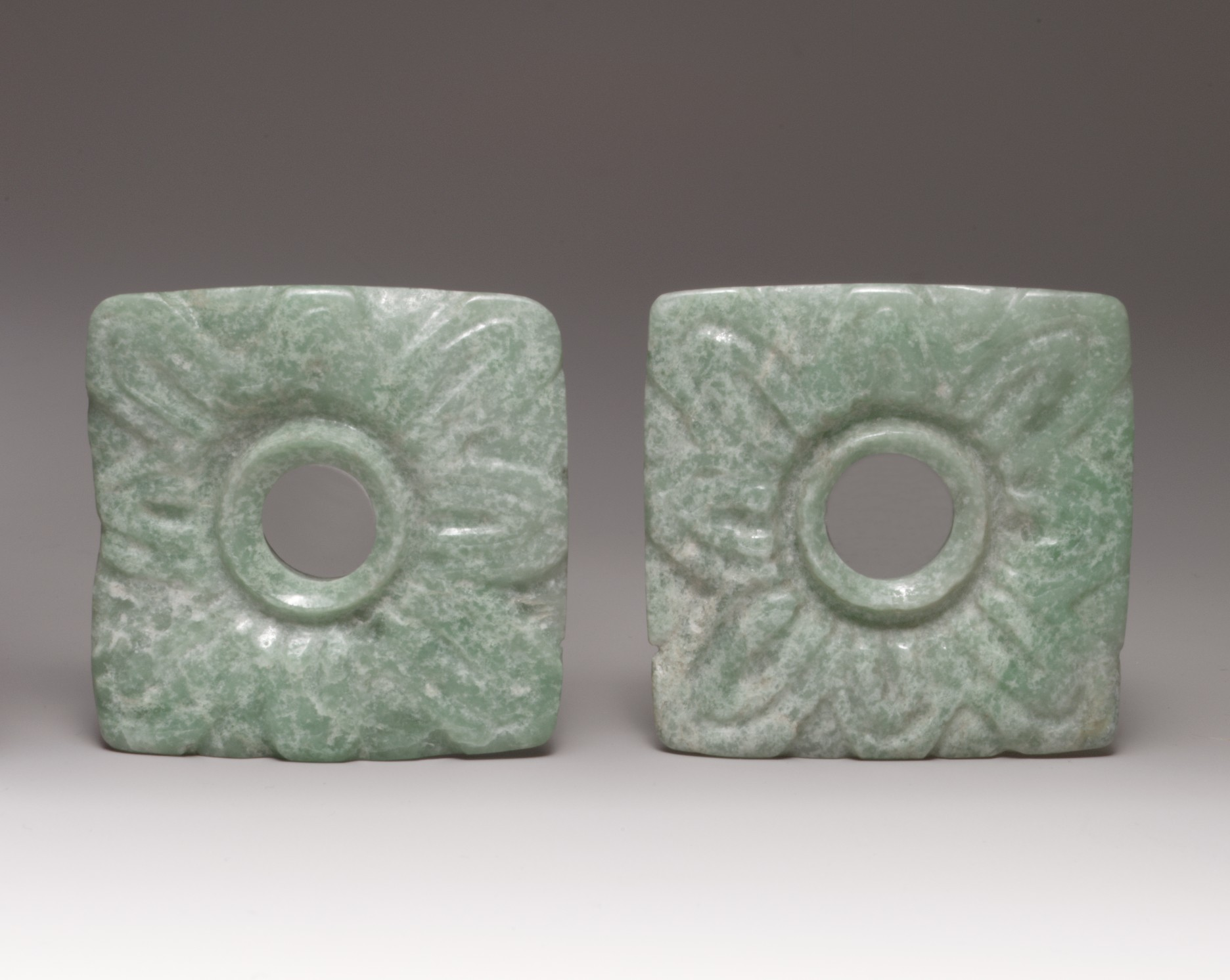
Jade

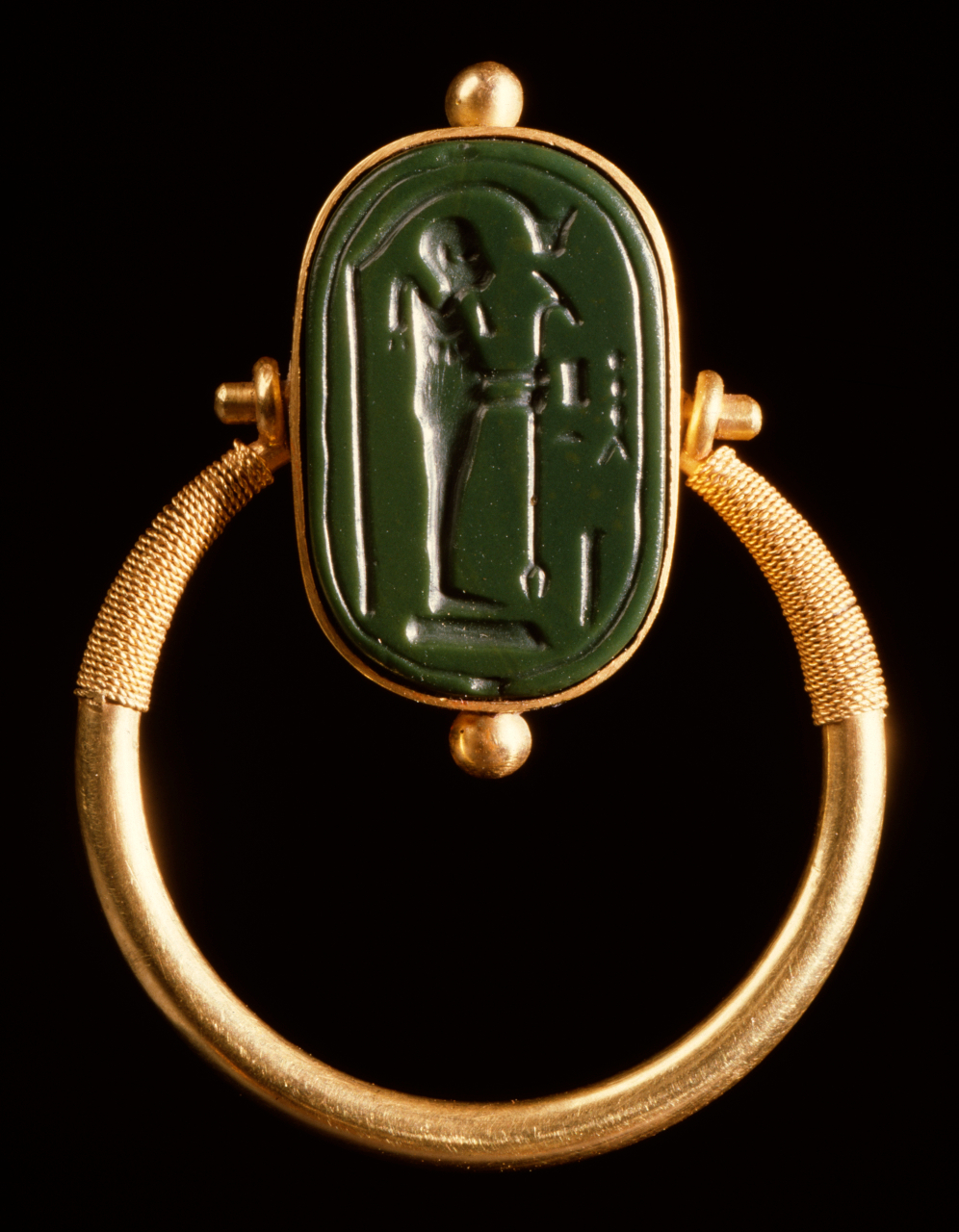
Jasper

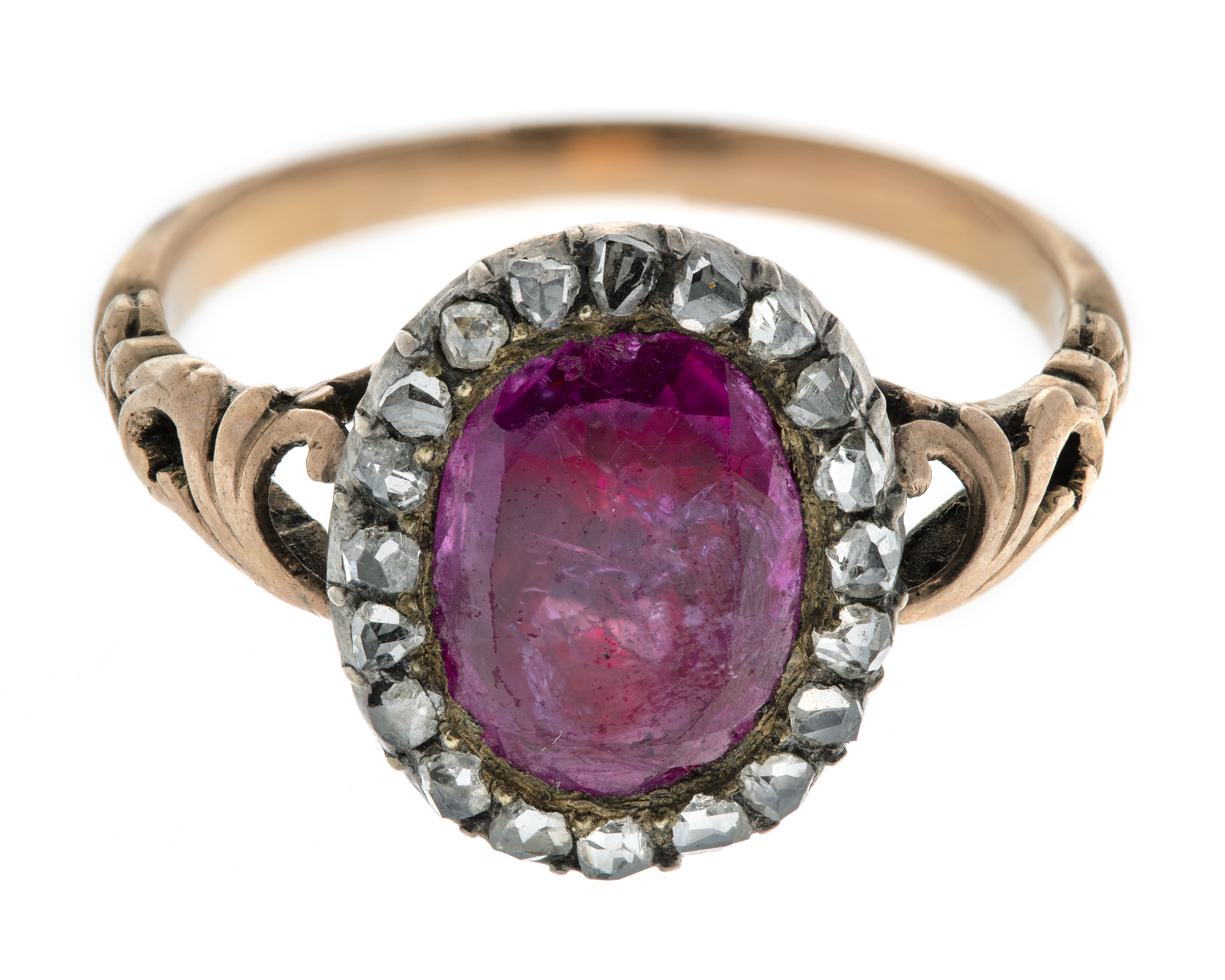
Ruby

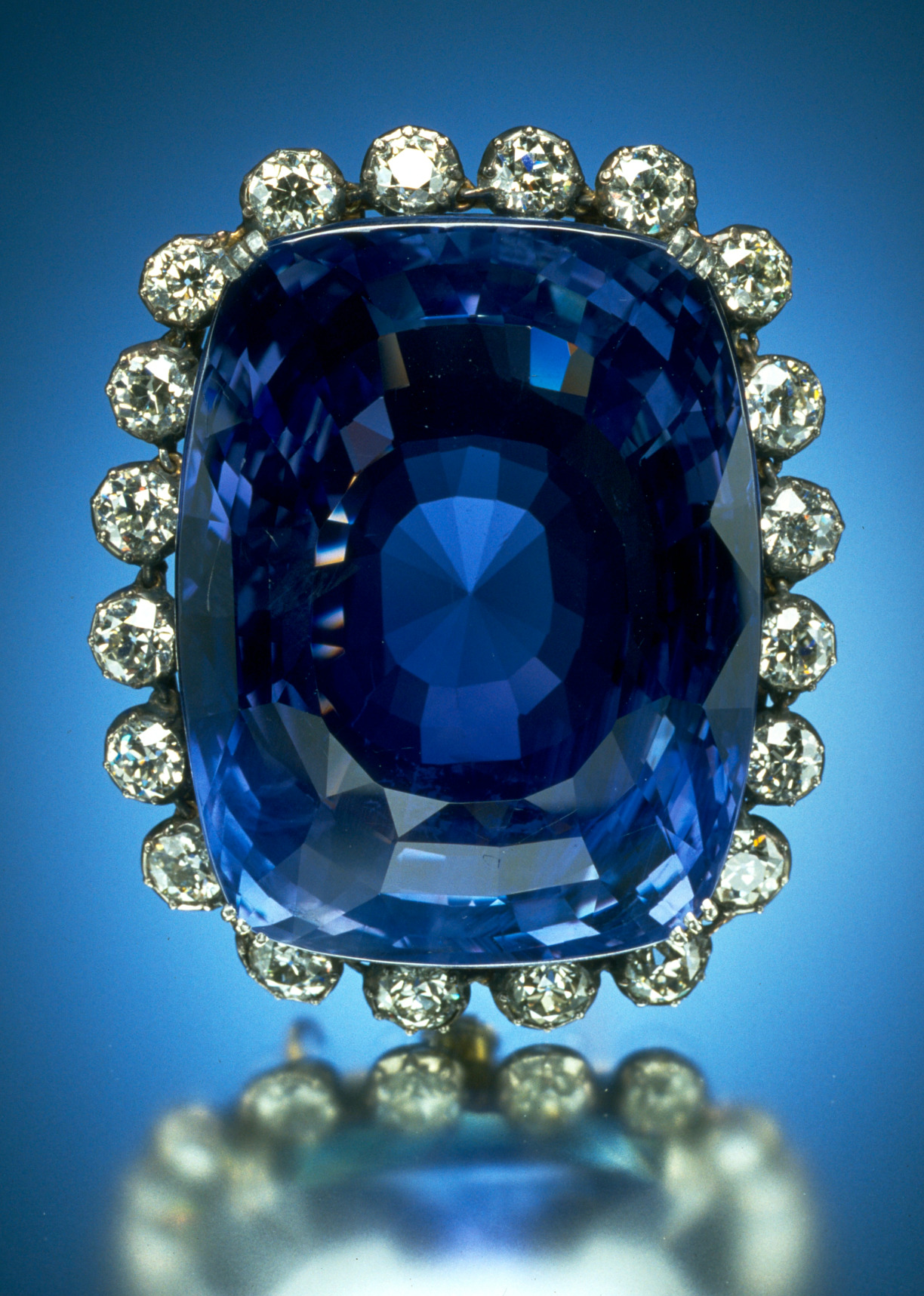
Sapphire

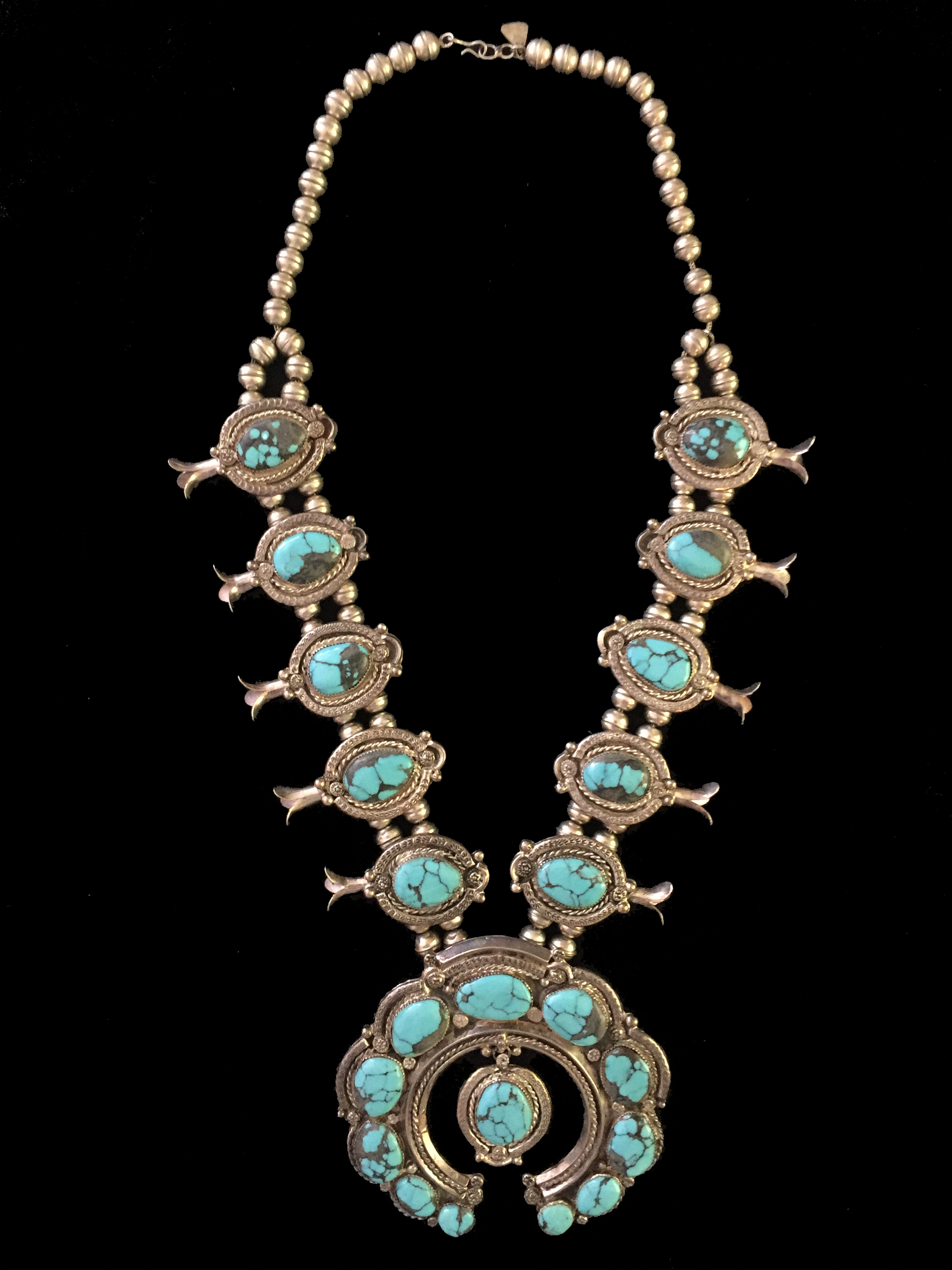
Turquoise

Many precious and semiprecious stones are used for jewellery. Aside from their color, the gemstones are selected on the basis of practical considerations: rarity (value), hardness (see Mohs scale), and optical properties such as refractive index. With these criteria, diamond, zircon, and the carborundum-based gems (sapphire, ruby) stand out.

Amber
Amber, an ancient organic gemstone, is composed of tree resin that has hardened over time. The stone must be at least one million years old to be classified as amber, and some amber can be up to 120 million years old.
Amethyst
Amethyst has historically been the most prized gemstone in the quartz family. It is treasured for its purple hue, which can range in tone from light to dark.
Emerald
Emeralds are one of the three main precious gemstones (along with rubies and sapphires) and are known for their fine green to bluish-green colour. They have been treasured throughout history, and some historians report that the Egyptians mined emeralds as early as 3500 BC.
Jade
Jade is most commonly associated with the colour green but can come in several other colours as well. Jade is closely linked to Asian culture, history, and tradition, and is sometimes referred to as the stone of heaven.
Jasper
Jasper is a gemstone of the chalcedony family that comes in a variety of colours. Often, jasper will feature unique and interesting patterns within the coloured stone. Picture jasper is a type of jasper known for the colours (often beiges and browns) and swirls in the stone's pattern.
Quartz
Quartz refers to a family of crystalline gemstones of various colours and sizes. Among the well-known types of quartz are rose quartz (which has a delicate pink colour), and smoky quartz (which comes in a variety of shades of translucent brown). Some other gemstones, such as Amethyst and Citrine, are also part of the quartz family. Rutilated quartz is a popular type of quartz containing needle-like inclusions.
Ruby
Rubies are known for their intense red colour and are among the most highly valued precious gemstones. Rubies have been treasured for millennia. In Sanskrit, the word for ruby is ratnaraj, meaning king of precious stones.
Sapphire
The most popular form of sapphire is blue sapphire, which is known for its medium to deep blue colour and strong saturation. Fancy sapphires of various colours are also available. In the United States, blue sapphire tends to be the most popular and most affordable of the three major precious gemstones (emerald, ruby, and sapphire).
Turquoise
Turquoise is found in only a few places on Earth, and the world's largest turquoise-producing region is the southwest United States. Turquoise is prized for its attractive colour, most often an intense medium blue or a greenish blue, and its ancient heritage. Turquoise is used in a great variety of jewellery styles. It is perhaps most closely associated with Southwest and Native American jewellery, but it is also used in many sleek, modern styles. Some turquoise contains a matrix of dark brown markings, which provides an interesting contrast to the gemstone's bright blue colour.

Some gemstones (like pearls, coral, and amber) are classified as organic, meaning that they are produced by living organisms. Others are inorganic, meaning that they are generally composed of and arise from minerals.

Some gems, for example, amethyst, have become less valued as methods of extracting and importing them have progressed. Some man-made gems can serve in place of natural gems, such as cubic zirconia, which can be used in place of diamonds.

=== Gold and other precious metals ===
Gold and some other precious metals are often used in jewellery making. These metal are often noble, meaning that they resist corrosion. The softness of gold can be addressed by alloying, hence a traditional focus on carat, a measure of gold content in its alloys. Gold is the only noble metal that is colored, all others are silvery.

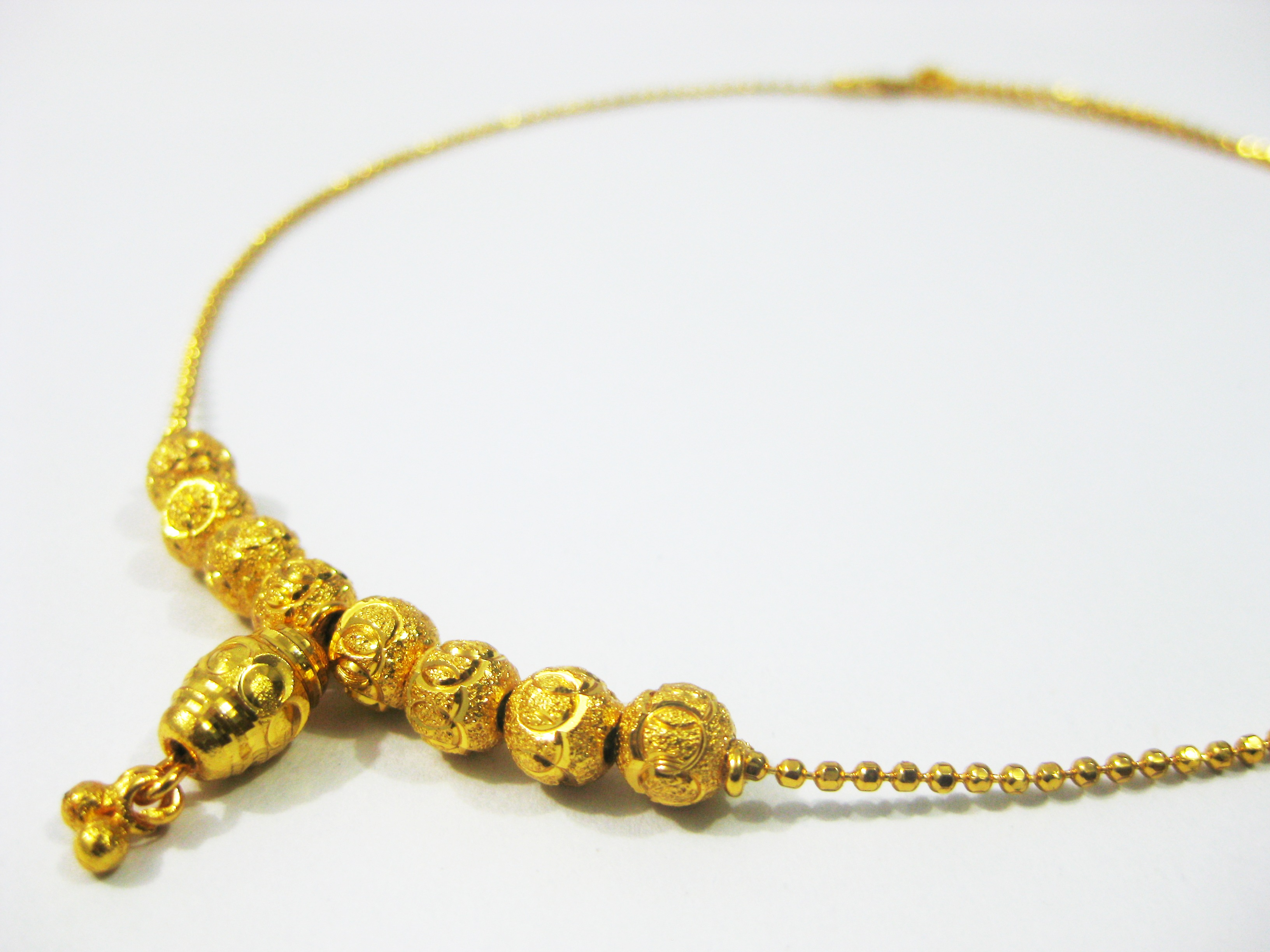
An example of gold-plated jewellery.

For platinum, gold, and silver jewellery, there are many techniques to create finishes. The most common are high-polish, satin/matte, brushed, and hammered. High-polished jewellery is the most common and gives the metal a highly reflective, shiny look. Satin, or matte finish reduces the shine and reflection of the jewellery, and this is commonly used to accentuate gemstones such as diamonds. Brushed finishes give the jewellery a textured look and are created by brushing a material (similar to sandpaper) against the metal, leaving "brush strokes". Hammered finishes are typically created using a rounded steel hammer and hammering the jewellery to give it a wavy texture.

Some jewellery is plated to give it a shiny, reflective look or to achieve a desired colour. Sterling silver jewellery may be plated with a thin layer of 0.999 fine silver (a process known as flashing) or plated with rhodium or gold. Base metal costume jewellery may also be plated with silver, gold, or rhodium for a more attractive finish.

== Impact on society ==
Jewellery has been used to denote status. In ancient Rome, only certain ranks could wear rings and later, sumptuary laws dictated who could wear what type of jewellery. This was also based on the rank of the citizens of that time.

Cultural dictates have also played a significant role. For example, the wearing of earrings by Western men was considered effeminate in the 19th century and early 20th century. More recently, the display of body jewellery, such as piercings, has become a mark of acceptance or seen as a badge of courage within some groups but is completely rejected in others. Likewise, hip-hop culture has popularised the slang term bling-bling, which refers to the ostentatious display of jewellery by men or women.

Conversely, the jewellery industry in the early 20th century launched a campaign to popularise wedding rings for men, which caught on, as well as engagement rings for men, which did not, going so far as to create a false history and claim that the practice had medieval roots. By the mid-1940s, 85% of weddings in the U.S. featured a double-ring ceremony, up from 15% in the 1920s.

Some religions have specific rules or traditions surrounding jewellery (or even prohibiting it) and many religions have edicts against excessive display. Islam, for instance, considers the wearing of gold by men as Haraam. The majority of Islamic jewellery was in the form of bridal dowries, and traditionally was not handed down from generation to generation; instead, on a woman's death it was sold at the souk and recycled or sold to passers-by. Islamic jewellery from before the 19th century is thus exceedingly rare.

== History ==
The history of jewellery is long and goes back many years, with many different uses among different cultures. It has endured for thousands of years and has provided various insights into how ancient cultures worked.

=== Prehistory ===
The National Jewellery Museum of Morocco in Rabat displays a reproduction of perforated shell beads. The original beads are the oldest known pieces of such artefacts dated to about 142,000 years. They were found in 2019 by archaeologists in the Bizmoune cave near Essaouira, Morocco, and show perforations indicating purposeful processing that may have been a token of identity. Other perforated beads made from small seashells by Neanderthals have been found dating to 115,000 years ago in the Cueva de los Aviones, a cave along the southeast coast of Spain. Later in Kenya, at Enkapune Ya Muto, beads made from perforated ostrich eggshells have been dated to more than 40,000 years ago. In Russia, a stone bracelet and marble ring are attributed to a similar age.

Later, the European early modern humans had crude necklaces and bracelets of bone, teeth, berries, and stone hung on pieces of string or animal sinew, or pieces of carved bone used to secure clothing together. In some cases, jewellery had shell or mother-of-pearl pieces. A decorated engraved pendant (the Star Carr Pendant) dating to around 11,000 BC, and thought to be the oldest Mesolithic art in Britain, was found at the site of Star Carr in North Yorkshire in 2015. In southern Russia, carved bracelets made of mammoth tusk have been found. The Venus of Hohle Fels features a perforation at the top, showing that it was intended to be worn as a pendant.

Around seven thousand years ago, the first sign of copper jewellery was seen. In October 2012, the Museum of Ancient History in Lower Austria revealed that they had found a grave of a female jewellery worker – forcing archaeologists to take a fresh look at prehistoric gender roles after it appeared to be that of a female fine metal worker – a profession that was previously thought to have been carried out exclusively by men.

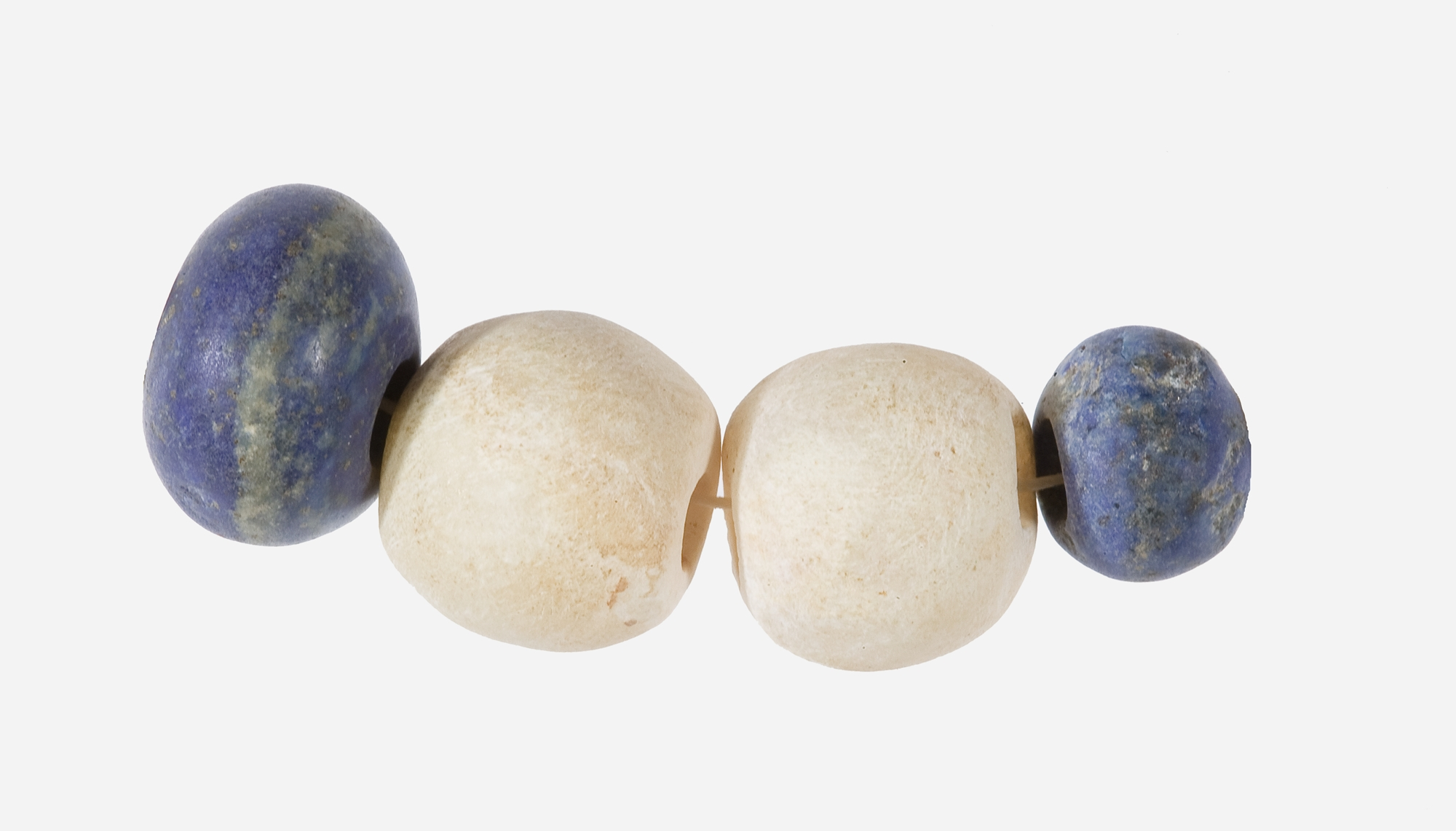
String of beads; 3650–3100 BC; lapis lazuli (the blue beads) and travertine (the white beads) (Egyptian alabaster); length: 4.5 centimetres (1.8 in); by Naqada II or Naqada III cultures; Metropolitan Museum of Art (New York City)

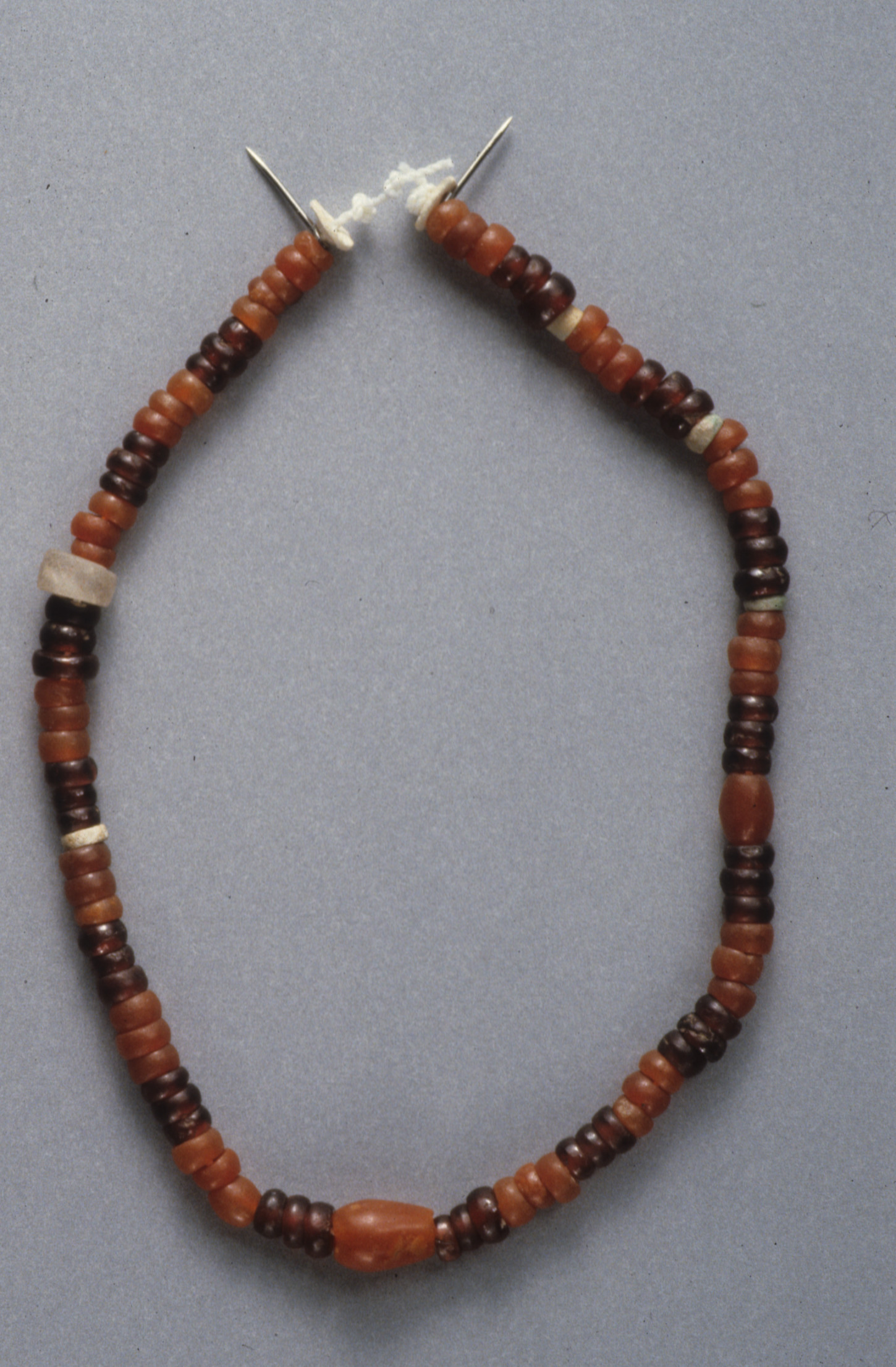
String of beads; 3300–3100 BC; carnelian, garnet, quartz and glazed steatite; length: 20.5 centimetres (8.1 in); by Naqada III culture Metropolitan Museum of Art

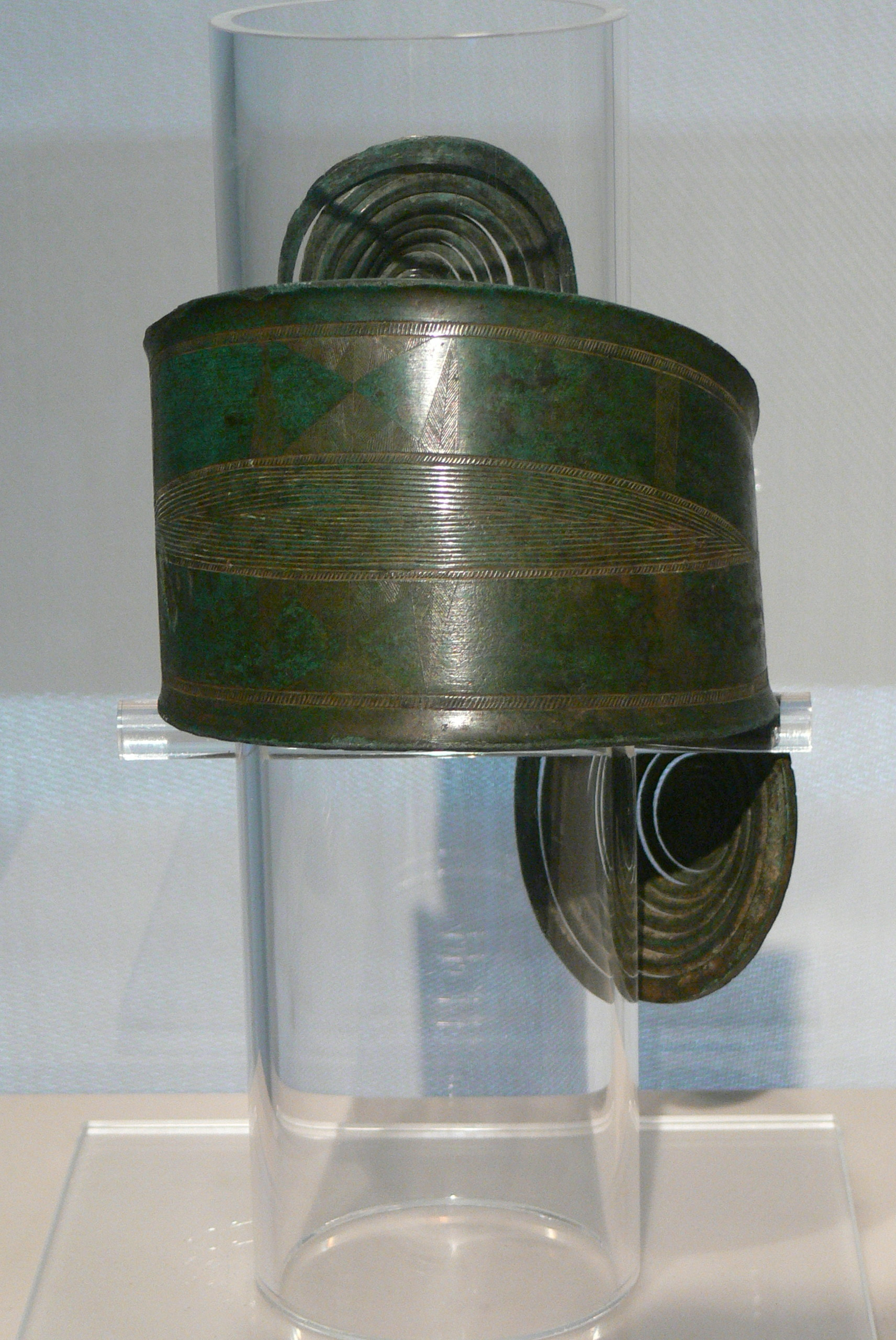
Armlet with sun symbol; 16th–13th century BC (late Bronze Age); bronze; German National Museum (Nuremberg)

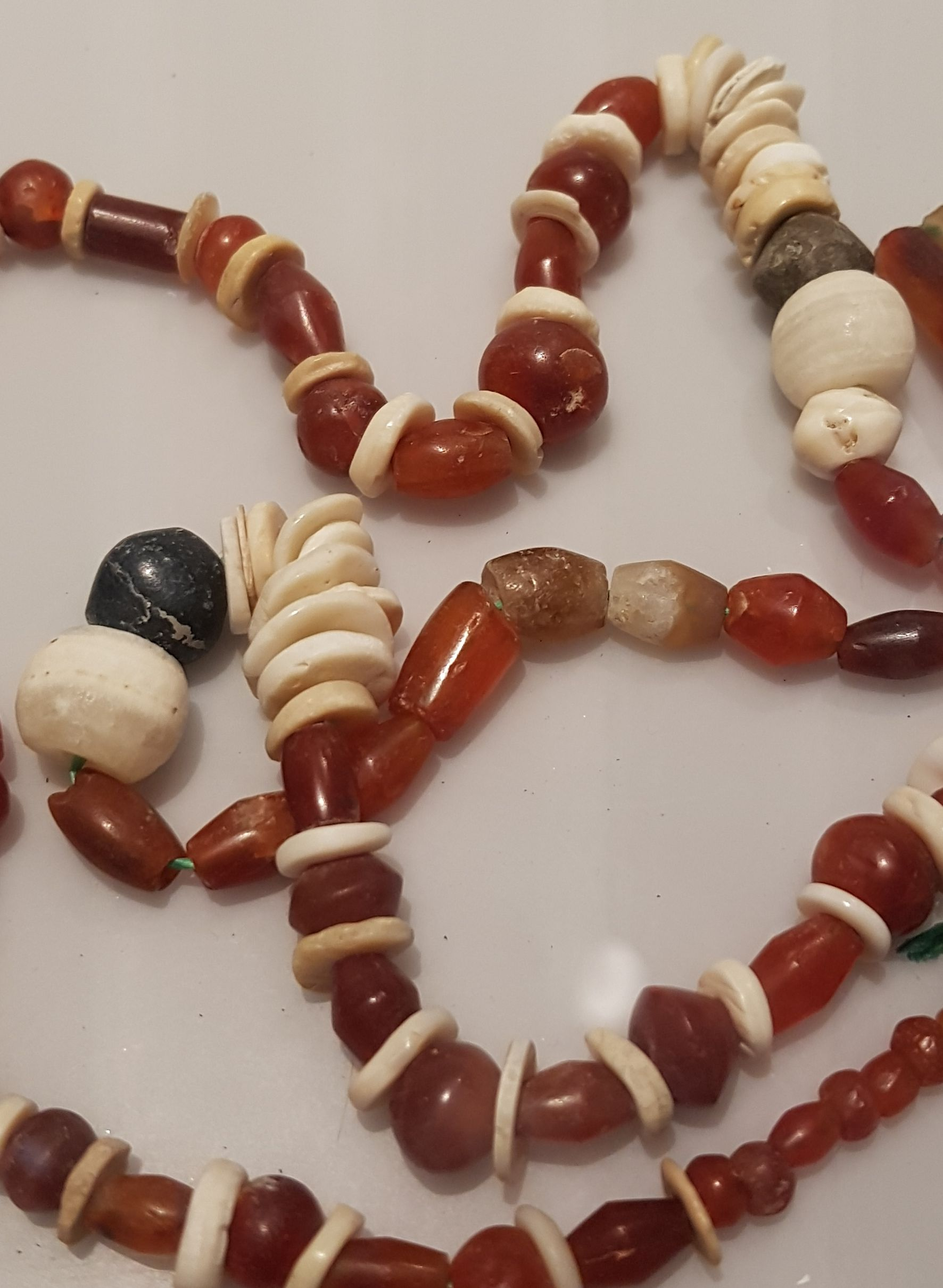
Necklace; probably 2600–1300 BC; carnelian, bone and stone; from Saruq Al Hadid (the United Arab Emirates)

=== Africa ===
==== Egypt ====
The first signs of established jewellery making in Ancient Egypt was around 3,000–5,000 years ago. The Egyptians preferred the luxury, rarity, and workability of gold over other metals. In Predynastic Egypt jewellery soon began to symbolise political and religious power in the community. Although it was worn by wealthy Egyptians in life, it was also worn by them in death, with jewellery commonly placed among grave goods.

In conjunction with gold jewellery, Egyptians used coloured glass, along with semi-precious gems. The colour of the jewellery had significance. Green, for example, symbolised fertility. Lapis lazuli and silver had to be imported from beyond the country's borders.

Egyptian designs were most common in Phoenician jewellery. Also, ancient Turkish designs found in Persian jewellery suggest that trade between the Middle East and Europe was not uncommon. Women wore elaborate gold and silver pieces that were used in ceremonies.

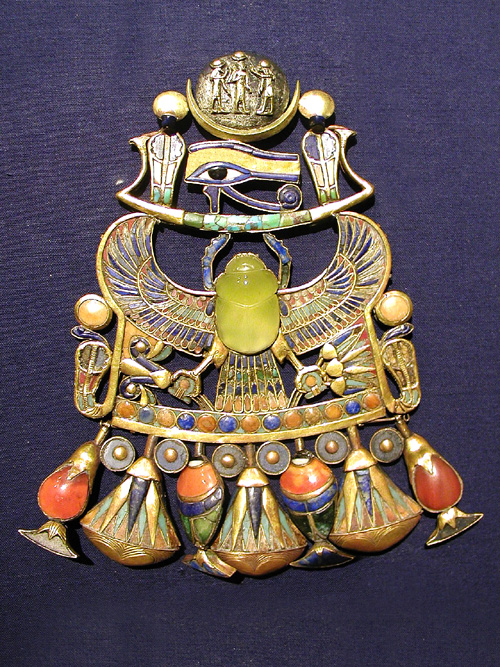
Pectoral (chest jewellery) of Tutankhamun; 1336–1327 BC (Reign of Tutankhamun); gold, silver and meteoric glass; height: 14.9 cm (5.9 in); Egyptian Museum (Cairo)

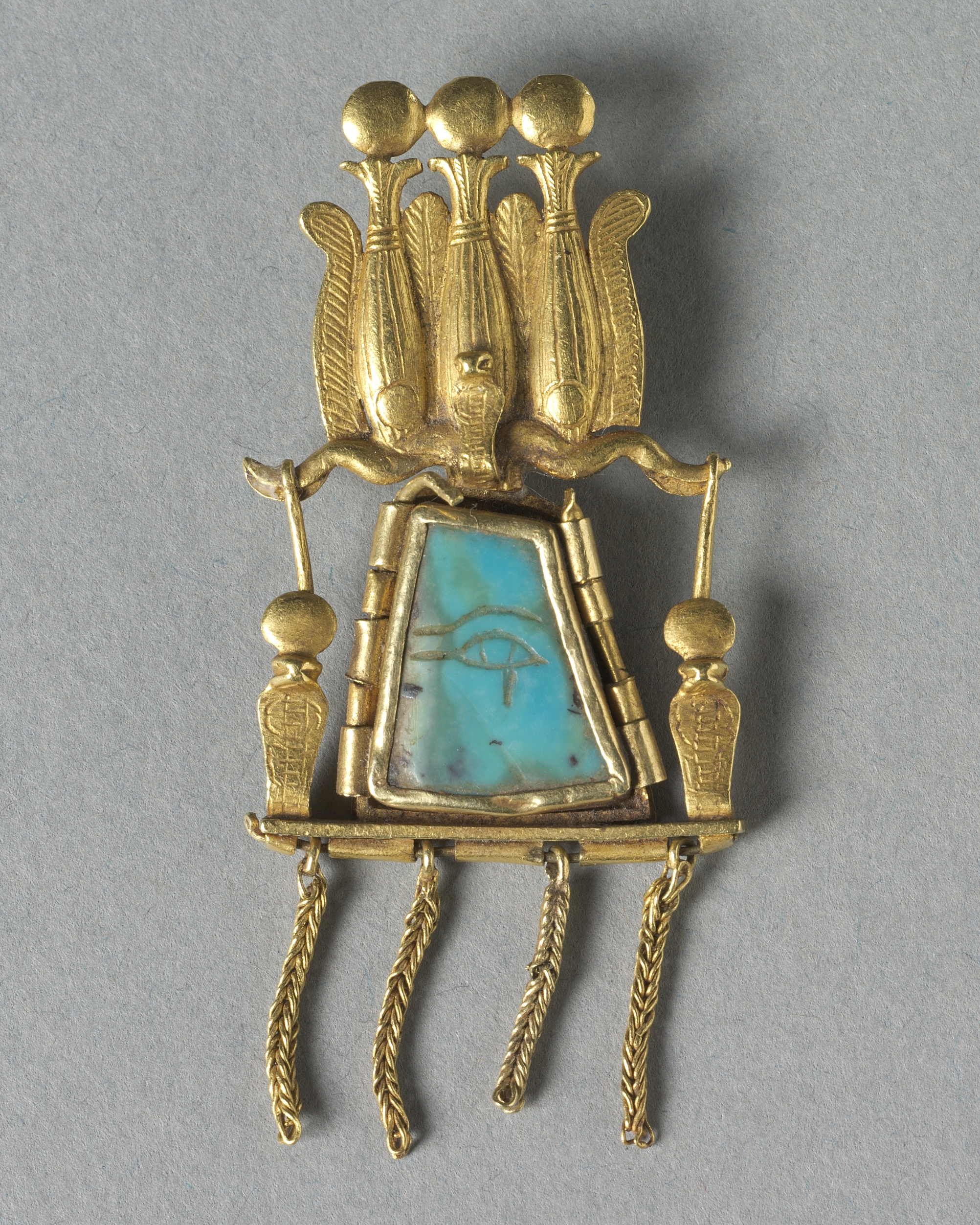
Pendant; c. 1069 BC; gold and turquoise; overall: 5.1 by 2.3 centimetres (2.01 in × 0.91 in); Cleveland Museum of Art (Cleveland)

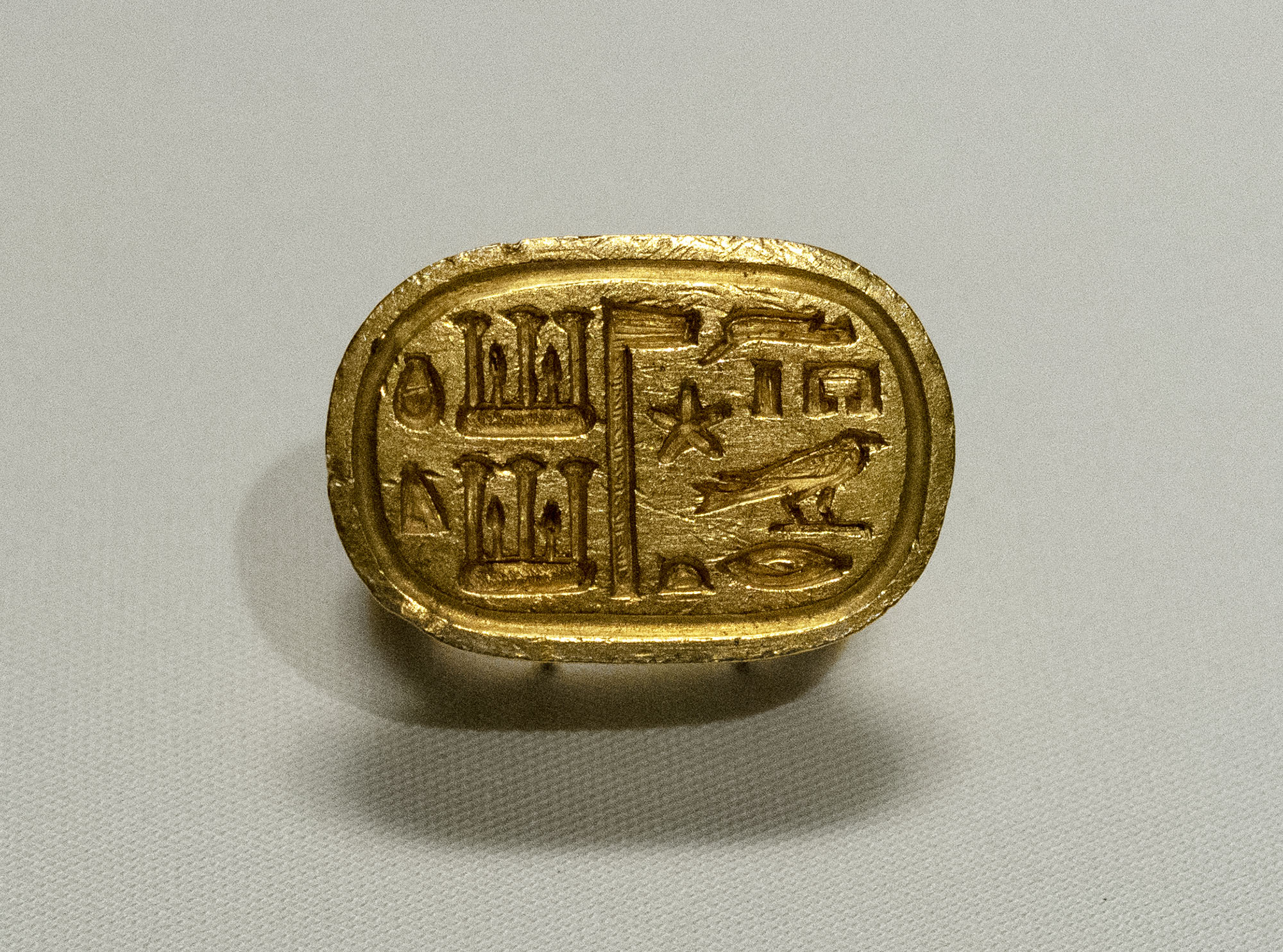
Signet ring; 664–525 BC; gold; diameter: 3 by 3.4 centimetres (1.2 in × 1.3 in); British Museum (London)

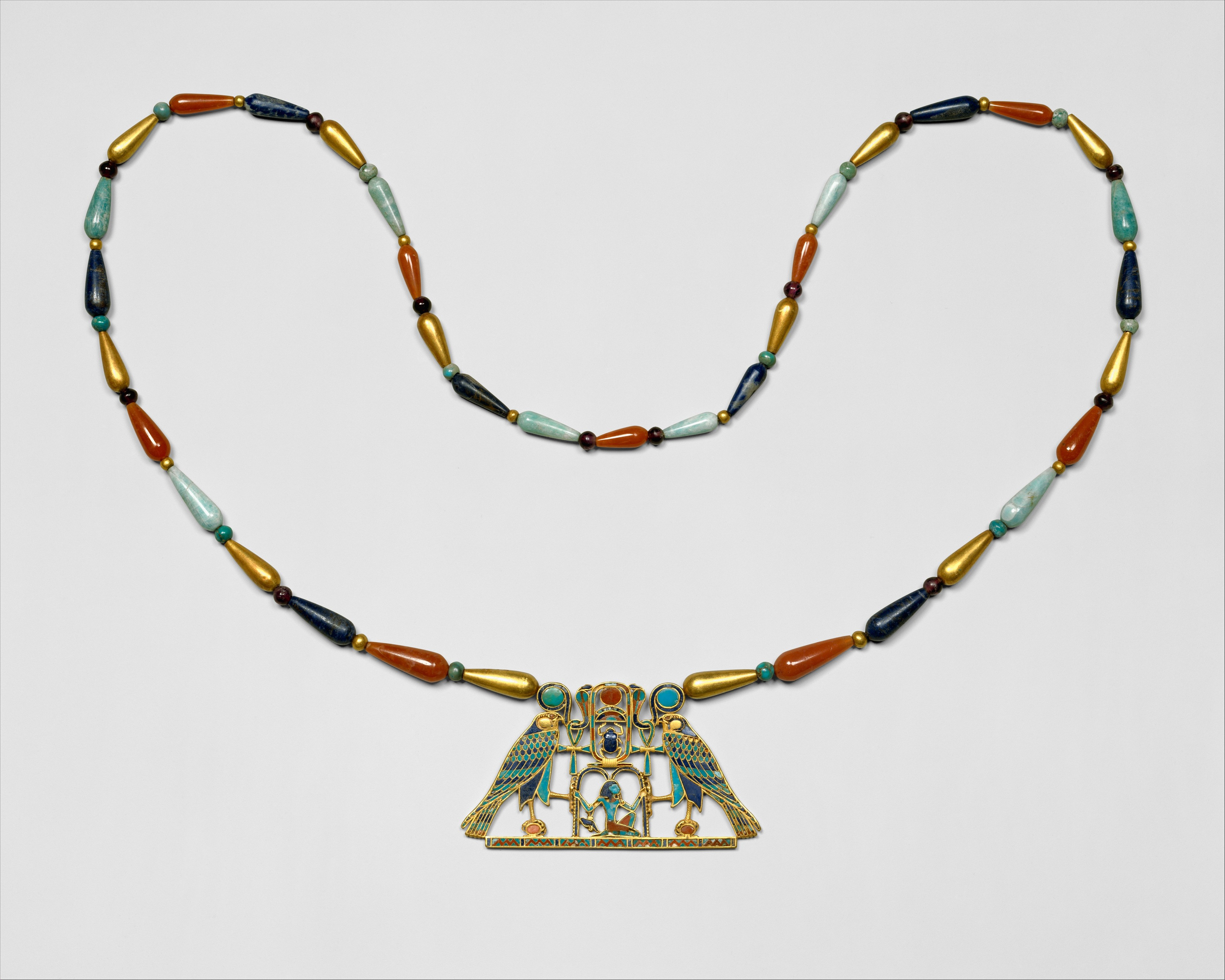
Pectoral and necklace of Princess Sithathoriunet; 1887–1813 BC; gold, carnelian, lapis lazuli, turquoise, garnet and feldspar; height of the pectoral: 4.5 centimetres (1.8 in); Metropolitan Museum of Art (New York City)

==== Maghreb countries in North Africa ====
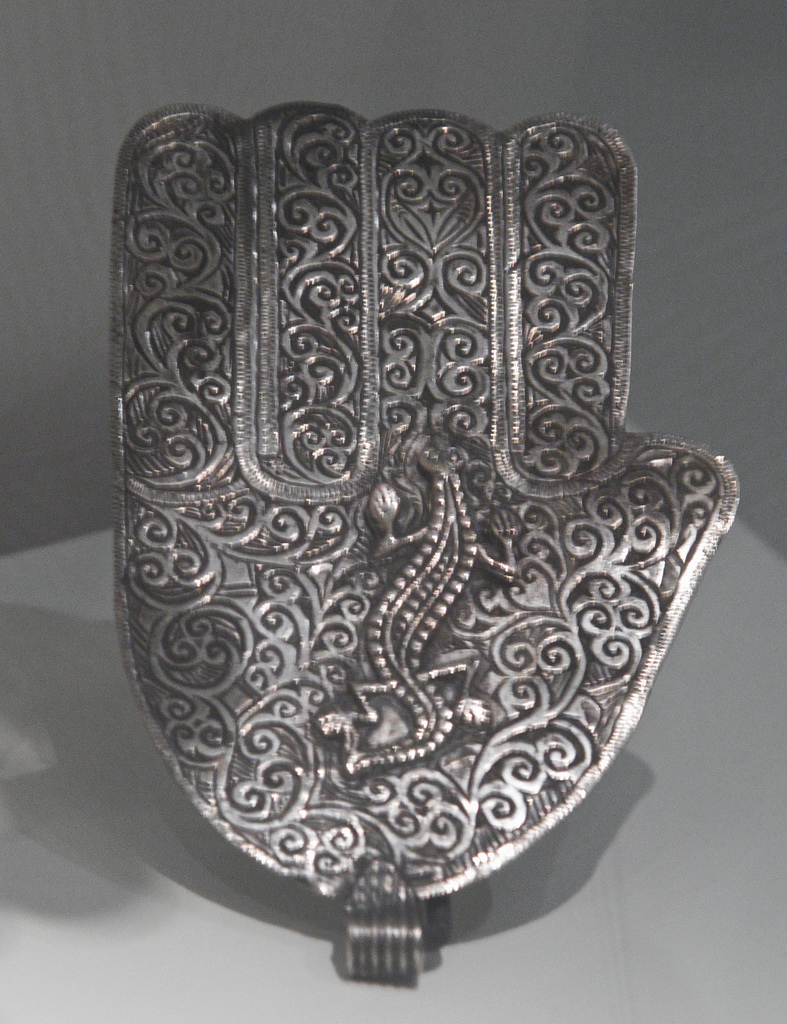
Khmissa amulet in silver

Jewellery of the Berber cultures is a style of traditional jewellery worn by women and girls in the rural areas of the Maghreb region in North Africa inhabited by indigenous Berber people (in Berber language: Amazigh, Imazighen, pl). Following long social and cultural traditions, the silversmiths of different ethnic Berber groups of Morocco, Algeria and neighbouring countries created intricate jewellery to adorn their women and that formed part of their ethnic identity. Traditional Berber jewellery was usually made of silver and includes elaborate brooches made of triangular plates and pins (fibula), originally used as clasps for garments, but also necklaces, bracelets, earrings and similar items.

Another major type is the so-called khmissa (local pronunciation of the Arabic word "khamsa" for the number "five"), which is called afus in the Berber language (Tamazight). This form represents the five fingers of the hand and is traditionally believed both by Muslims as well as Jewish people to protect against the evil eye.

=== Europe and the Middle East ===
==== The first gold jewellery from Bulgaria ====
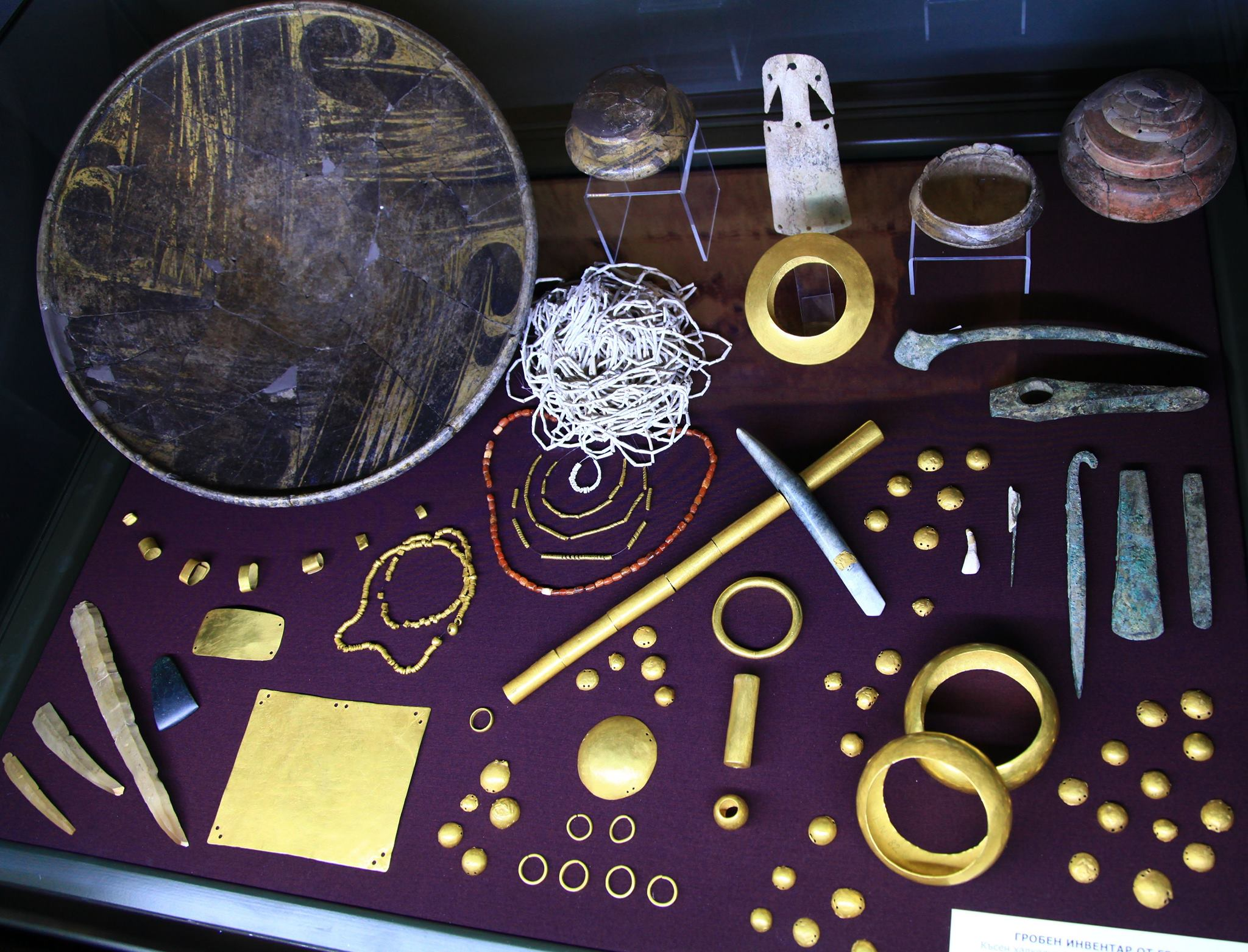
Oldest golden artifacts in the world from Varna necropolis – grave offerings on exposition in Varna Museum

The oldest gold jewellery in the world is dating from 4,600 BC to 4,200 BC and was discovered in Europe, at the site of Varna Necropolis, near the Black Sea coast in Bulgaria.

==== Mesopotamia ====
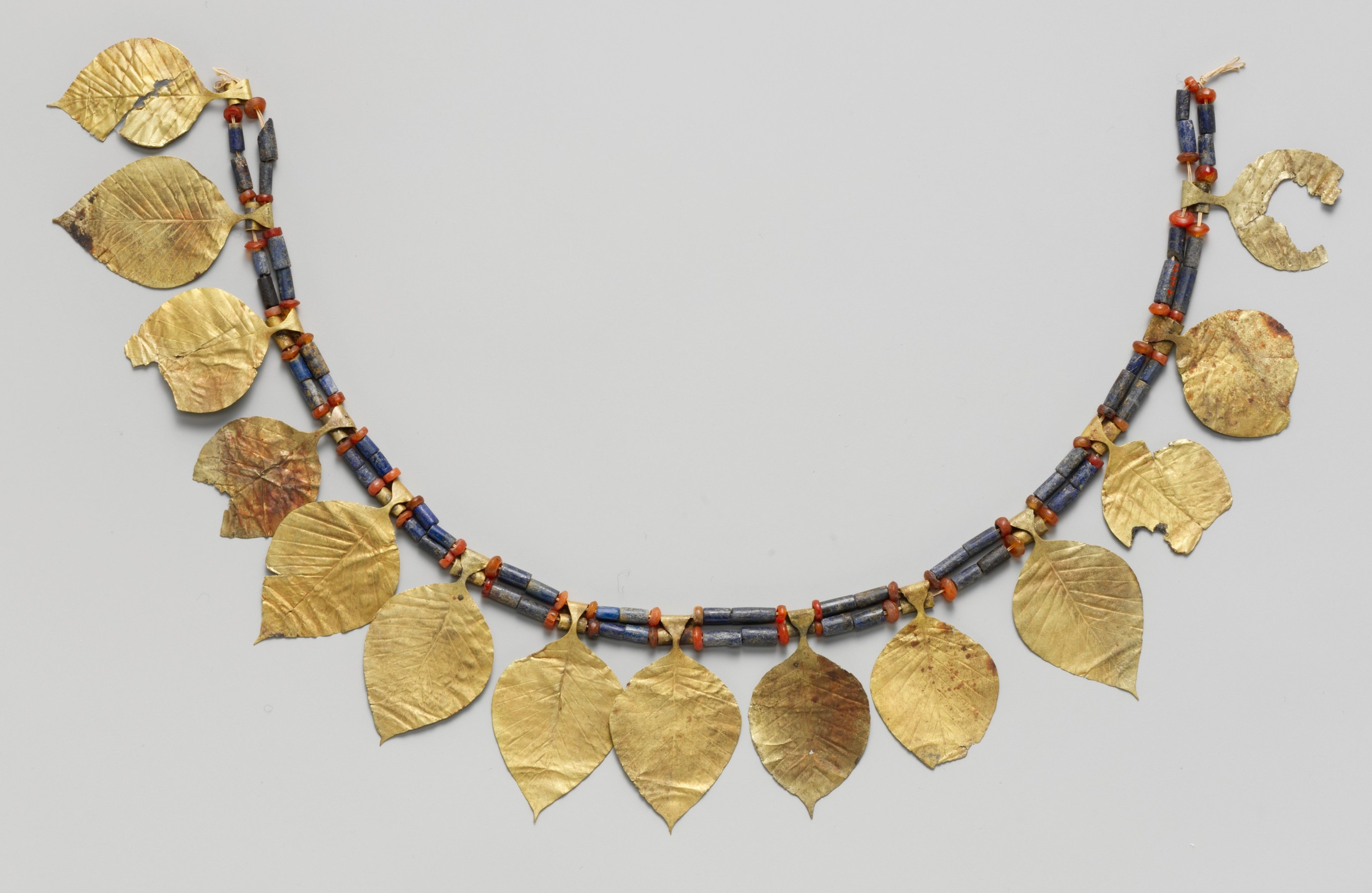
Headdress decorated with golden leaves; 2600–2400 BC; gold, lapis lazuli and carnelian; length: 38.5 centimetres (15.2 in); from the Royal Cemetery at Ur; Metropolitan Museum of Art (New York City)

By approximately 5,000 years ago, jewellery-making had become a significant craft in the cities of Mesopotamia. The most significant archaeological evidence comes from the Royal Cemetery of Ur, where hundreds of burials dating 2900–2300 BC were unearthed; tombs such as that of Puabi contained a multitude of artefacts in gold, silver, and semi-precious stones, such as lapis lazuli crowns embellished with gold figurines, close-fitting collar necklaces, and jewel-headed pins. In Assyria, men and women both wore extensive amounts of jewellery, including amulets, ankle bracelets, heavy multi-strand necklaces, and cylinder seals.

Jewellery in Mesopotamia tended to be manufactured from thin metal leaf and was set with large numbers of brightly coloured stones (chiefly agate, lapis, carnelian, and jasper). Favoured shapes included leaves, spirals, cones, and bunches of grapes. Jewellers created works both for human use and for adorning statues and idols. They employed a wide variety of sophisticated metalworking techniques, such as cloisonné, engraving, fine granulation, and filigree.

Extensive and meticulously maintained records pertaining to the trade and manufacture of jewellery have also been unearthed throughout Mesopotamian archaeological sites. One record in the Mari royal archives, for example, gives the composition of various items of jewellery:

- 1 necklace of flat speckled chalcedony beads including: 34 flat speckled chalcedony bead, [and] 35 gold fluted beads, in groups of five.
- 1 necklace of flat speckled chalcedony beads including: 39 flat speckled chalcedony beads, [with] 41 fluted beads in a group that make up the hanging device.
- 1 necklace with rounded lapis lazuli beads including: 28 rounded lapis lazuli beads, [and] 29 fluted beads for its clasp.

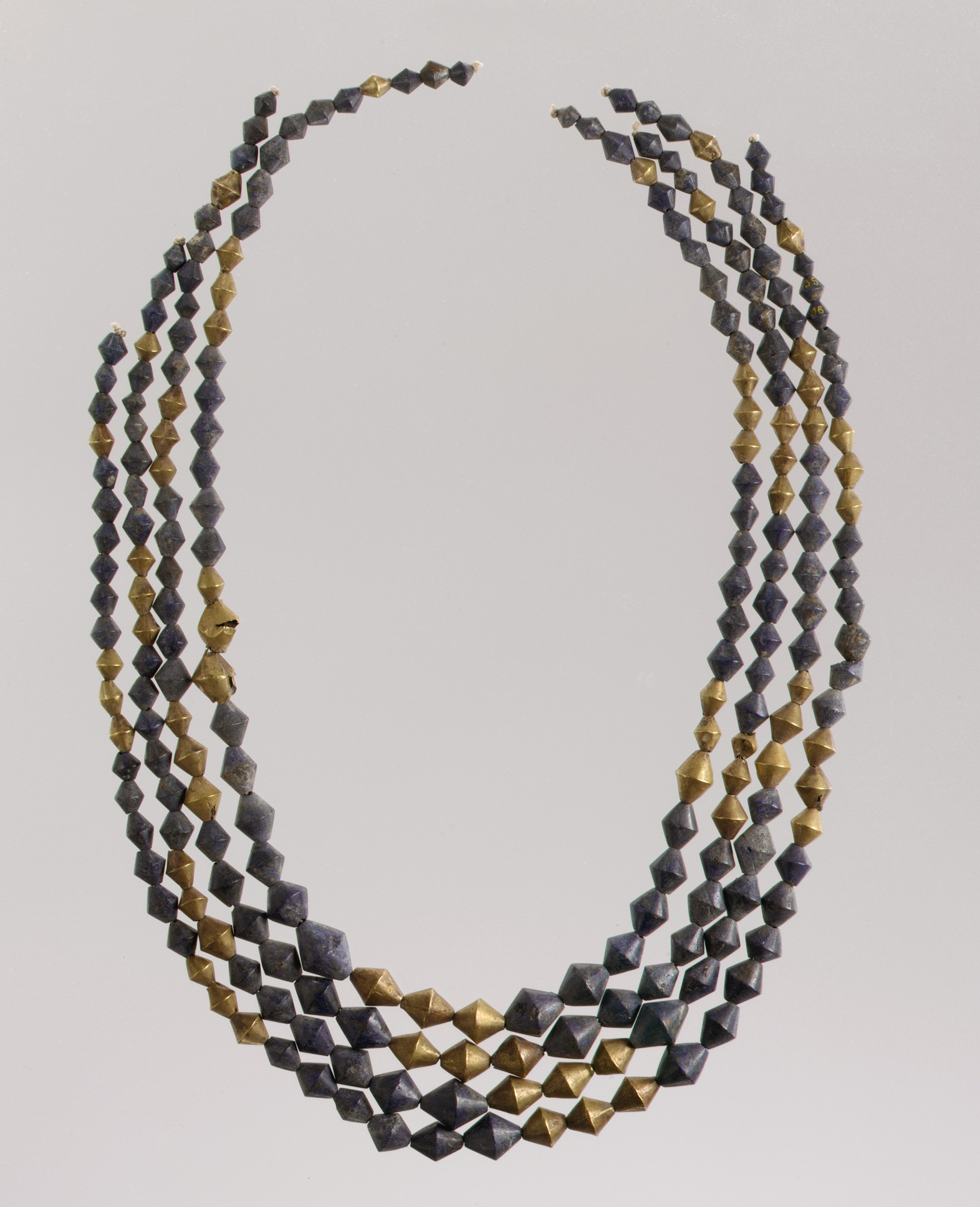
Sumerian necklace beads; 2600–2500 BC; gold and lapis lazuli; length: 54 centimetres (21 in); Metropolitan Museum of Art

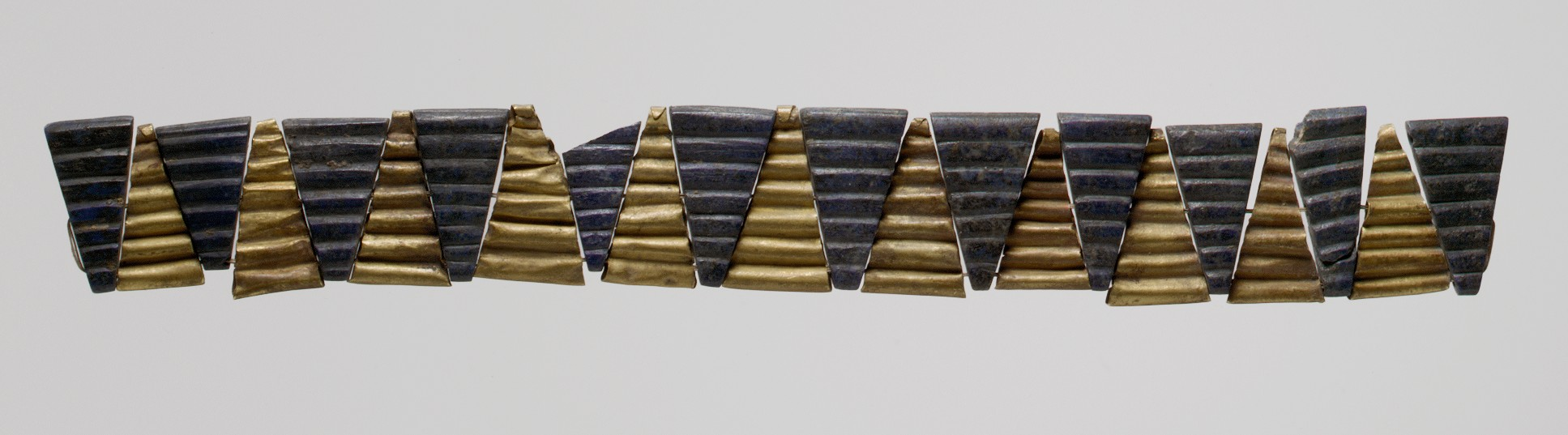
Necklace; 2600–2500 BC; gold and lapis lazuli; length: 22.5 centimetres (8.9 in); Royal Cemetery at Ur (Iraq); Metropolitan Museum of Art

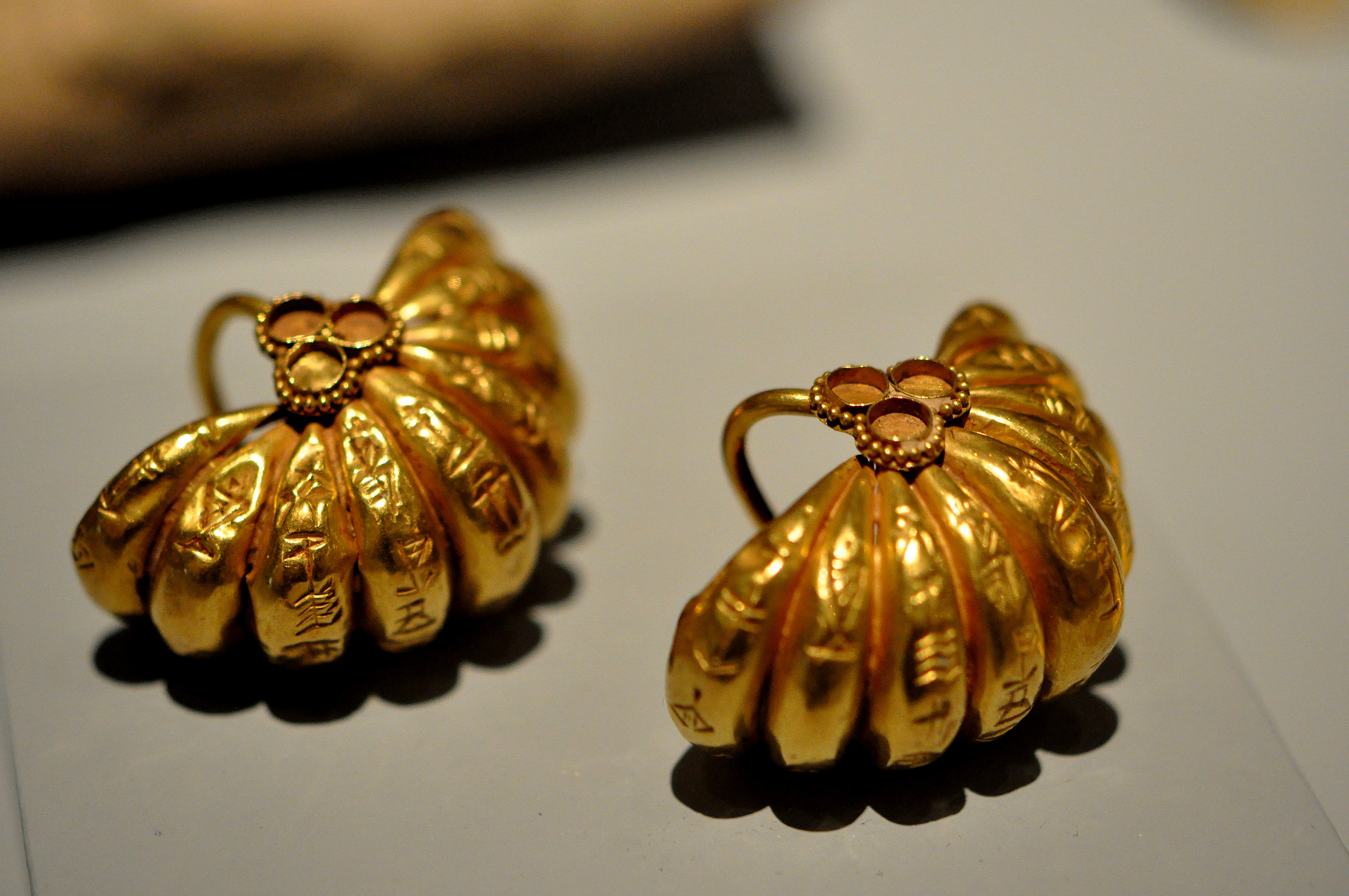
Pair of earrings with cuneiform inscriptions, 2093–2046 BC; gold; Sulaymaniyah Museum (Sulaymaniyah, Iraq)

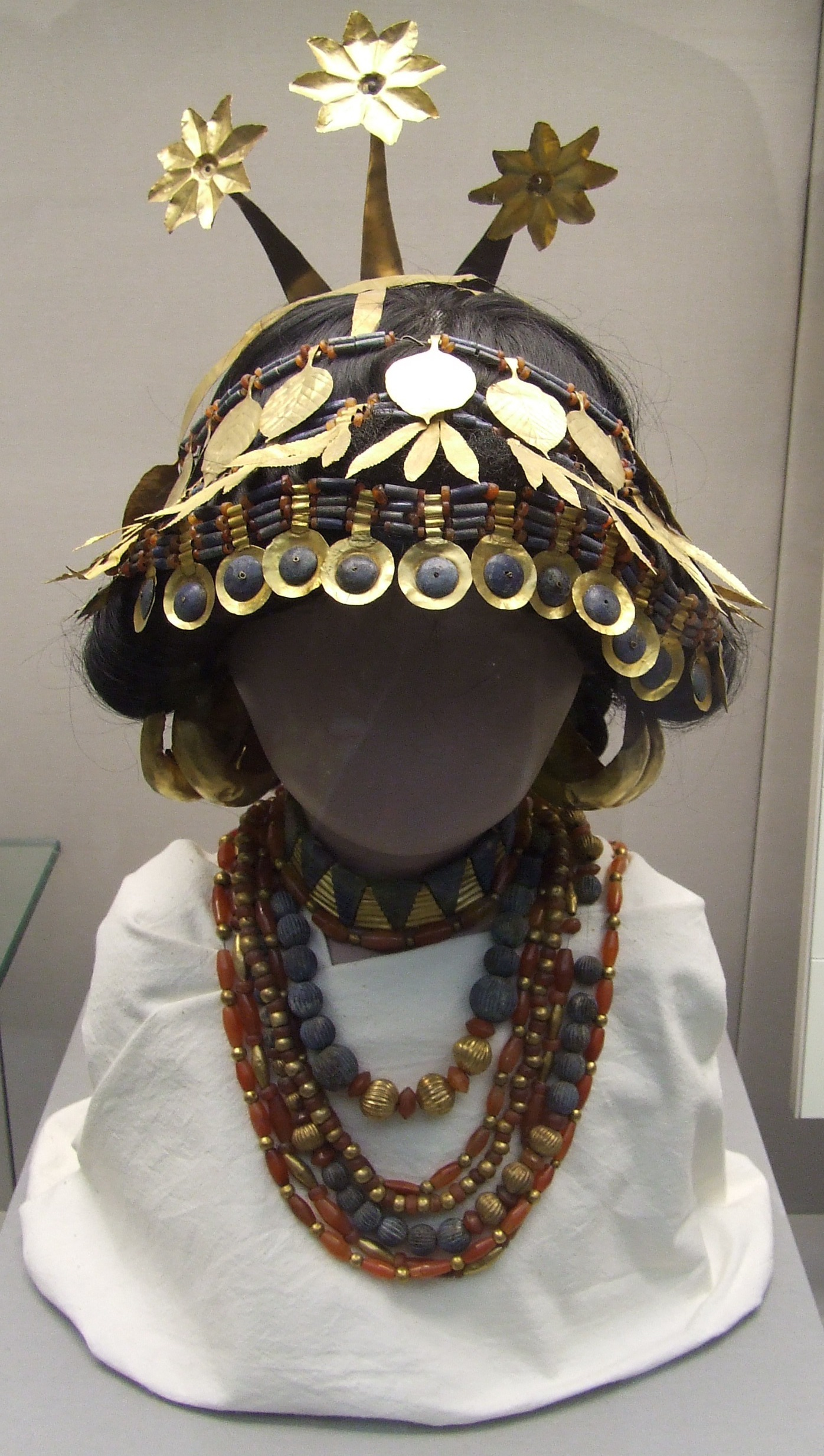
Sumerian necklaces and headgear discovered in the royal (and individual) graves of the Royal Cemetery at Ur, showing the way they may have been worn, in British Museum (London)

==== Greece ====
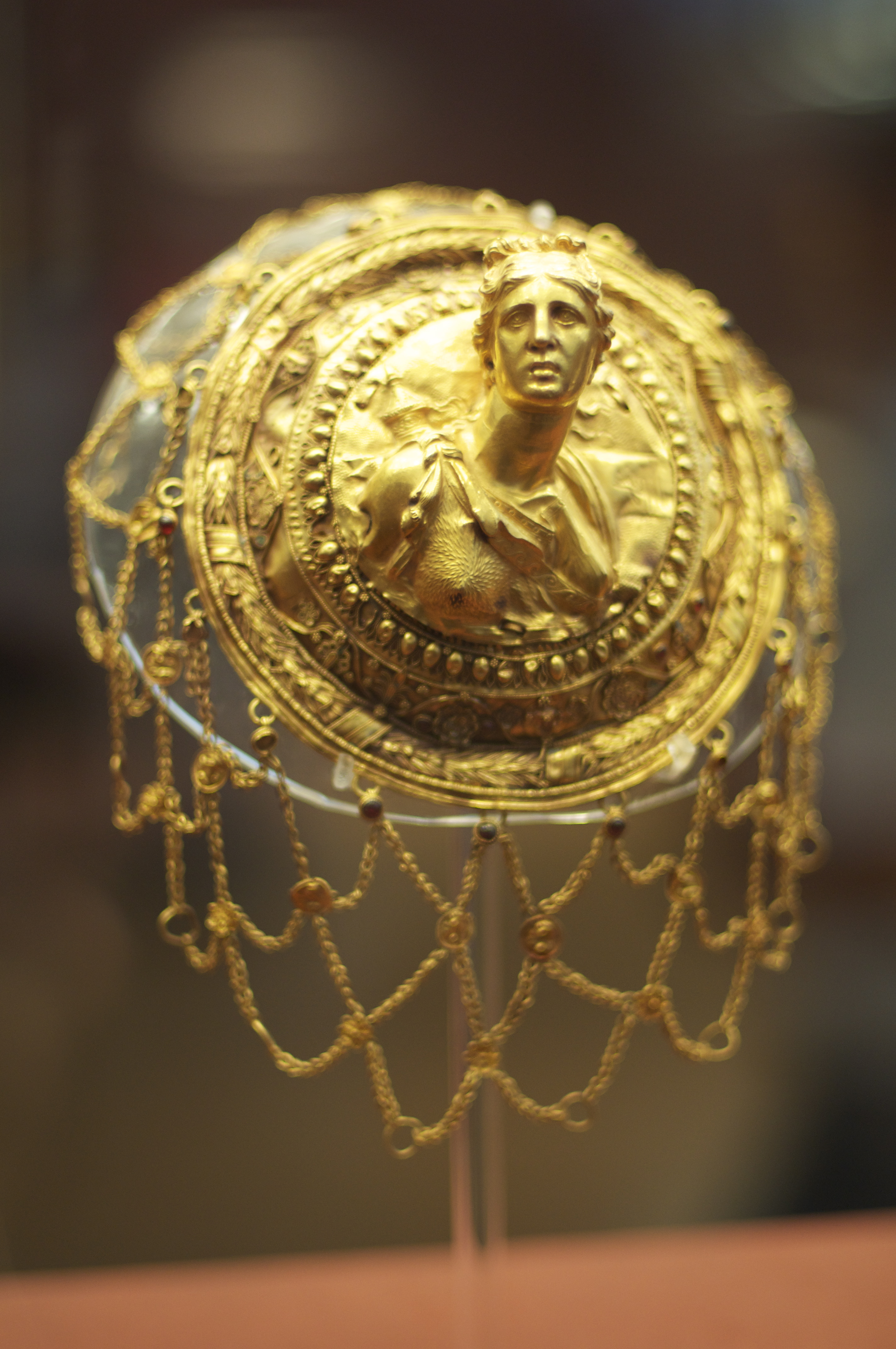
Openwork hairnet; 300–200 BC; gold; diameter: 23 centimetres (9.1 in), diameter of the medallion: 11.4 centimetres (4.5 in); unknown provenance (said to be from Karpenissi (Greece)); National Archaeological Museum (Athens)

The Greeks started using gold and gems in jewellery in 1600 BC, although beads shaped as shells and animals were produced widely in earlier times. Around 1500 BC, the main techniques of working gold in Greece included casting, twisting bars, and making wire. Many of these sophisticated techniques were popular in the Mycenaean period, but unfortunately this skill was lost at the end of the Bronze Age. The forms and shapes of jewellery in ancient Greece such as the armring (13th century BC), brooch (10th century BC) and pins (7th century BC), have varied widely since the Bronze Age as well. Other forms of jewellery include wreaths, earrings, necklace and bracelets. A good example of the high quality that gold working techniques could achieve in Greece is the 'Gold Olive Wreath' (4th century BC), which is modelled on the type of wreath given as a prize for winners in athletic competitions like the Olympic Games. Jewellery dating from 600 to 475 BC is not well represented in the archaeological record, but after the Persian wars the quantity of jewellery again became more plentiful. One particularly popular type of design at this time was a bracelet decorated with snake and animal-heads. Because these bracelets used considerably more metal, many examples were made from bronze. By 300 BC, the Greeks had mastered making coloured jewellery and using amethysts, pearl, and emeralds. Also, the first signs of cameos appeared, with the Greeks creating them from Indian Sardonyx, a striped brown pink and cream agate stone. Greek jewellery was often simpler than in other cultures, with simple designs and workmanship. However, as time progressed, the designs grew in complexity and different materials were soon used.

Jewellery in Greece was hardly worn and was mostly used for public appearances or on special occasions. It was frequently given as a gift and was predominantly worn by women to show their wealth, social status, and beauty. The jewellery was often supposed to give the wearer protection from the "evil eye" or endowed the owner with supernatural powers, while others had a religious symbolism. Older pieces of jewellery that have been found were dedicated to the Gods.

They worked two styles of pieces: cast pieces and pieces hammered out of sheet metal. Fewer pieces of cast jewellery have been recovered. It was made by casting the metal onto two stone or clay moulds. The two-halves were then joined, and wax, followed by molten metal, was placed in the centre. This technique had been practised since the late Bronze Age. The more common form of jewellery was the hammered sheet type. Sheets of metal would be hammered to thickness and then soldered together. The inside of the two sheets would be filled with wax or another liquid to preserve the metal work. Different techniques, such as using a stamp or engraving, were then used to create motifs on the jewellery. Jewels may then be added to hollows or glass poured into special cavities on the surface.

The Greeks took much of their designs from outer origins, such as Asia, when Alexander the Great conquered part of it. In earlier designs, other European influences can also be detected. When Roman rule came to Greece, no change in jewellery designs was detected. However, by 27 BC, Greek designs were heavily influenced by the Roman culture. That is not to say that indigenous design did not thrive. Numerous polychrome butterfly pendants on silver foxtail chains, dating from the 1st century, have been found near Olbia, with only one example ever found anywhere else.

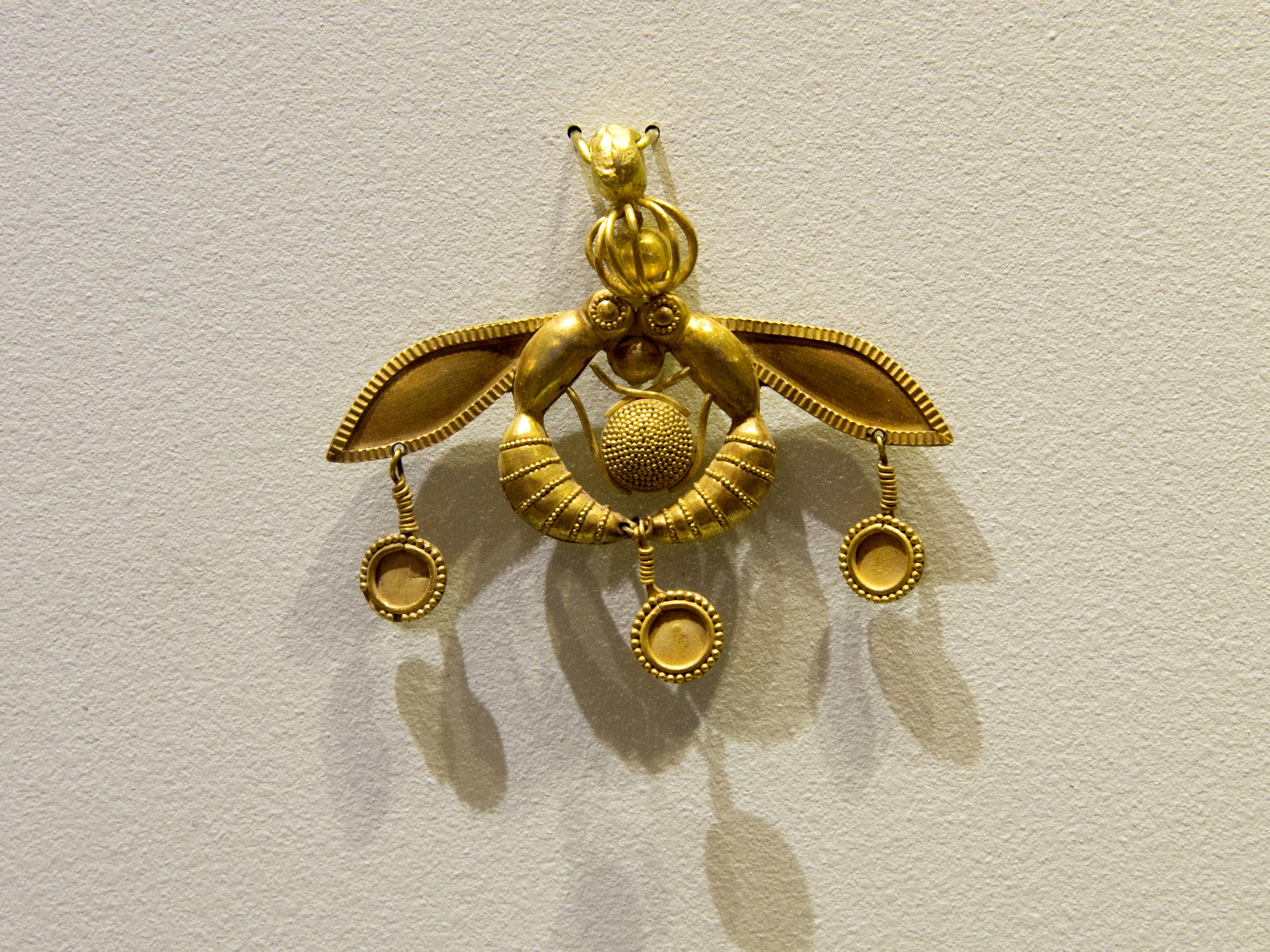
The Bee Pendant, an iconic Minoan jewel; 1700–1600 BC; gold; width: 4.6 centimetres (1.8 in); from Chrysolakkos (gold pit) complex at Malia; Archaeological Museum of Heraklion (Heraklion, Greece)

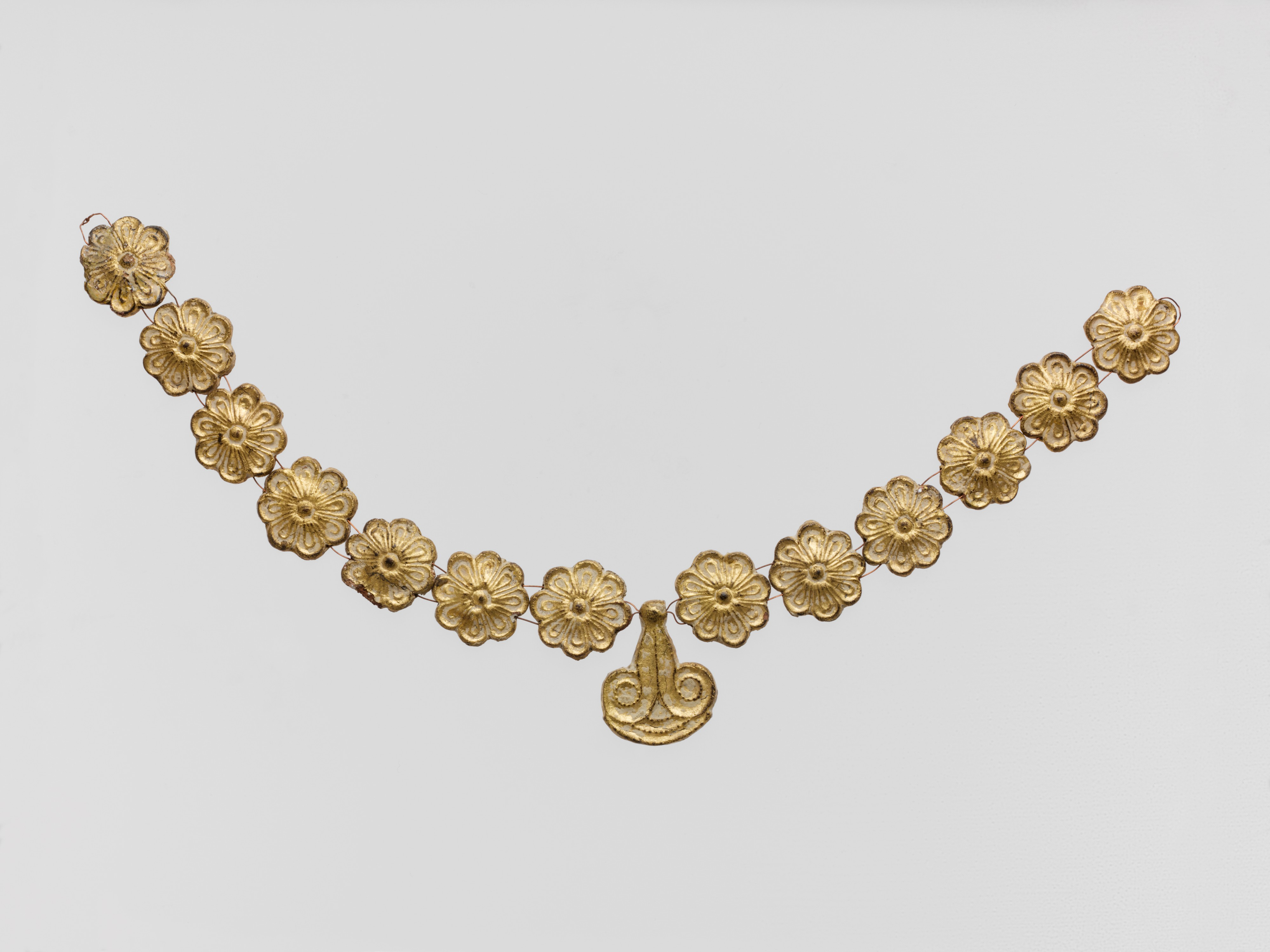
Mycenaean necklace; 1400–1050 BC; gilded terracotta; diameter of the rosettes: 2.7 centimetres (1.1 in), with variations of circa 0.1 centimetres (0.039 in), length of the pendant 3.7 centimetres (1.5 in); Metropolitan Museum of Art (New York City)

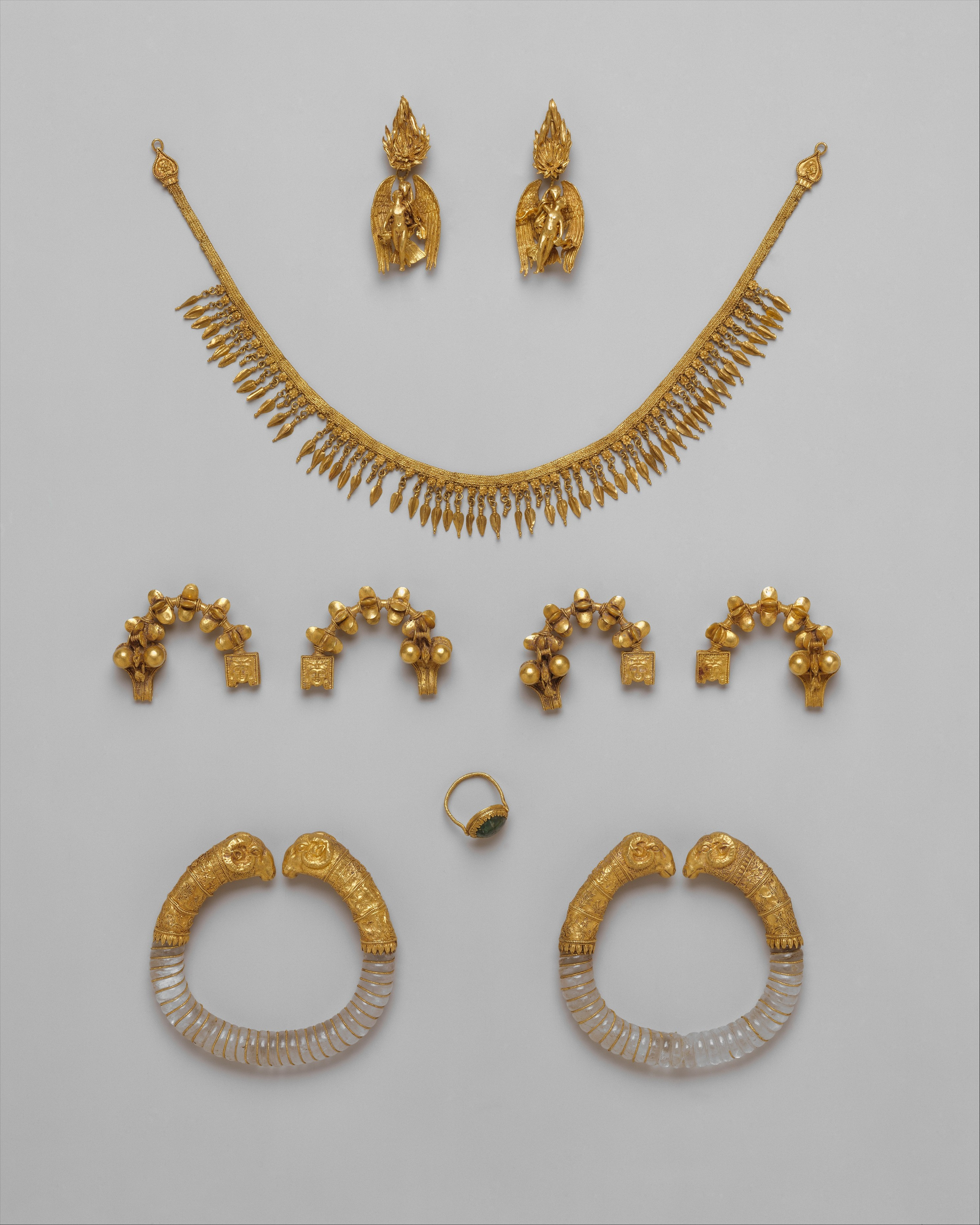
The Ganymede Jewellery; circa 300 BC; gold; various dimensions; provenance unknown (said to have been found near Thessaloniki, Greece); Metropolitan Museum of Art

Necklace; circa 200 BC; gold, moonstone, garnet, emerald, cornelian, baroque pearl and banded agate; overall: 39.4 centimetres (15.5 in); Cleveland Museum of Art (Cleveland)

==== Etruscan ====
Gorgons, pomegranates, acorns, lotus flowers and palms were a clear indicator of Greek influence in Etruscan jewellery. The modelling of heads, which was a typical practice from the Greek severe period, was a technique that spread throughout the Etruscan territory. An even clearer evidence of new influences is the shape introduced in the Orientalising era: The Bullae. A pear-shaped vessel used to hold perfume. Its surface was usually decorated with repoussé and engraved symbolic figures.

Much of the jewellery found was not worn by Etruscans, but were made to accompany them in the after world. Most, if not all, techniques of Etruscan goldsmiths were not invented by them as they are dated to the third millennium BC.

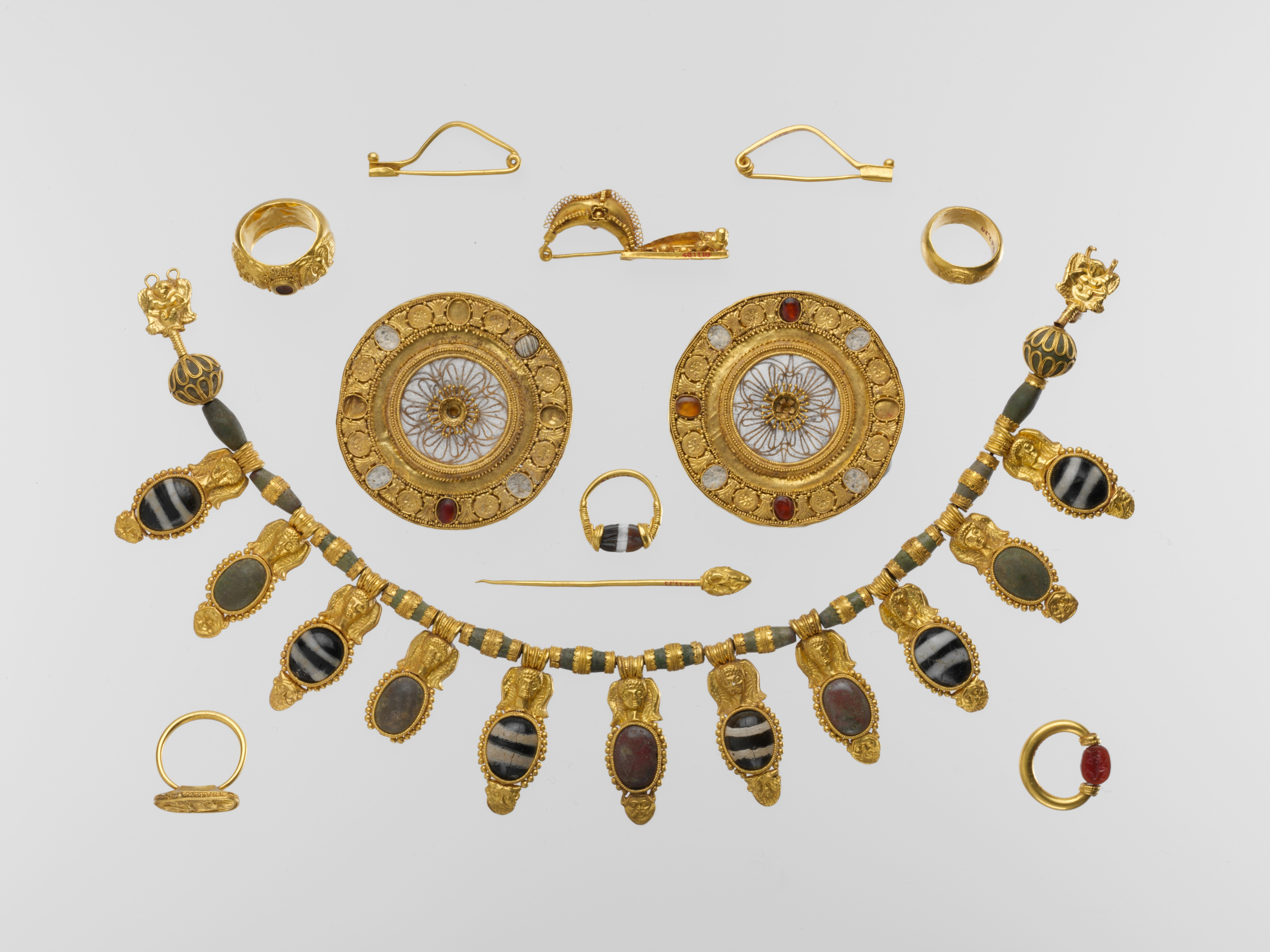
The Vulci set of jewellery; early 5th century; gold, glass, rock crystal, agate and carnelian; various dimensions; Metropolitan Museum of Art (New York City)

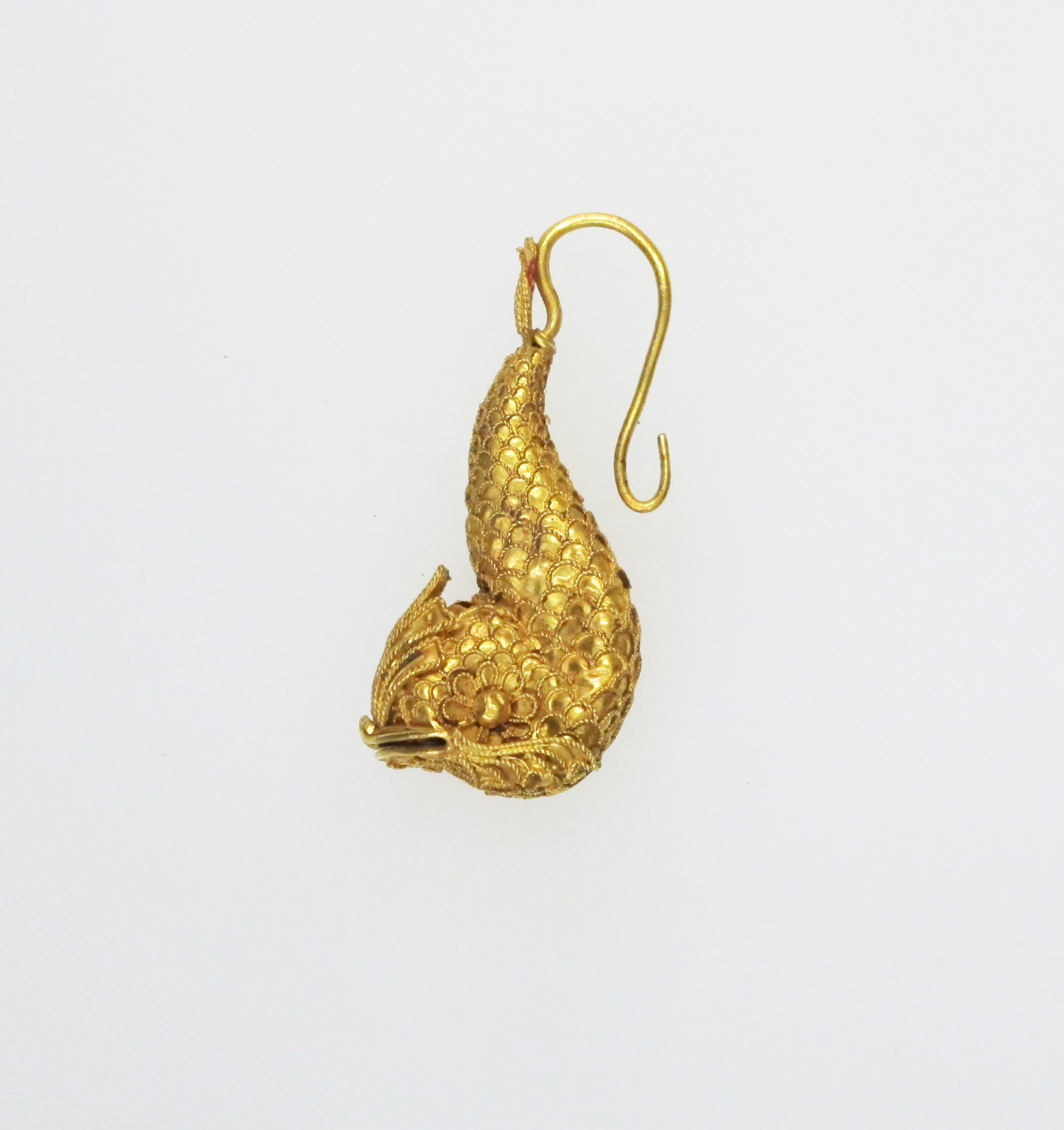
Earring in the form of a dolphin; 5th century BC; gold; 2.1 by 1.4 by 4.9 centimetres (0.83 in × 0.55 in × 1.93 in); Metropolitan Museum of Art

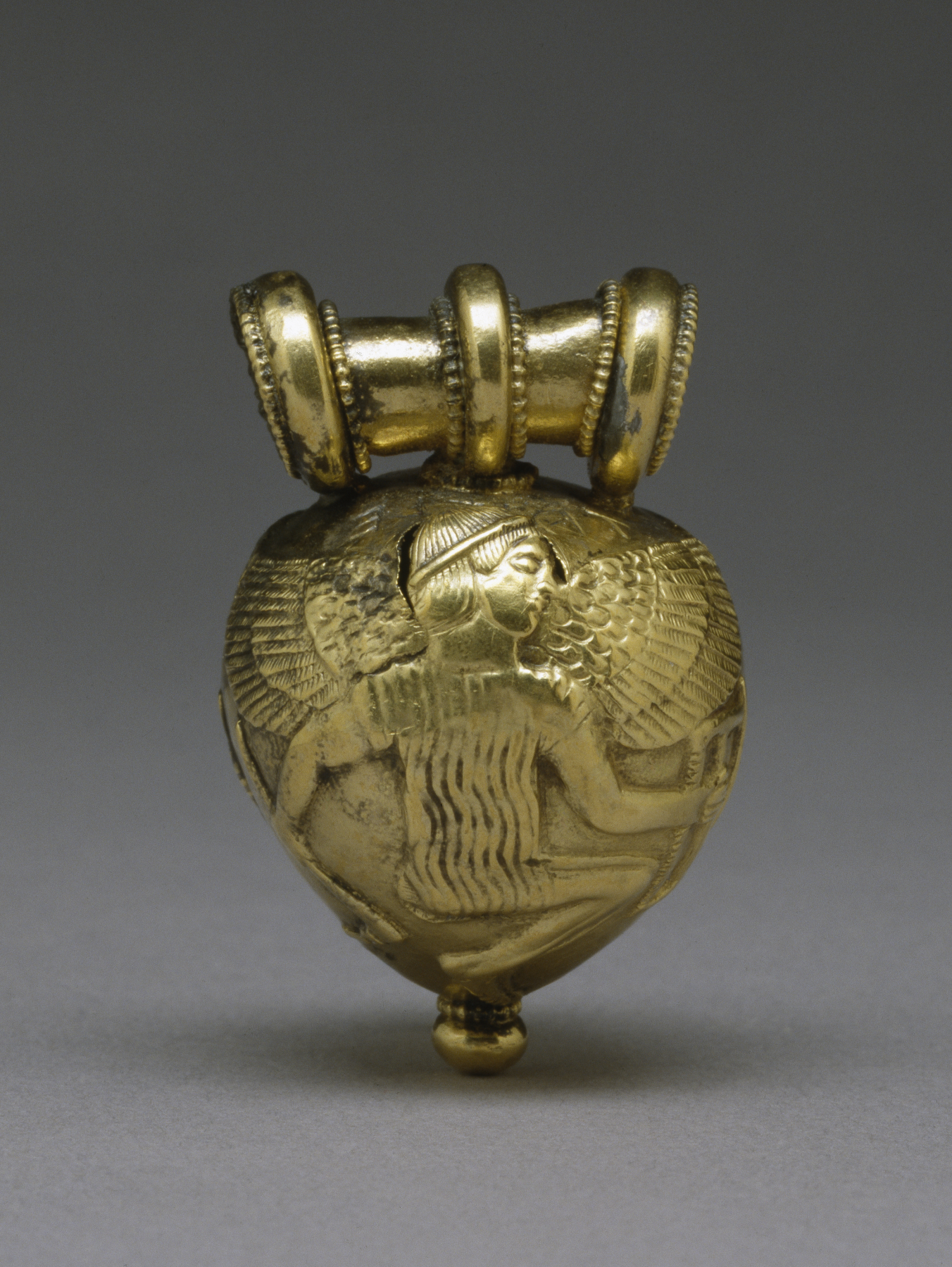
Bulla with Daedalus and Icarus; 5th century BC; gold; 1.6 by 1 by 1 centimetre (0.63 in × 0.39 in × 0.39 in); Walters Art Museum (Baltimore)

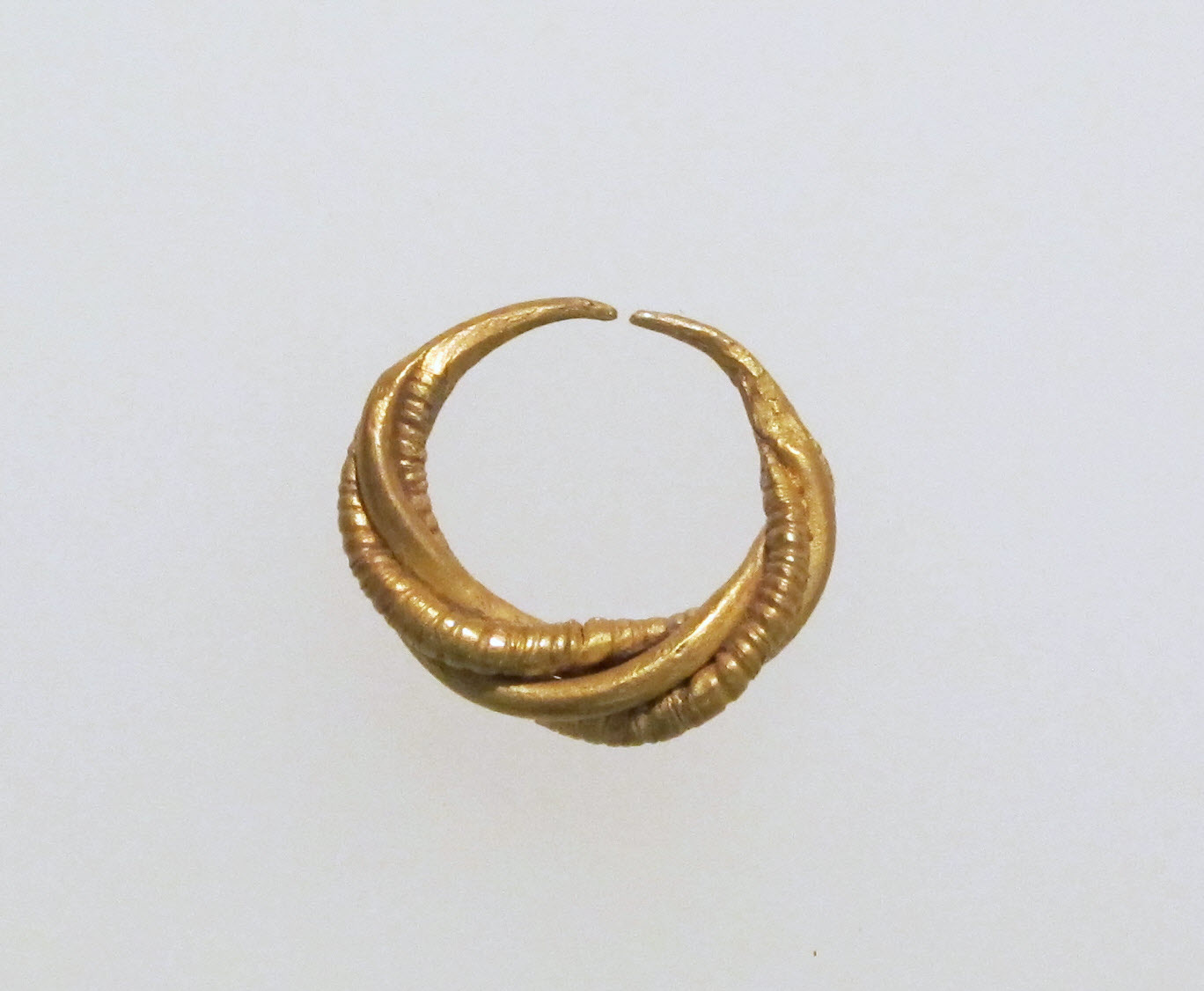
Earring; gold and silver; 1.5 by 0.4 by 1.4 centimetres (0.59 in × 0.16 in × 0.55 in); Metropolitan Museum of Art

==== Rome ====
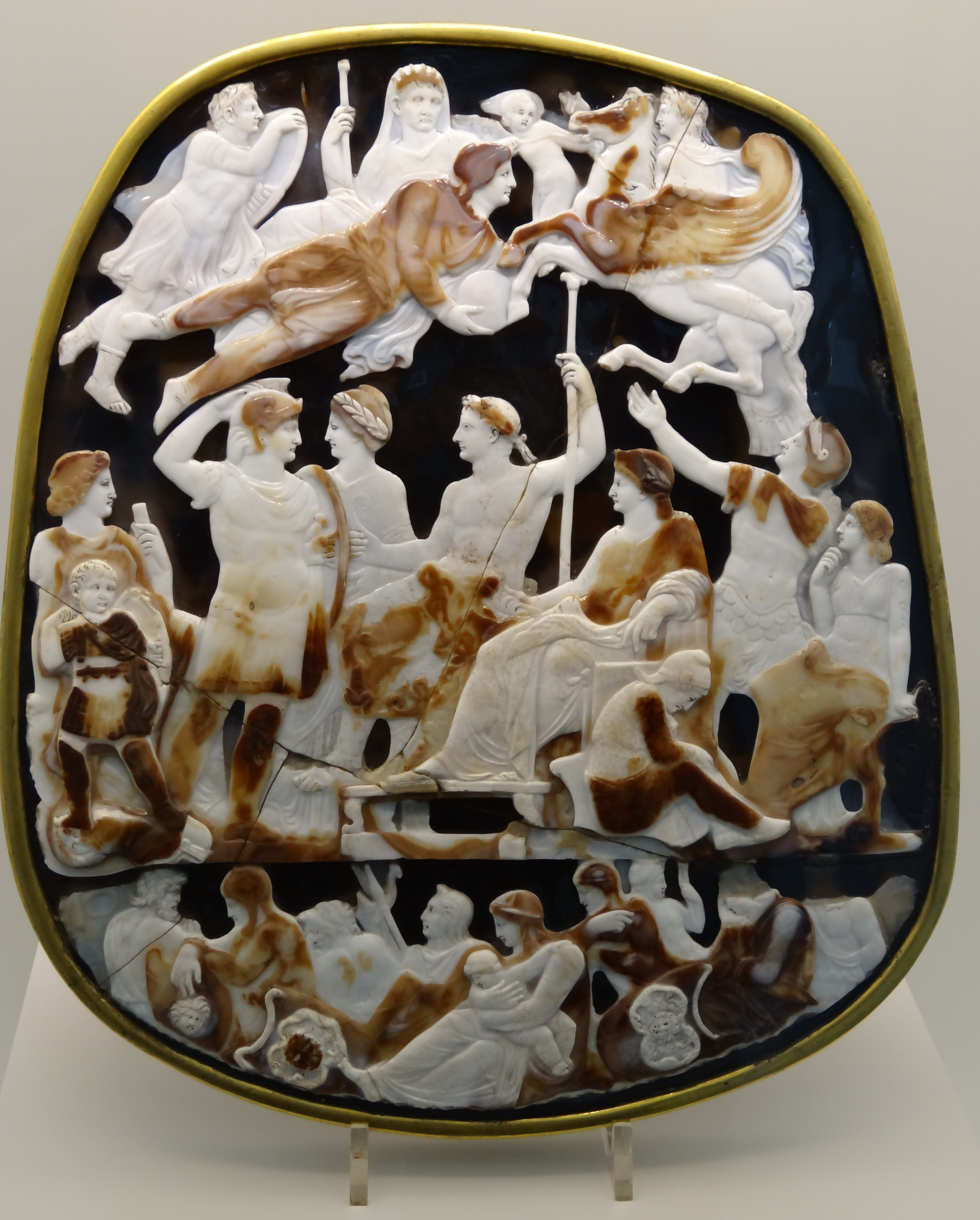
The Great Cameo of France; second quarter of the 1st century AD; five-layered sardonyx; 31 by 26.5 centimetres (12.2 in × 10.4 in); Cabinet des médailles (Paris)

Although jewellery work was abundantly diverse in earlier times, especially among the tribes such as the Celts, when the Romans conquered most of Europe, jewellery was changed as smaller factions developed the Roman designs. The most common artefact of early Rome was the brooch, which was used to secure clothing together. The Romans used a diverse range of materials for their jewellery from their extensive resources across the continent. Although they used gold, they sometimes used bronze or bone, and in earlier times, glass beads and pearl. As early as 2,000 years ago, they imported Sri Lankan sapphires and Indian diamonds and used emeralds and amber in their jewellery. In Roman-ruled England, fossilised wood called jet from Northern England was often carved into pieces of jewellery. The early Italians worked in crude gold and created clasps, necklaces, earrings, and bracelets. They also produced larger pendants that could be filled with perfume.

Like the Greeks, often the purpose of Roman jewellery was to ward off the "evil eye" given by other people. Although women wore a vast array of jewellery, men often only wore a finger ring. Although they were expected to wear at least one ring, some Roman men wore a ring on every finger, while others wore none. Roman men and women wore rings with an engraved gem on it that was used with wax to seal documents, a practice that continued into medieval times when kings and noblemen used the same method. After the fall of the Roman Empire, the jewellery designs were absorbed by neighbouring countries and tribes.

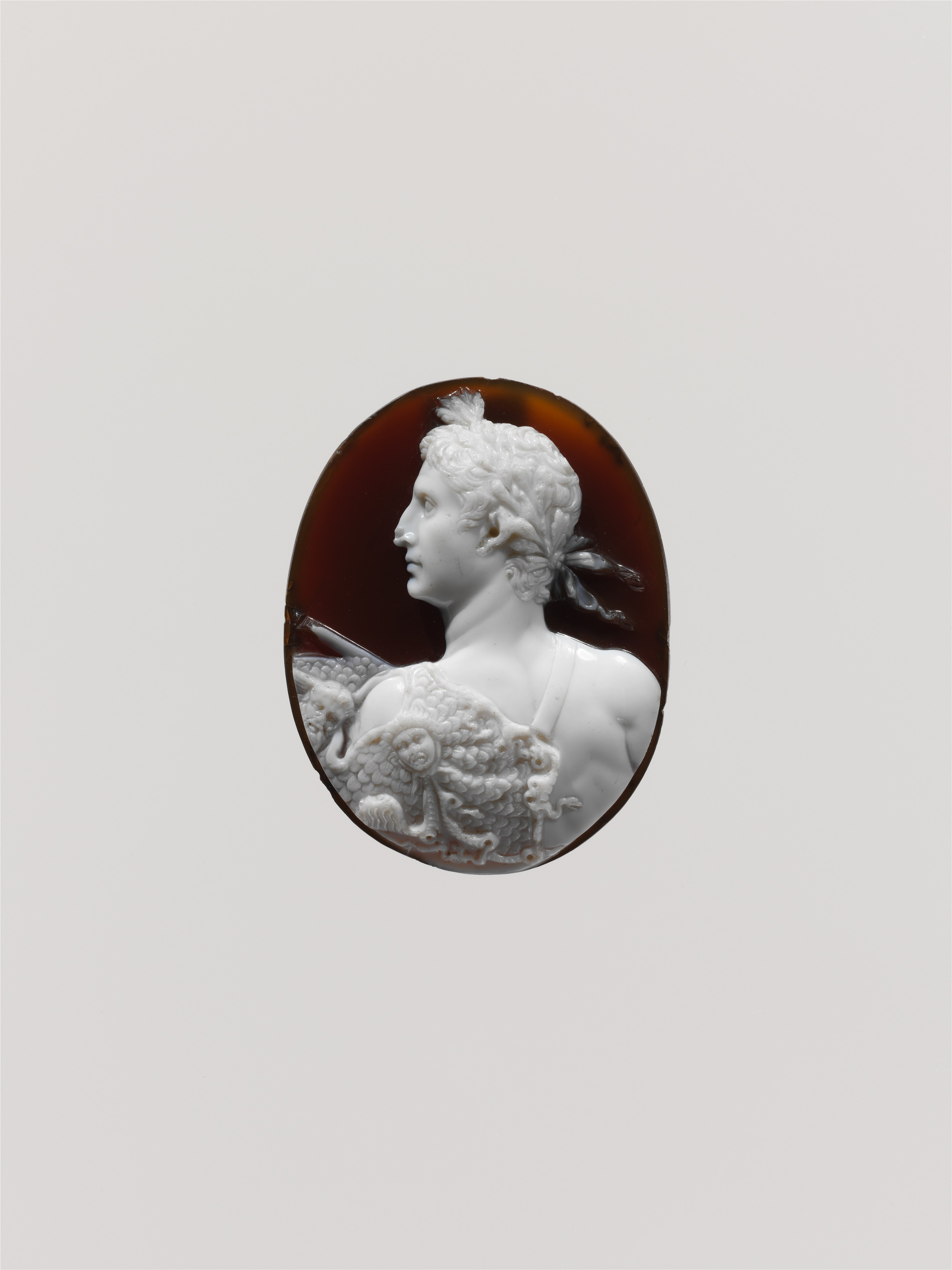
Cameo portrait of the Emperor Augustus; 41–54 AD; sardonyx; 3.7 by 2.9 by 0.8 centimetres (1.46 in × 1.14 in × 0.31 in); Metropolitan Museum of Art (New York City)

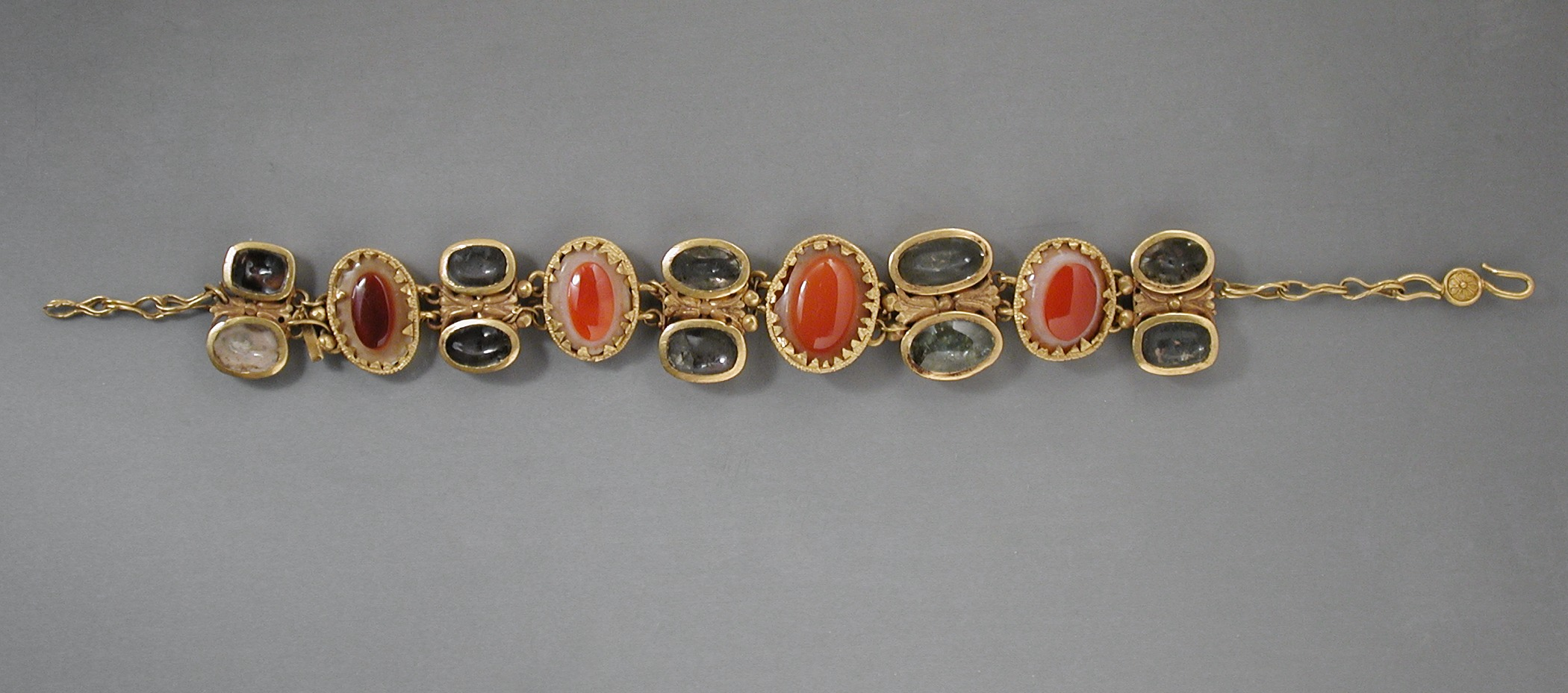
Bracelet; 1st–2nd century AD; gold-mounted crystal and sardonyx; length: 19.69 centimetres (7.75 in); Los Angeles County Museum of Art (Los Angeles)

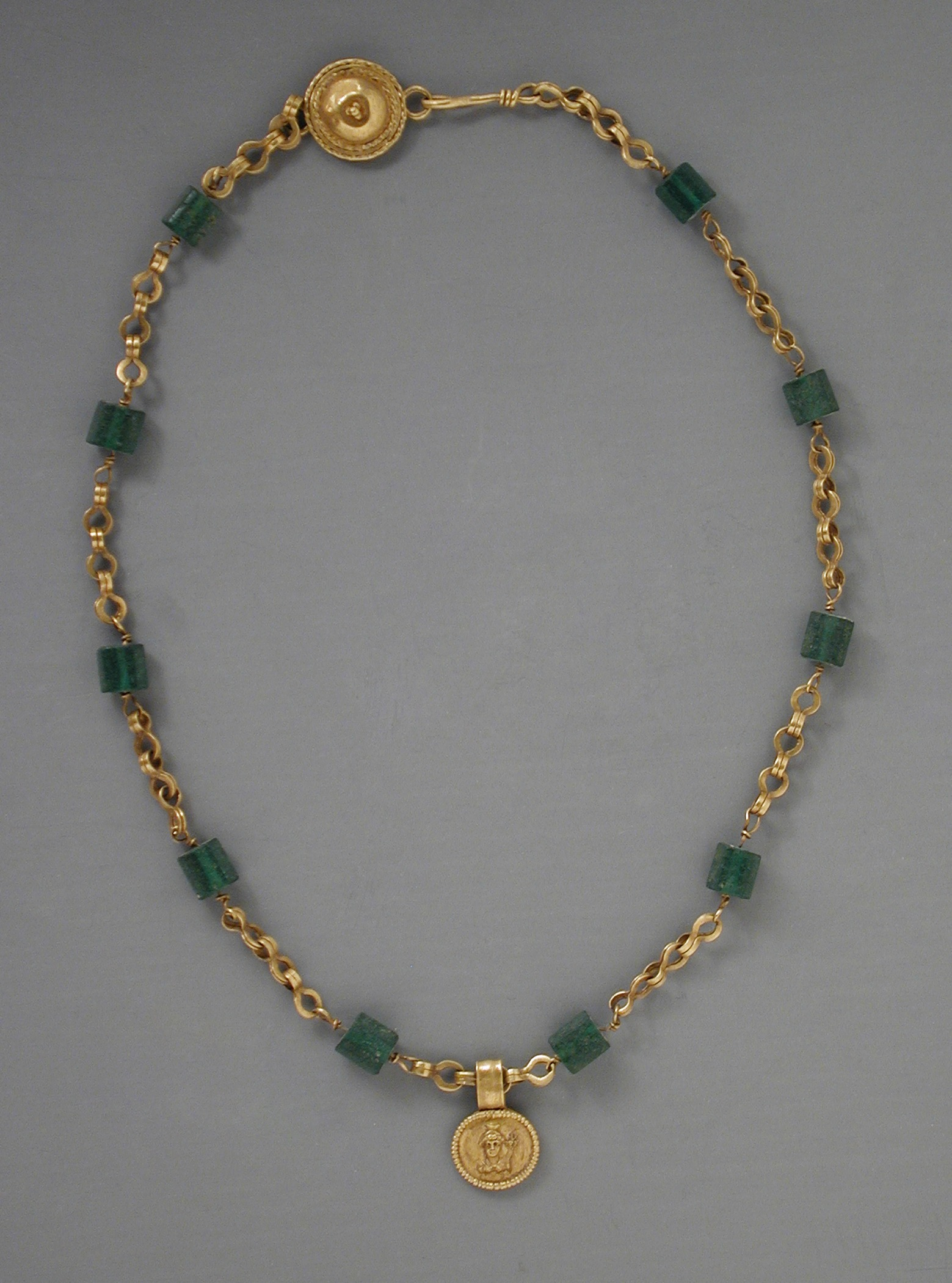
Necklace with a medallion depicting a goddess; 30–300 AD; green glass (the green beads) and gold; length: 43.82 centimetres (17.25 in); Los Angeles County Museum of Art

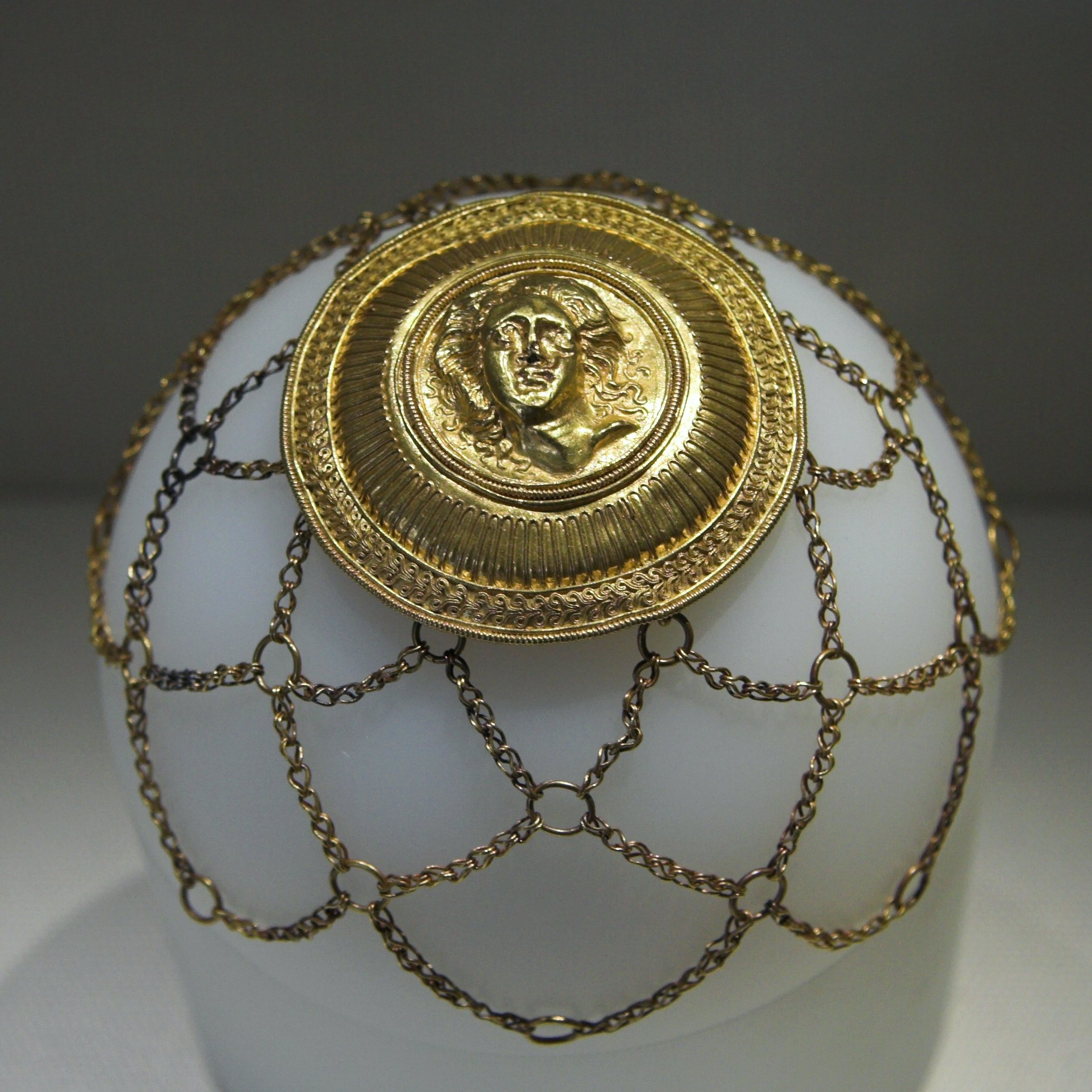
Openwork hairnet with the head of Medusa; 200–300 AD; gold; Archaeological Museum of Agrigento (Agrigento, Italy)

==== Middle Ages ====
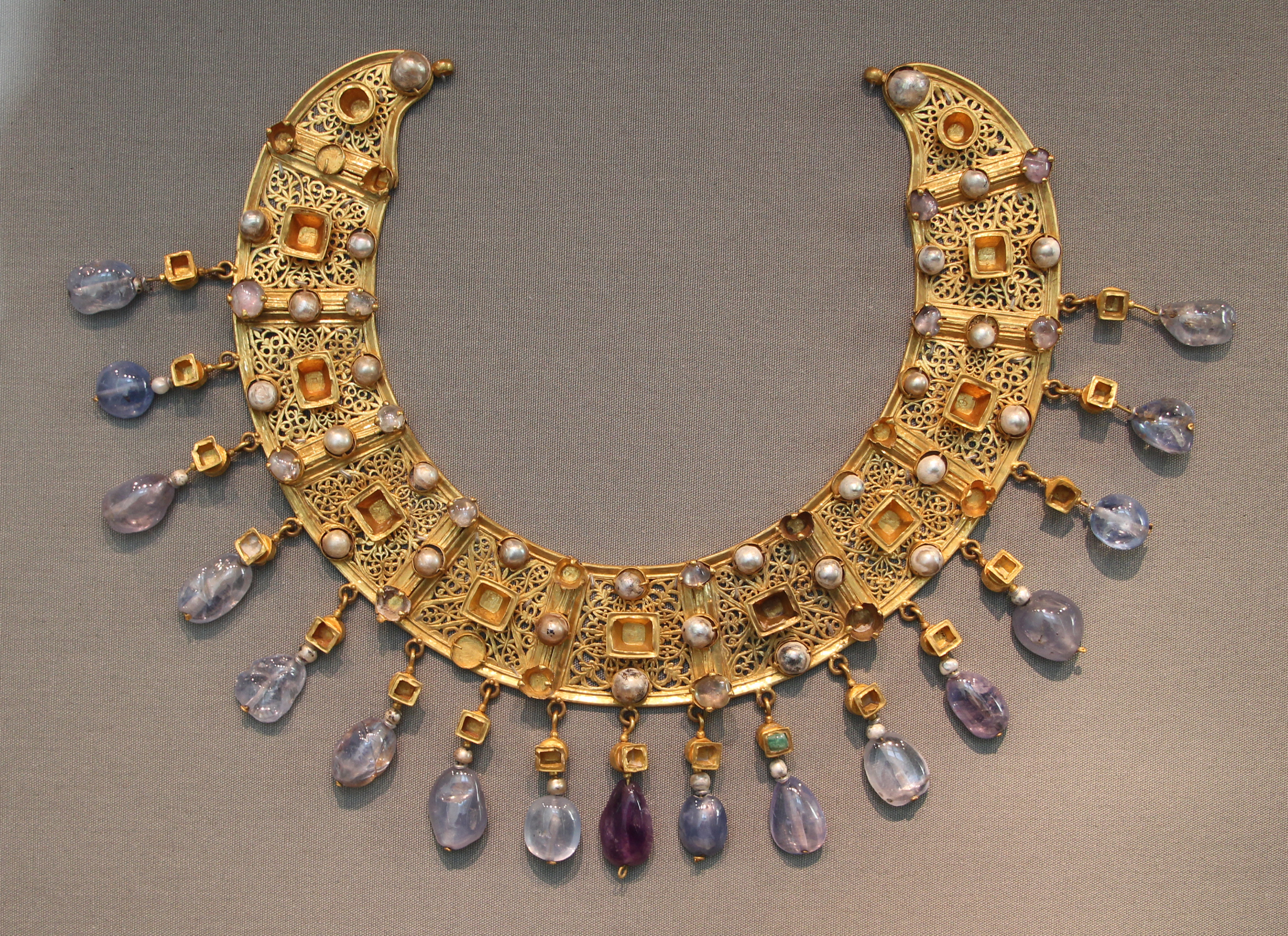
Byzantine collier; late 6th–7th century; gold, emeralds, sapphires, amethysts and pearls; diameter: 23 centimetres (9.1 in); from a Constantinopolitan workshop; Antikensammlung Berlin (Berlin, Germany)

Post-Roman Europe continued to develop jewellery making skills. The Celts and Merovingians in particular are noted for their jewellery, which in terms of quality matched or exceeded that of the Byzantine Empire. Clothing fasteners, amulets, and, to a lesser extent, signet rings, are the most common artefacts known to us. A particularly striking Celtic example is the Tara Brooch. The Torc was common throughout Europe as a symbol of status and power. By the 8th century, jewelled weaponry was common for men, while other jewellery (with the exception of signet rings) seemed to become the domain of women. Grave goods found in a 6th–7th century burial near Chalon-sur-Saône are illustrative. A young girl was buried with: 2 silver fibulae, a necklace (with coins), bracelet, gold earrings, a pair of hair-pins, comb, and buckle. The Celts specialised in continuous patterns and designs, while Merovingian designs are best known for stylised animal figures. They were not the only groups known for high quality work. Note the Visigoth work shown here, and the numerous decorative objects found at the Anglo-Saxon Ship burial at Sutton Hoo Suffolk, England are a particularly well-known example. On the continent, cloisonné and garnet were perhaps the quintessential method and gemstone of the period. In the 15th century, characteristic English jewellery types, such as golden signets and niello rings, became prominent. These pieces were often adorned with tiny figures of saints and intricate floral patterns, rivaling continental designs in craftsmanship.

The Eastern successor of the Roman Empire, the Byzantine Empire, continued many of the methods of the Romans, though religious themes came to predominate. Unlike the Romans, the Franks, and the Celts, however, Byzantium used light-weight gold leaf rather than solid gold, and more emphasis was placed on stones and gems. As in the West, Byzantine jewellery was worn by wealthier females, with male jewellery apparently restricted to signet rings. Woman's jewellery had some peculiarities like kolts that decorated headband. Like other contemporary cultures, jewellery was commonly buried with its owner.

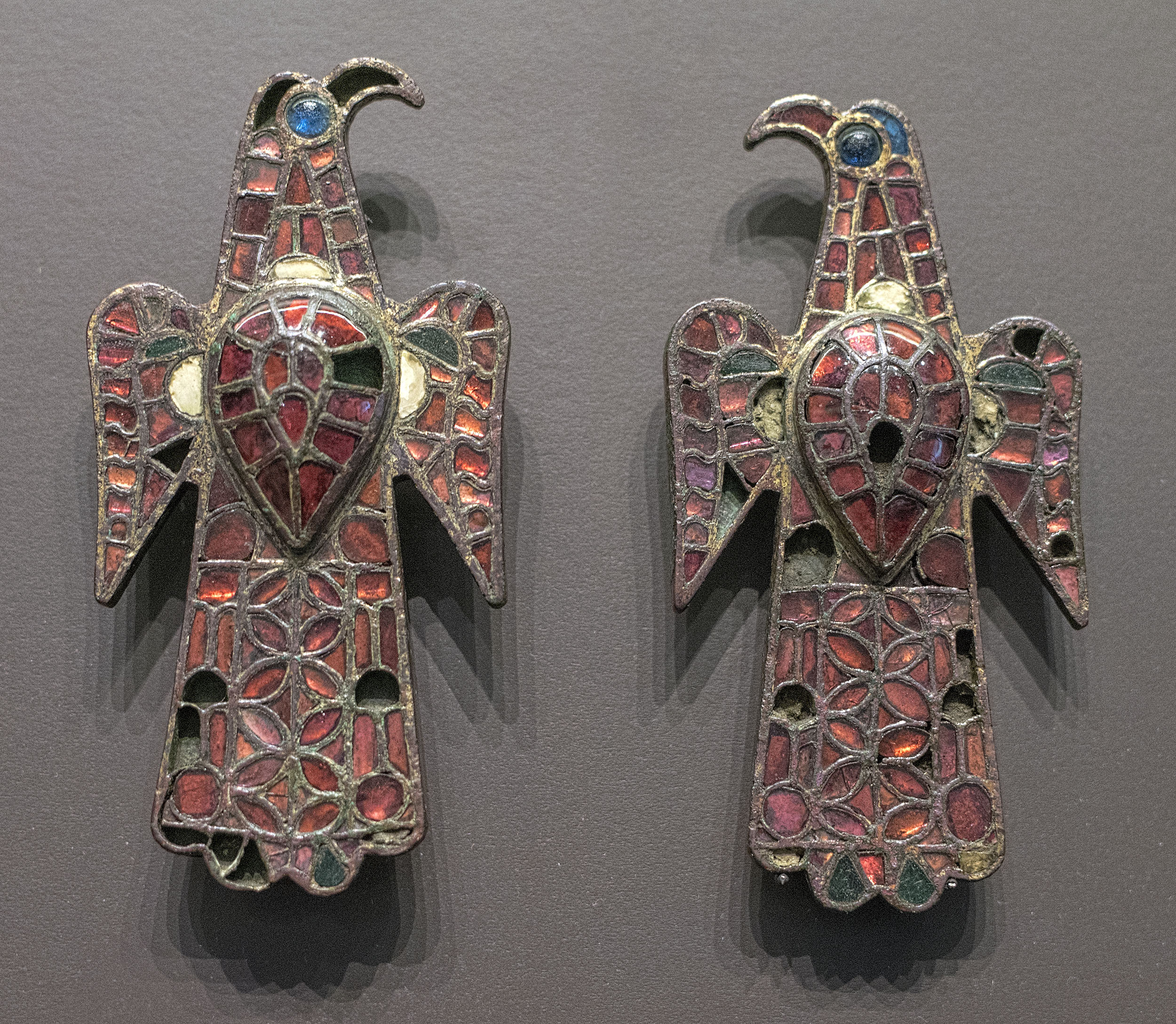
The Eagle-shaped fibulae of Alovera; 5th century; gold, bronze and glass (imitation of garnet); height: 11.8 centimetres (4.6 in), width: 5.9 centimetres (2.3 in); from Guadalajara (Spain); National Archaeological Museum (Madrid, Spain)

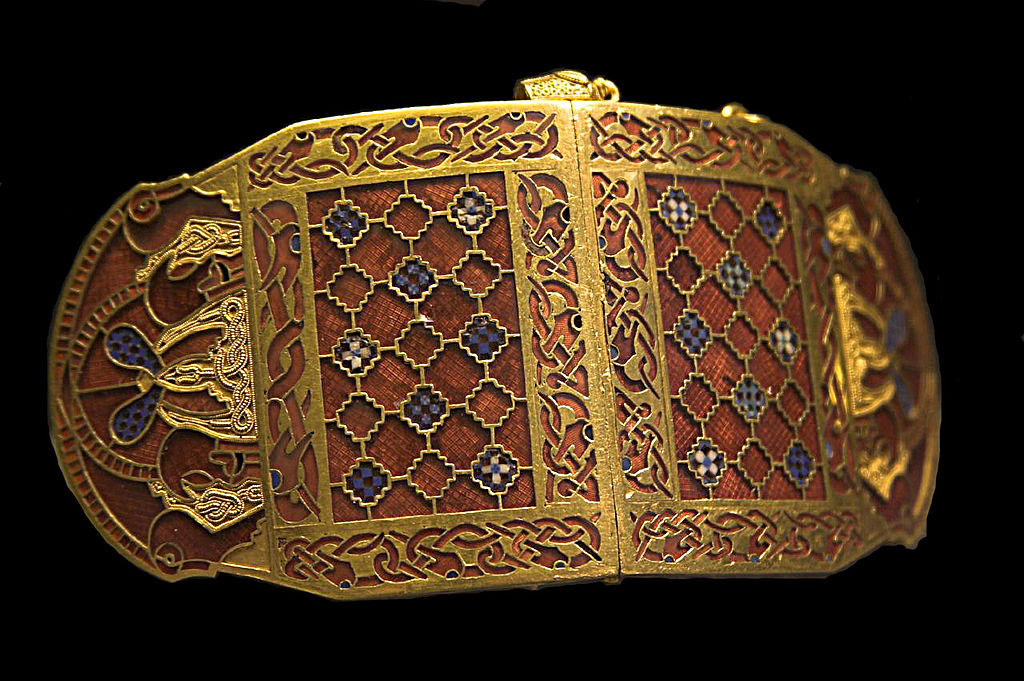
Shoulder-clasps from Sutton Hoo; early 7th century; gold, glass and garnet; length: 12.7 centimetres (5.0 in); British Museum (London)

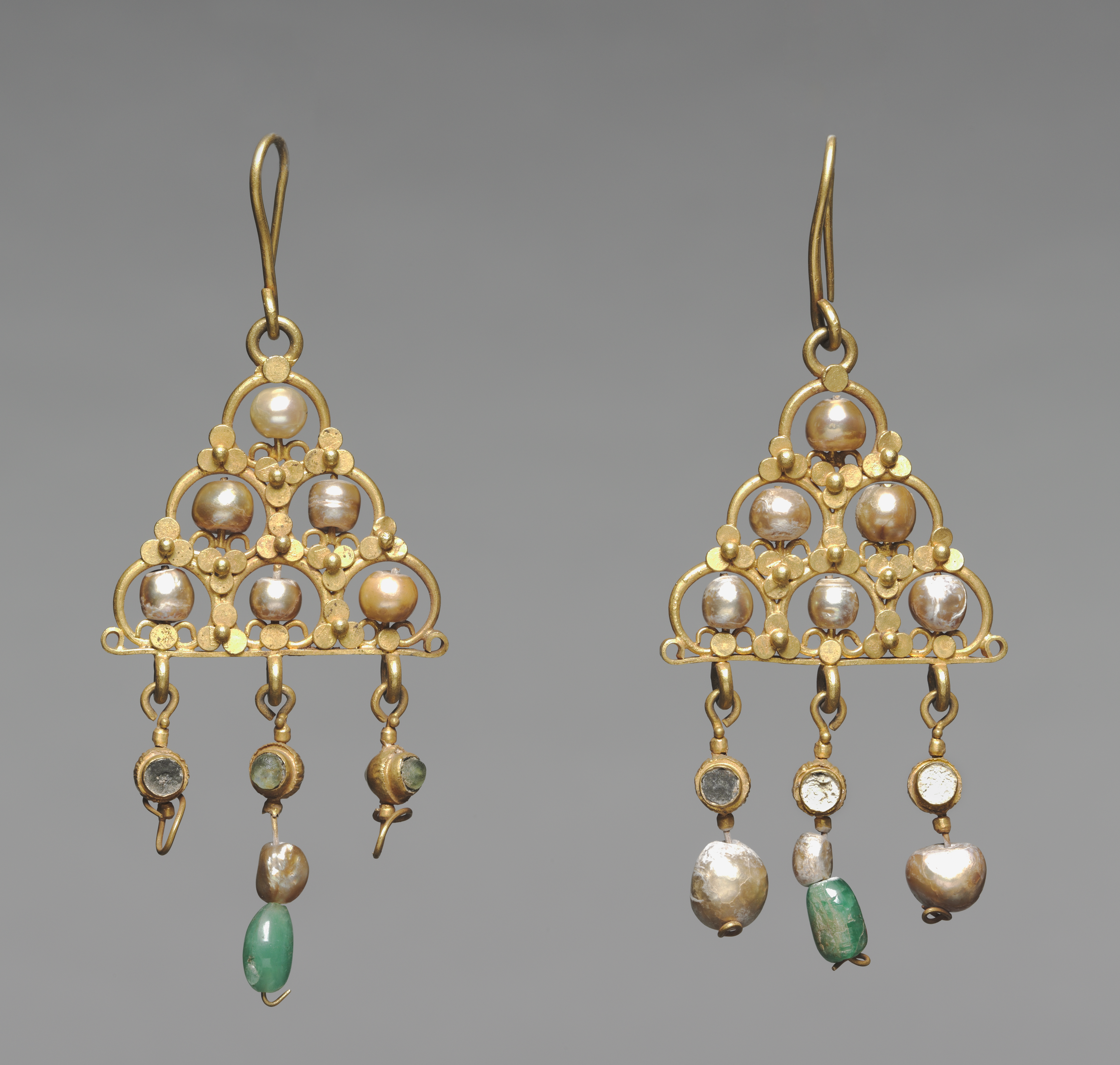
Pair of Byzantine earrings; 7th century; gold, pearls, glass and emeralds; 10.2 by 4.5 centimetres (4.0 in × 1.8 in); Cleveland Museum of Art (Cleveland)

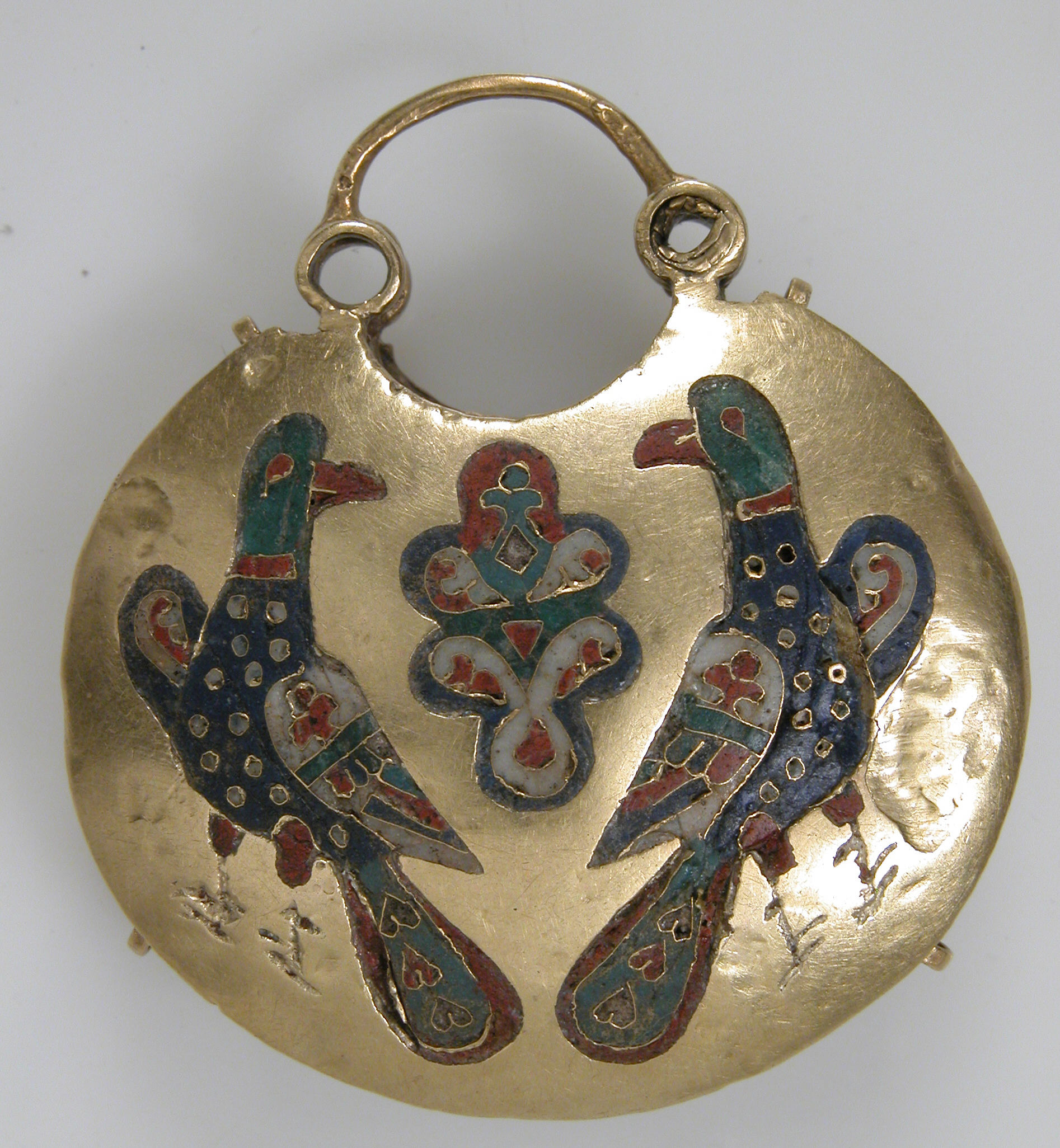
Front of a temple pendant with two birds flanking a tree of life; 11th–12th century; cloisonné enamel and gold; overall: 5.4 by 4.8 by 1.5 centimetres (2.13 in × 1.89 in × 0.59 in); made in Kyiv (Ukraine); Metropolitan Museum of Art (New York City)

==== Renaissance ====
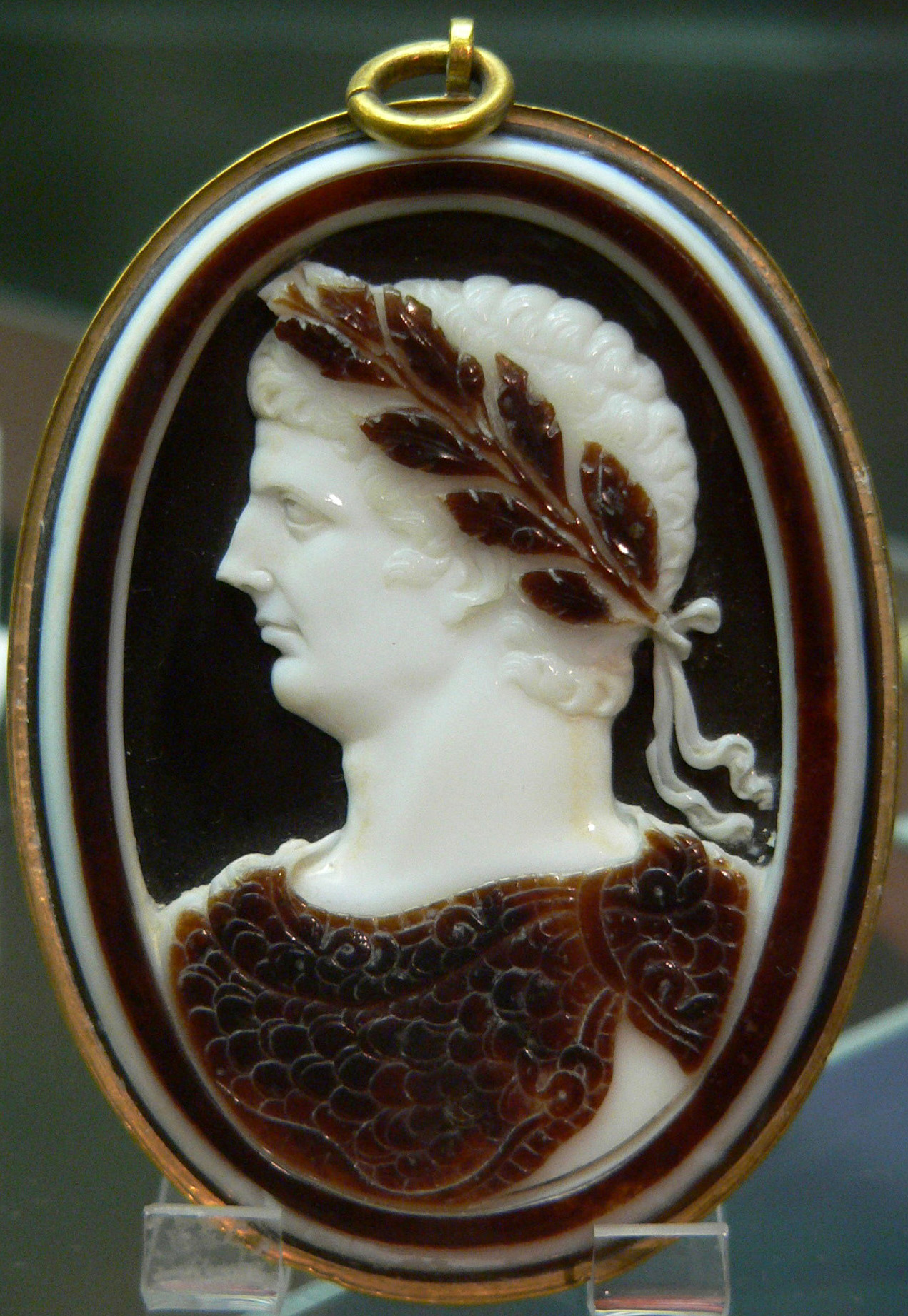
Cameo; 16th century; sardonyx; Cabinet des Médailles (Paris)

The Renaissance and exploration both had significant impacts on the development of jewellery in Europe. By the 17th century, increasing exploration and trade led to increased availability of a wide variety of gemstones as well as exposure to the art of other cultures. Whereas prior to this the working of gold and precious metal had been at the forefront of jewellery, this period saw increasing dominance of gemstones and their settings. An example of this is the Cheapside Hoard, the stock of a jeweller hidden in London during the Commonwealth period and not found again until 1912. It contained Colombian emerald, topaz, amazonite from Brazil, spinel, iolite, and chrysoberyl from Sri Lanka, ruby from India, Afghan lapis lazuli, Persian turquoise, Red Sea peridot, as well as Bohemian and Hungarian opal, garnet, and amethyst. Large stones were frequently set in box-bezels on enamelled rings. Notable among merchants of the period was Jean-Baptiste Tavernier, who brought the precursor stone of the Hope Diamond to France in the 1660s.

When Napoleon Bonaparte was crowned as Emperor of the French in 1804, he revived the style and grandeur of jewellery and fashion in France. Under Napoleon's rule, jewellers introduced parures, suites of matching jewellery, such as a diamond tiara, diamond earrings, diamond rings, a diamond brooch, and a diamond necklace. Both of Napoleon's wives had beautiful sets such as these and wore them regularly. Another fashion trend resurrected by Napoleon was the cameo. Soon after his cameo decorated crown was seen, cameos were highly sought. The period also saw the early stages of costume jewellery, with fish scale covered glass beads in place of pearls or conch shell cameos instead of stone cameos. New terms were coined to differentiate the arts: jewellers who worked in cheaper materials were called bijoutiers, while jewellers who worked with expensive materials were called joailliers, a practice which continues to this day.

==== Romanticism ====
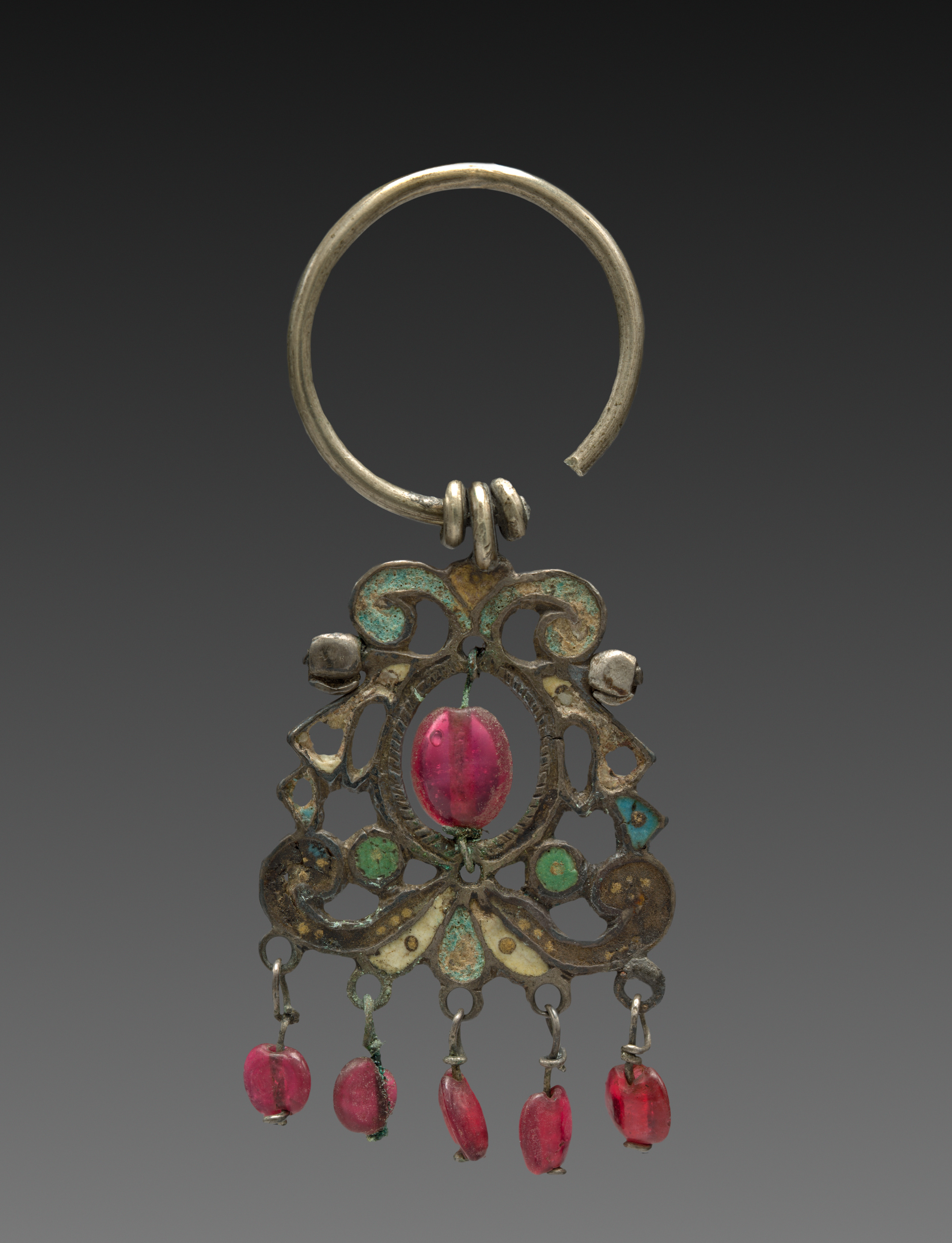
Russian earring; 19th century; silver, enamel and red glass beads; overall: 6.4 by 2.6 centimetres (2.5 in × 1.0 in); Cleveland Museum of Art (Cleveland)

Starting in the late 18th century, Romanticism had a profound impact on the development of western jewellery. Perhaps the most significant influences were the public's fascination with the treasures being discovered through the birth of modern archaeology and a fascination with Medieval and Renaissance art. Changing social conditions and the onset of the Industrial Revolution also led to growth of a middle class that wanted and could afford jewellery. As a result, the use of industrial processes, cheaper alloys, and stone substitutes led to the development of paste or costume jewellery. Distinguished goldsmiths continued to flourish, however, as wealthier patrons sought to ensure that what they wore still stood apart from the jewellery of the masses, not only through use of precious metals and stones but also though superior artistic and technical work. One such artist was the French goldsmith François-Désiré Froment-Meurice. A category unique to this period and quite appropriate to the philosophy of romanticism was mourning jewellery. It originated in England, where Queen Victoria was often seen wearing jet jewellery after the death of Prince Albert, and it allowed the wearer to continue wearing jewellery while expressing a state of mourning at the death of a loved one.

In the United States, this period saw the founding in 1837 of Tiffany & Co. by Charles Lewis Tiffany. Tiffany's put the United States on the world map in terms of jewellery and gained fame creating dazzling commissions for people such as the wife of Abraham Lincoln. Later, it would gain popular notoriety as the setting of the film Breakfast at Tiffany's. In France, Pierre Cartier founded Cartier SA in 1847, while 1884 saw the founding of Bulgari in Italy. The modern production studio had been born and was a step away from the former dominance of individual craftsmen and patronage.

This period also saw the first major collaboration between East and West. Collaboration in Pforzheim between German and Japanese artists led to Shakudō plaques set into Filigree frames being created by the Stoeffler firm in 1885. Perhaps the grand finalé – and an appropriate transition to the following period – were the masterful creations of the Russian artist Peter Carl Fabergé, working for the Imperial Russian court, whose Fabergé eggs and jewellery pieces are still considered as the epitome of the goldsmith's art.

==== 18th century/Romanticism/Renaissance ====
Many whimsical fashions were introduced in the extravagant eighteenth century. Cameos that were used in connection with jewellery were the attractive trinkets along with many of the small objects such as brooches, ear-rings and scarf-pins. Some of the necklets were made of several pieces joined with the gold chains were in and bracelets were also made sometimes to match the necklet and the brooch. At the end of the Century the jewellery with cut steel intermixed with large crystals was introduced by an Englishman, Matthew Boulton of Birmingham.

==== Art Nouveau ====
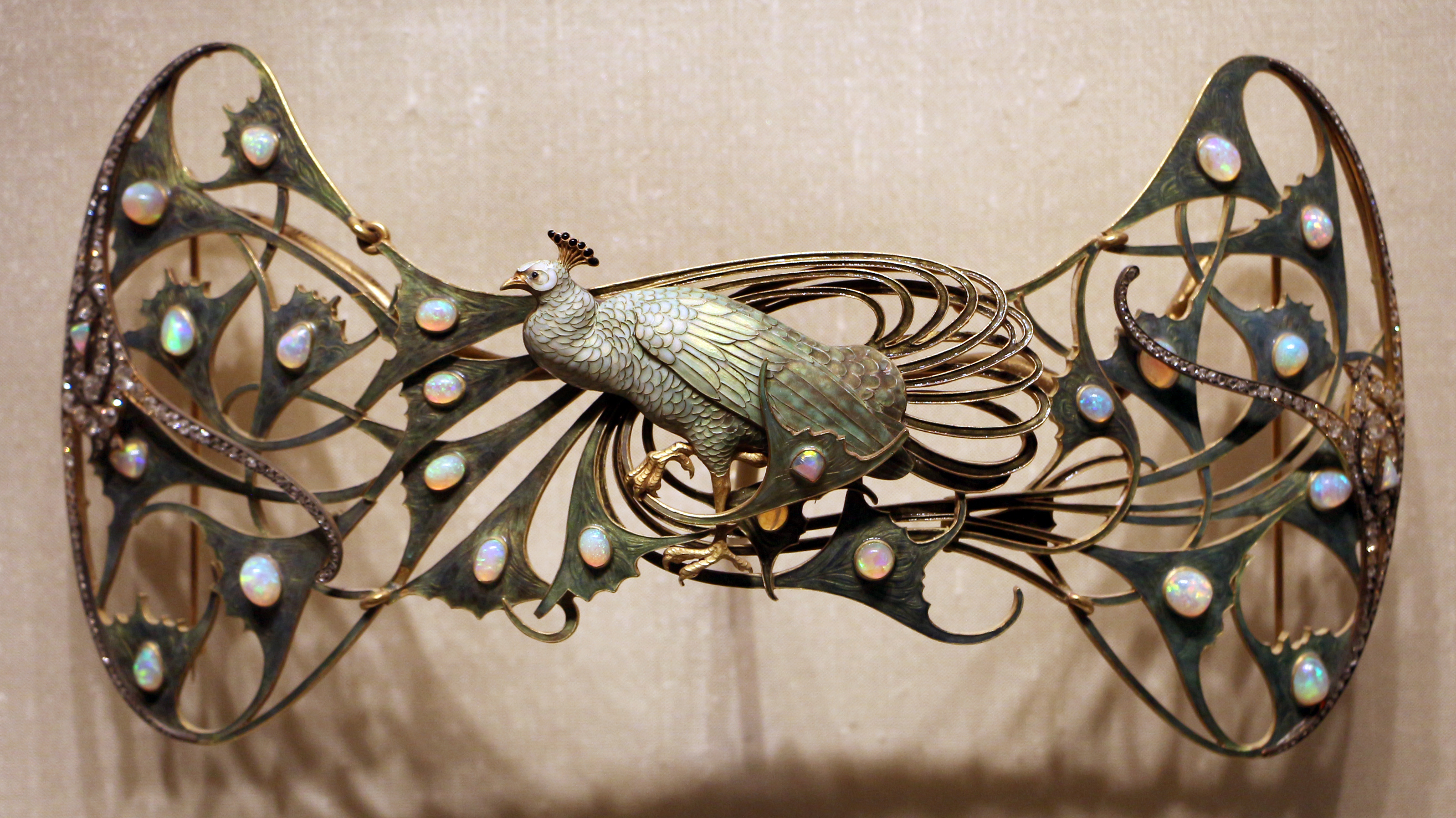
Breastplate with a peacocks; René Lalique; c. 1898–1900; gold, enamels, opals and diamonds; Calouste Gulbenkian Museum (Lisbon, Portugal)

In the 1890s, jewellers began to explore the potential of the growing Art Nouveau style and the closely related German Jugendstil, British (and to some extent American) Arts and Crafts Movement, Catalan Modernisme, Austro-Hungarian Sezession, Italian "Liberty", etc.

Art Nouveau jewellery encompassed many distinct features including a focus on the female form and an emphasis on colour, most commonly rendered through the use of enamelling techniques including basse-taille, champleve, cloisonné, and plique-à-jour. Motifs included orchids, irises, pansies, vines, swans, peacocks, snakes, dragonflies, mythological creatures, and the female silhouette.

René Lalique, working for the Paris shop of Samuel Bing, was recognised by contemporaries as a leading figure in this trend. The Darmstadt Artists' Colony and Wiener Werkstätte provided perhaps the most significant input to the trend, while in Denmark Georg Jensen, though best known for his Silverware, also contributed significant pieces. In England, Liberty & Co., (notably through the Cymric designs of Archibald Knox) and the British arts and crafts movement of Charles Robert Ashbee contributed slightly more linear but still characteristic designs. The new style moved the focus of the jeweller's art from the setting of stones to the artistic design of the piece itself. Lalique's dragonfly design is one of the best examples of this. Enamels played a large role in technique, while sinuous organic lines are the most recognisable design feature.

The end of World War I once again changed public attitudes, and a more sober style developed.

The Dragonfly brooch; by René Lalique; c. 1897–1898; gold, vitreous enamel, chrysoprase, chalcedony, moonstone and diamond; height: 23 centimetres (9.1 in), width: 26.5 centimetres (10.4 in); Calouste Gulbenkian Museum (Lisbon, Portugal)

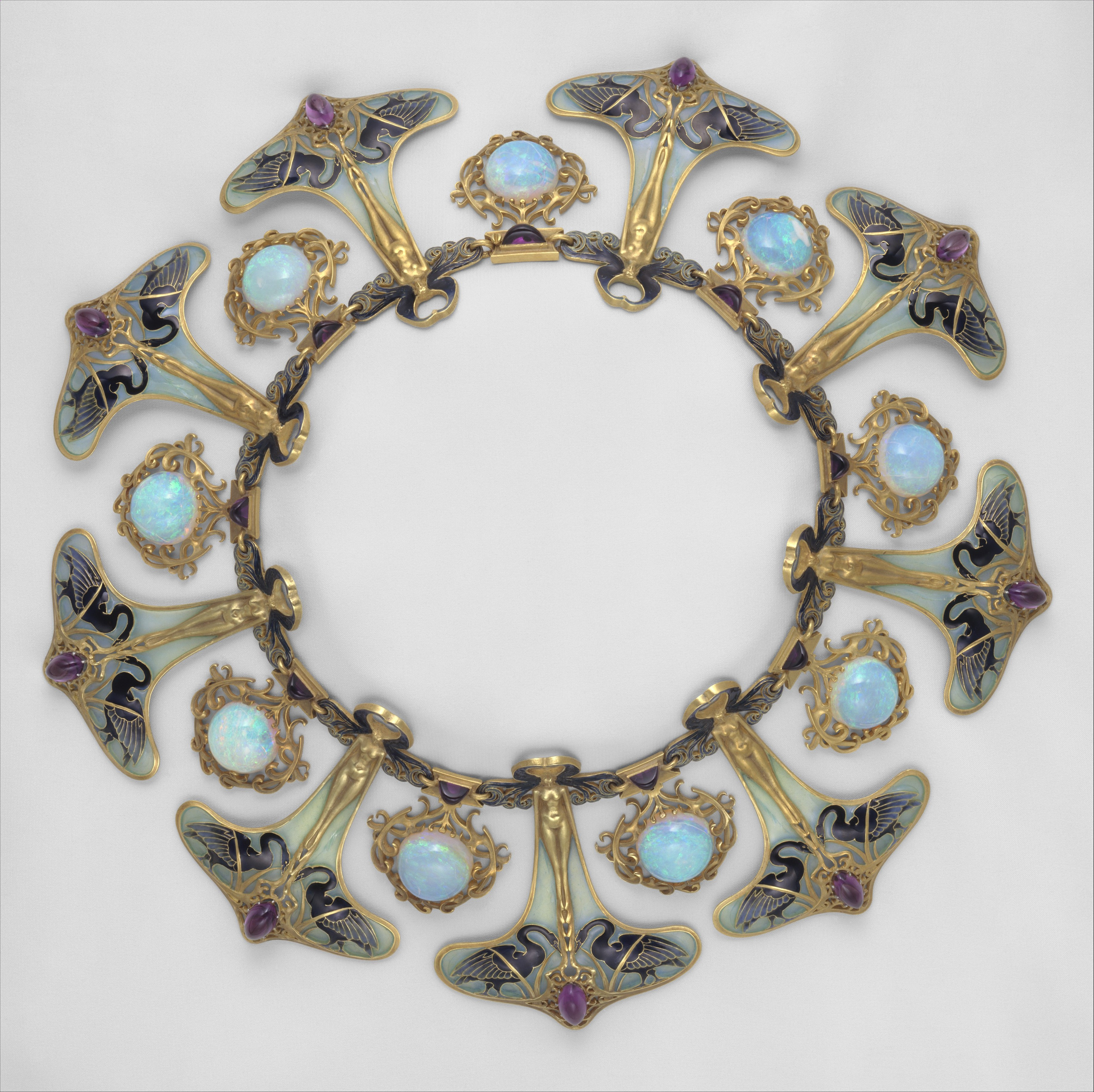
Necklace; by René Lalique; 1897–1899; gold, enamel, opals and amethysts; overall diameter: 24.1 centimetres (9.5 in); Metropolitan Museum of Art (New York City)

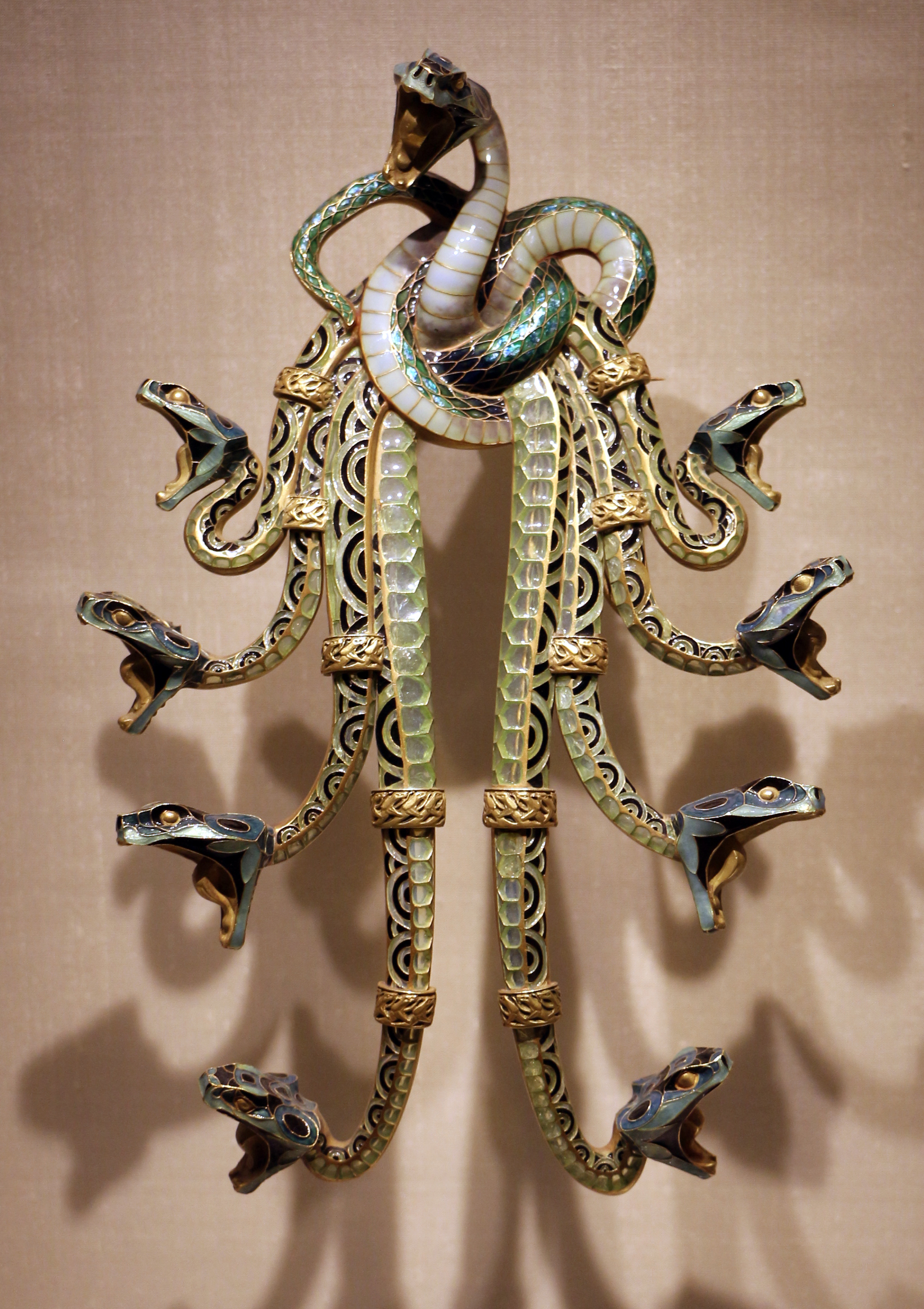
The Snakes brooch; by René Lalique; gold and enamel; Calouste Gulbenkian Museum

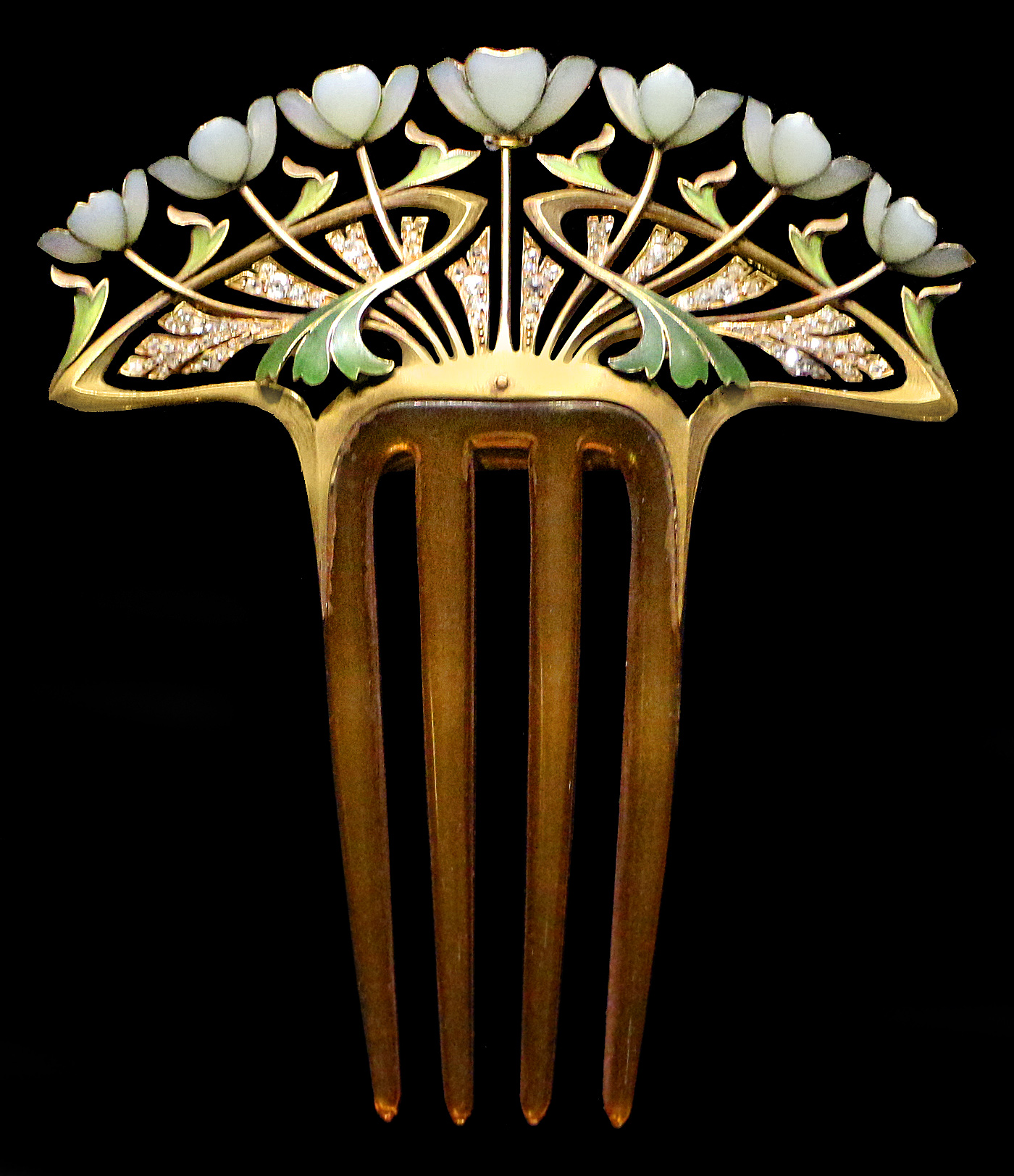
Hair ornament, an Art Nouveau masterpiece; by René Lalique; c. 1902; gold, emeralds and diamonds; Musée d'Orsay (Paris)

==== Art Deco ====
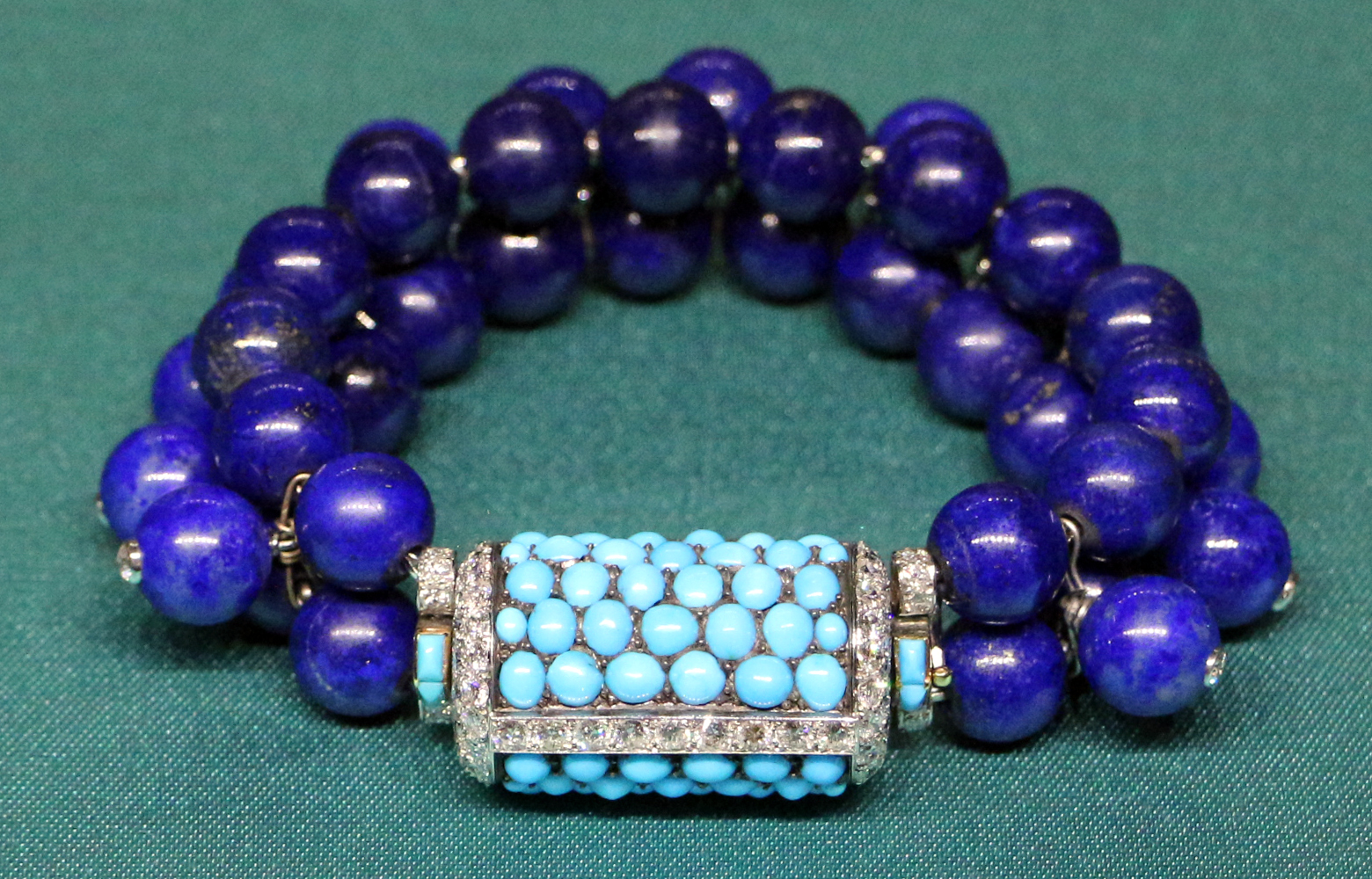
Bracelet in platinum, white gold, silver, diamonds, lapislazuli, turquoise, by Cartier Paris, 1937

Growing political tensions, the after-effects of the war, and a reaction against the perceived decadence of the turn of the 20th century led to simpler forms, combined with more effective manufacturing for mass production of high-quality jewellery. Covering the period of the 1920s and 1930s, the style has become popularly known as Art Deco. Walter Gropius and the German Bauhaus movement, with their philosophy of "no barriers between artists and craftsmen" led to some interesting and stylistically simplified forms. Modern materials were also introduced: plastics and aluminium were first used in jewellery, and of note are the chromed pendants of Russian-born Bauhaus master Naum Slutzky. Technical mastery became as valued as the material itself. In the West, this period saw the reinvention of granulation by the German Elizabeth Treskow, although development of the re-invention has continued into the 1990s. It is based on the basic shapes.

=== Asia ===
In Asia, the Indian subcontinent has the longest continuous legacy of jewellery making anywhere, Asia was the first place where these jewellery were made in large numbers for the royals with a history of over 5,000 years. One of the first to start jewellery making were the peoples of the Indus Valley civilisation, in what is now predominately modern-day Pakistan and part of northern and western India. Early jewellery making in China started around the same period, but it became widespread with the spread of Buddhism around 2,000 years ago.

==== China ====
The Chinese used silver in their jewellery more than gold. Blue kingfisher feathers were tied onto early Chinese jewellery and later, blue gems and glass were incorporated into designs. However, jade was preferred over any other stone. The Chinese revered jade because of the human-like qualities they assigned to it, such as its hardness, durability, and beauty. The first jade pieces were very simple, but as time progressed, more complex designs evolved. Jade rings from between the 4th and 7th centuries BC show evidence of having been worked with a compound milling machine, hundreds of years before the first mention of such equipment in the west.

In China, the most uncommon piece of jewellery is the earring, which was worn neither by men nor women. In modern times, earrings are still considered culturally taboo for men in China—in fact, in 2019, the Chinese video streaming service iQiyi began blurring the ears of male actors wearing earrings. Amulets were common, often with a Chinese symbol or dragon. Dragons, Chinese symbols, and phoenixes were frequently depicted on jewellery designs.

The Chinese often placed their jewellery in their graves. Most Chinese graves found by archaeologists contain decorative jewellery.

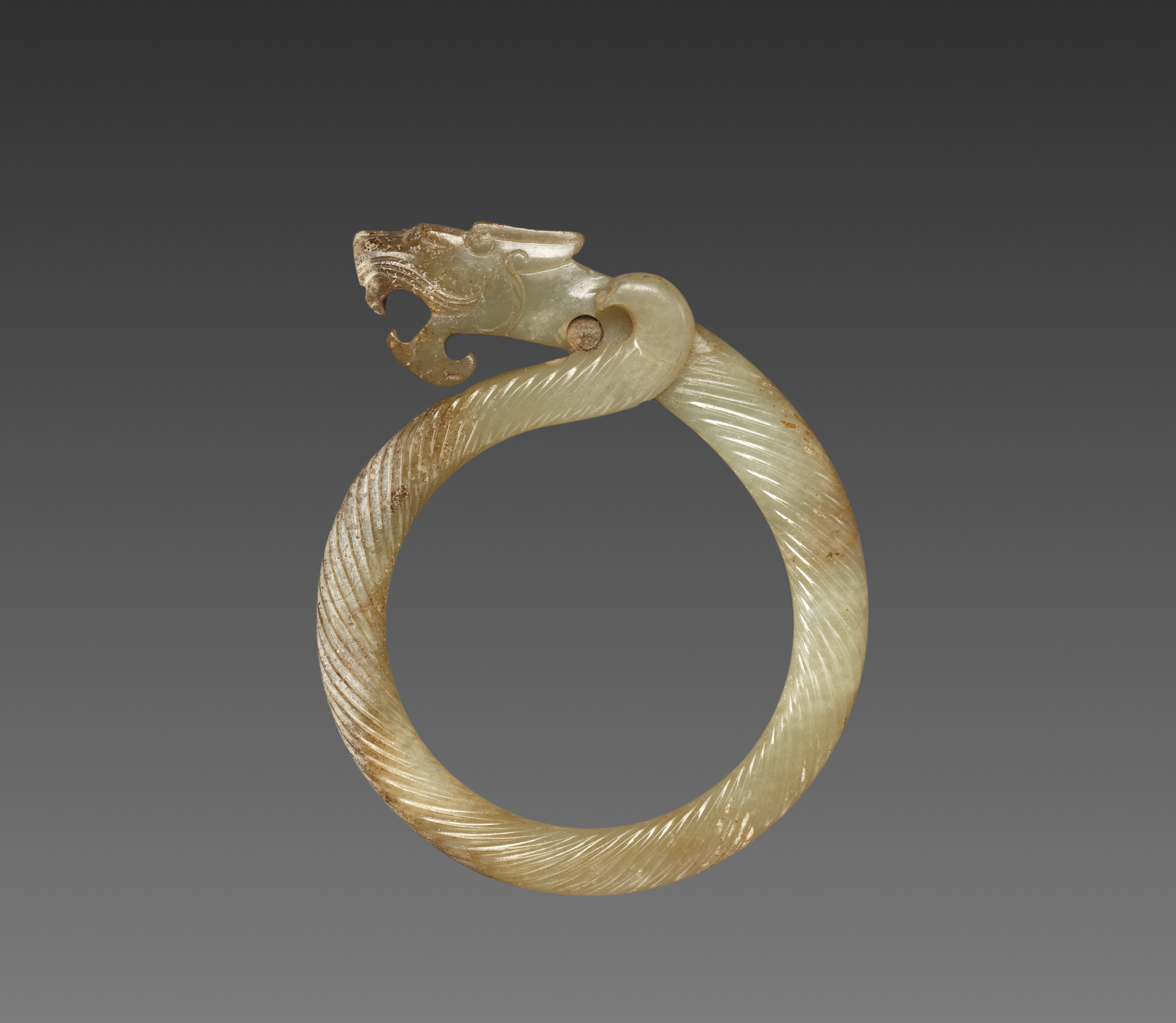
Fluted ring with a dragon head (huan); circa 475 BC; jade (nephrite); overall: 9.1 centimetres (3.6 in); Cleveland Museum of Art (Cleveland)

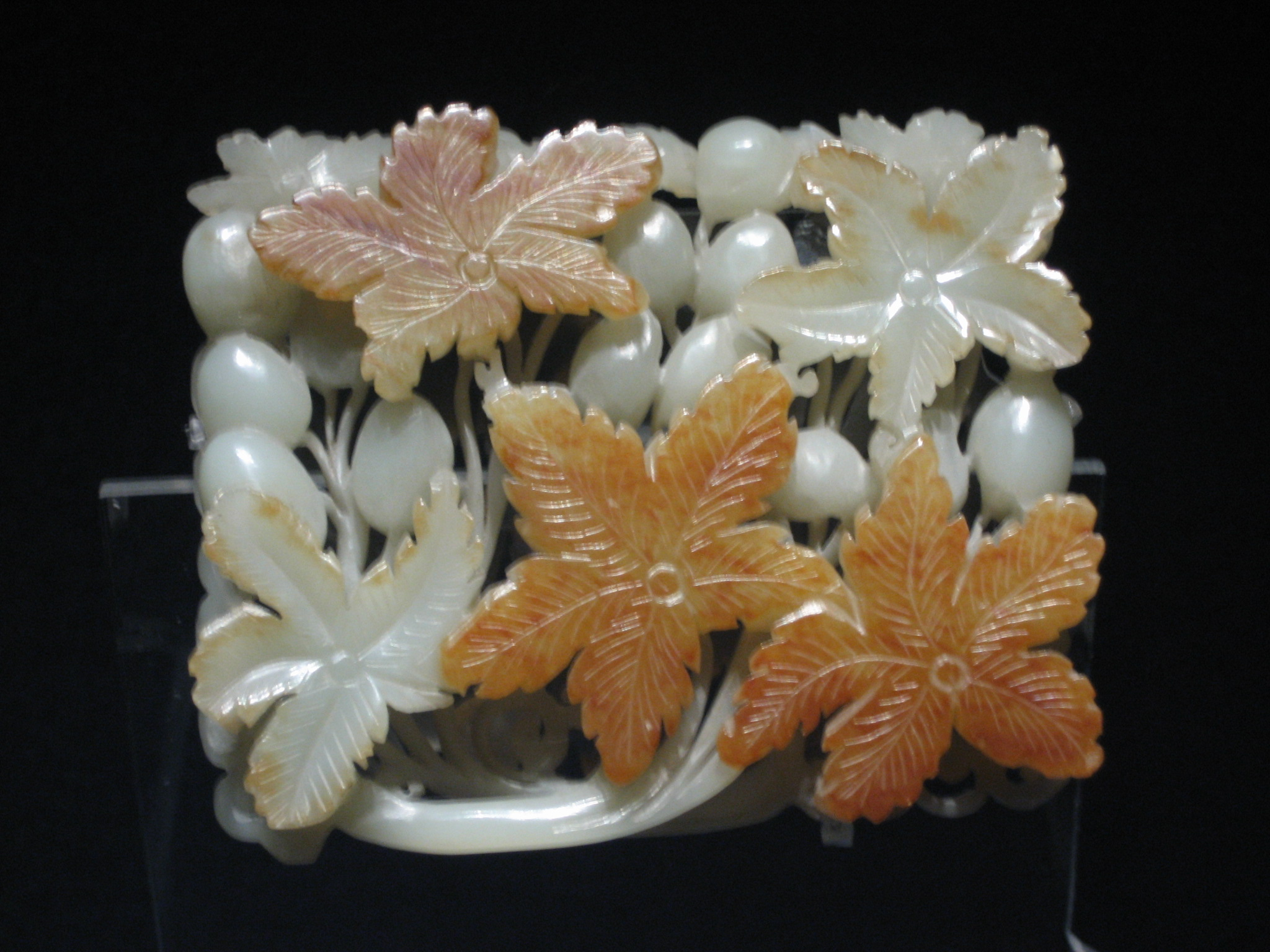
Ornament with flowers and grapes design; 1115–1234; jade; Shanghai Museum (China)

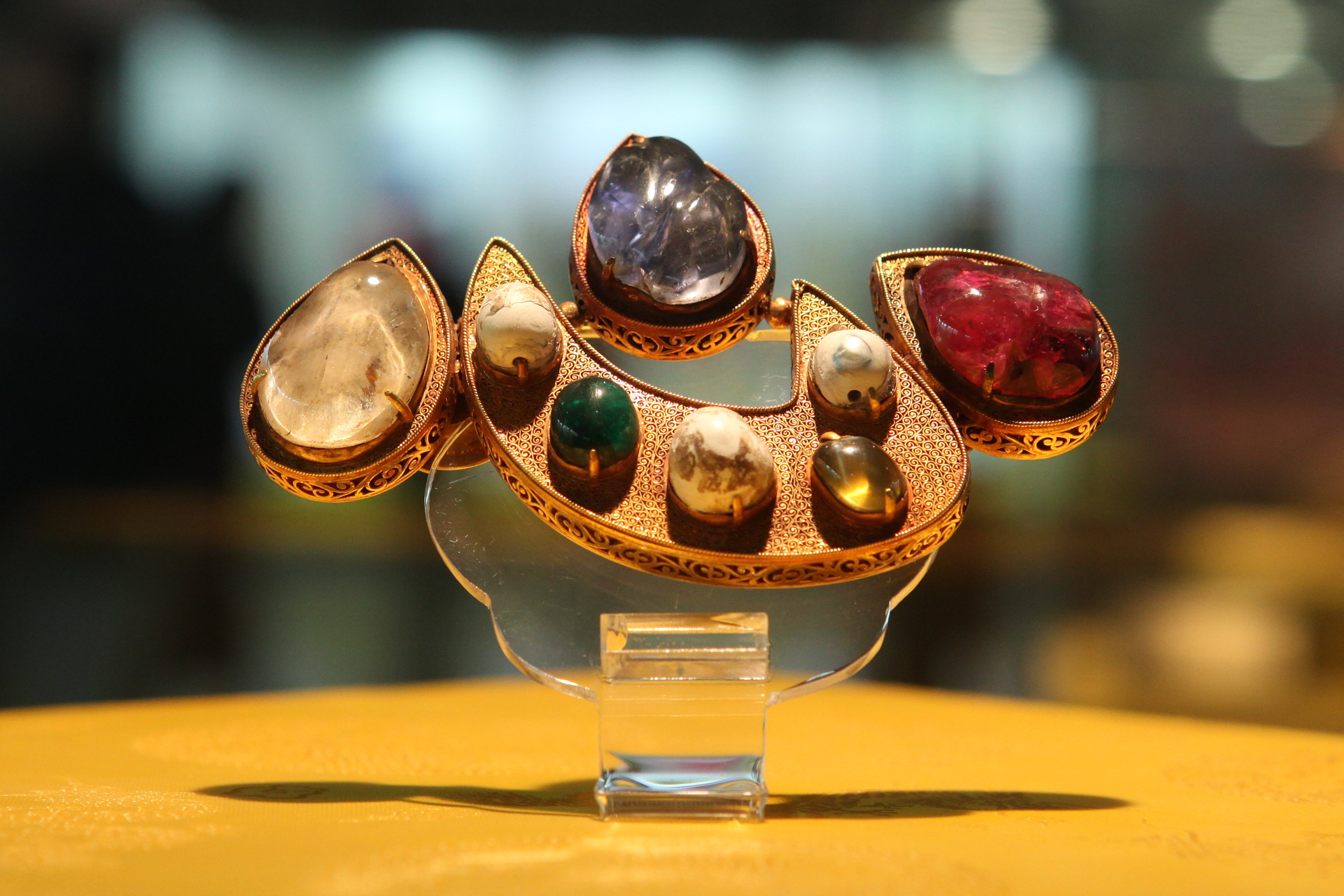
Xin 心 shaped jewellery; 1368–1644; gold, ruby, pearl and other gemstones; about the size of an adult human's palm; Dingling (Beijing, China)

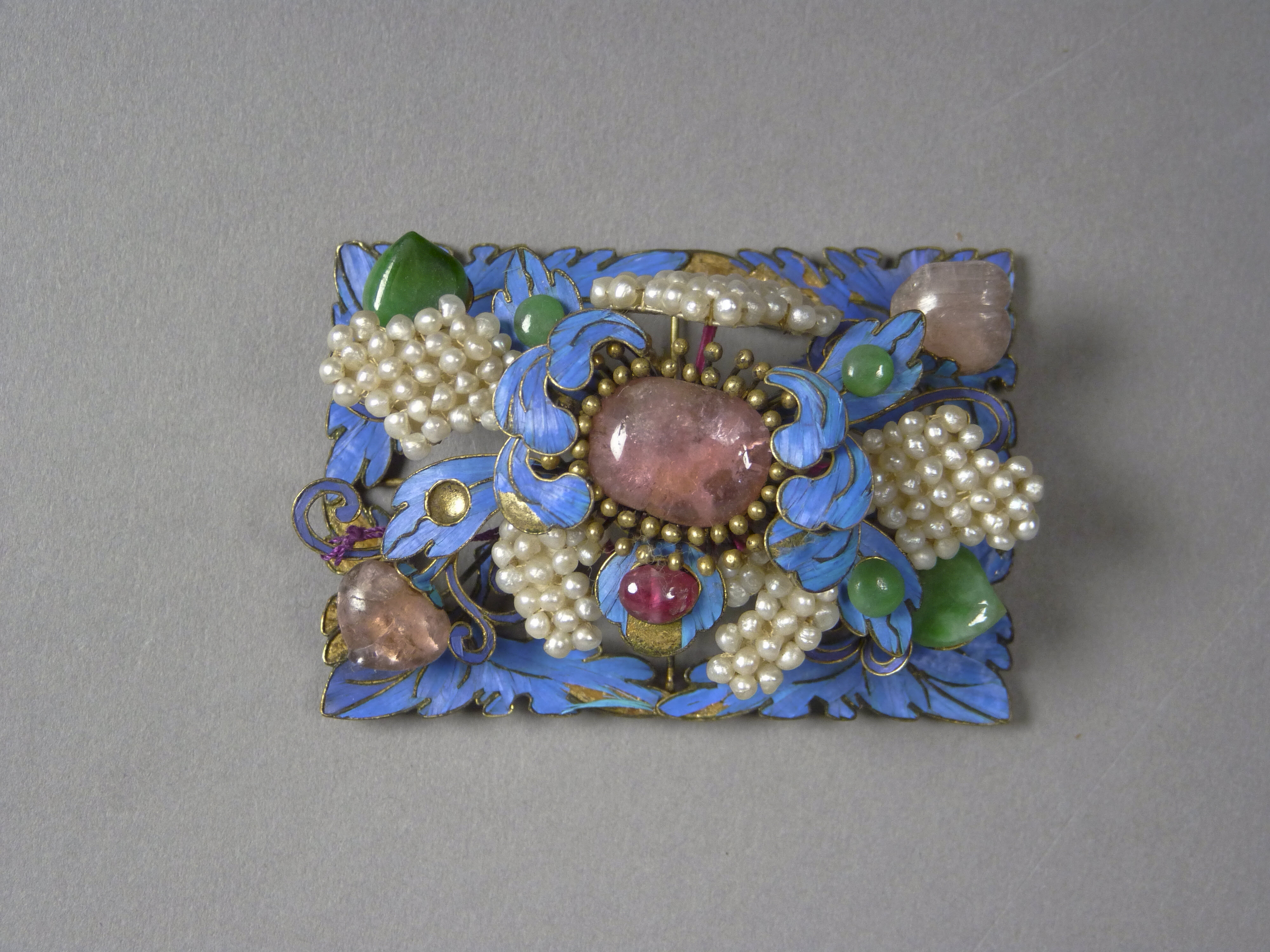
Hat ornament; 18th–19th century; gold, gilded metal, kingfisher feathers, glass and semiprecious stones; various dimensions; Metropolitan Museum of Art (New York City)

==== Indian subcontinent ====
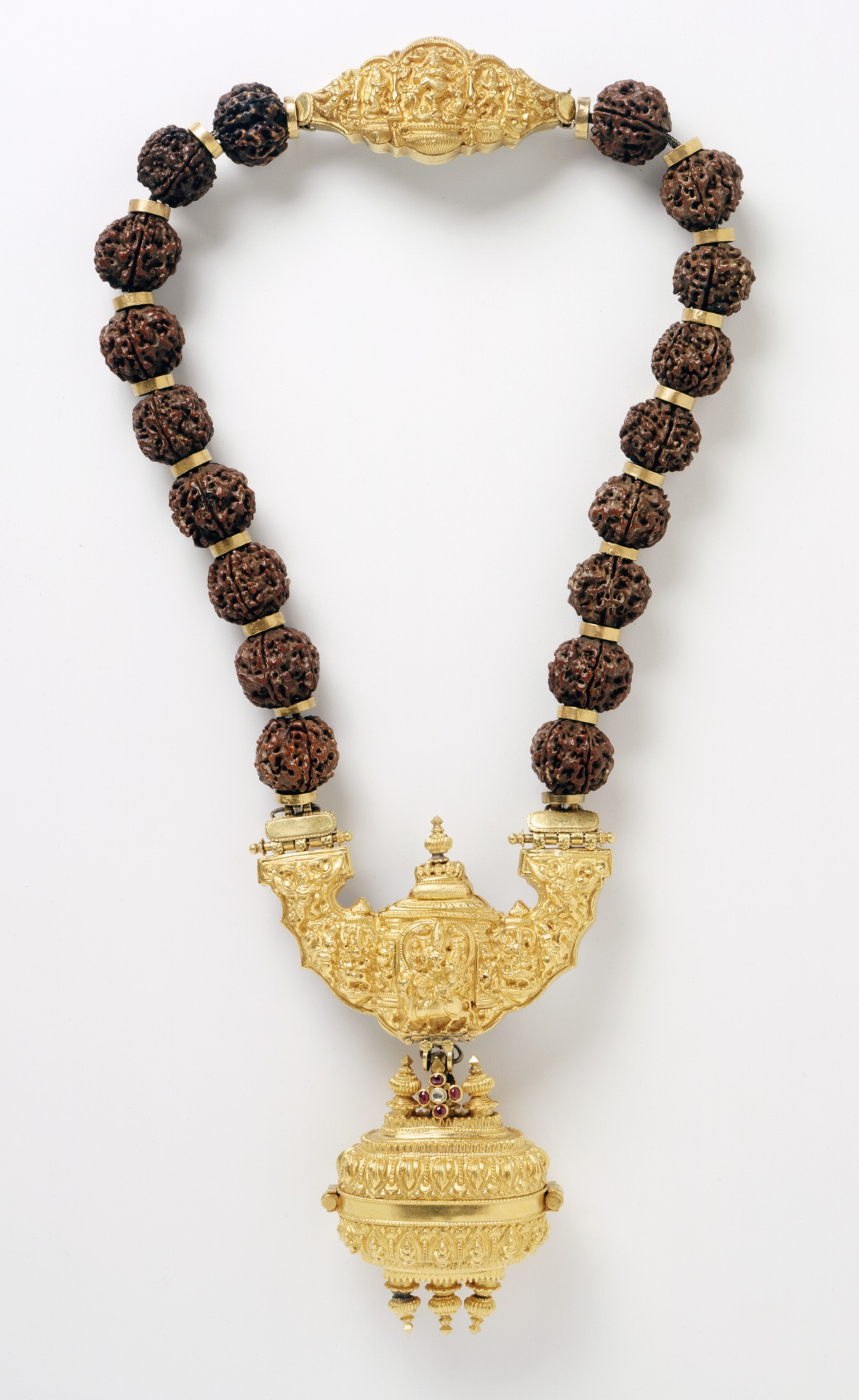
Necklace with Shiva's family; late 19th century; gold inlaid with rubies, a diamond Rudraksha beads (elaeo carpus seeds) and silver back plate on clasp; overall: 38.1 centimetres (15.0 in); Los Angeles County Museum of Art (Los Angeles, US)

The Indian subcontinent has a long jewellery history, which has gone through various changes via cultural influence and politics for more than 5,000–8,000 years. Because India had an abundant supply of precious metals and gems, it prospered financially through export and exchange with other countries. While European traditions were heavily influenced by waxing and waning empires, India enjoyed a continuous development of art forms for some 5,000 years. One of the first to start jewellery making were the peoples of the Indus Valley civilisation. By 1500 BC, the peoples of the Indus Valley were creating gold earrings and necklaces, bead necklaces, and metallic bangles. Before 2100 BC, prior to the period when metals were widely used, the largest jewellery trade in the Indus Valley region was the bead trade. Beads in the Indus Valley were made using simple techniques. First, a bead maker would need a rough stone, which would be bought from an eastern stone trader. The stone would then be placed into a hot oven where it would be heated until it turned deep red, a colour highly prized by people of the Indus Valley. The red stone would then be chipped to the right size and a hole bored through it with primitive drills. The beads were then polished. Some beads were also painted with designs. This art form was often passed down through the family. Children of bead makers often learned how to work beads from a young age. Each stone had its own characteristics related to Hinduism.

Jewellery in the Indus Valley Civilisation was worn predominantly by females, who wore numerous clay or shell bracelets on their wrists. They were often shaped like doughnuts and painted black. Over time, clay bangles were discarded for more durable ones. In present-day India, bangles are made out of metal or glass. Other pieces that women frequently wore were thin bands of gold that would be worn on the forehead, earrings, primitive brooches, chokers, and gold rings. Although women wore jewellery the most, some men in the Indus Valley wore beads. Small beads were often crafted to be placed in men and women's hair. The beads were about one millimetre long.

A female skeleton (presently on display at the National Museum, New Delhi, India) wears a carlinean bangle (bracelet) on her left hand. Kada is a special kind of bracelet and is widely popular in Indian culture. They symbolise animals such as peacock, elephant, etc.

According to Hindu belief, gold and silver are considered as sacred metals. Gold is symbolic of the warm sun, while silver suggests the cool moon. Both are the quintessential metals of Indian jewellery. Pure gold does not oxidise or corrode with time, which is why Hindu tradition associates gold with immortality. Gold imagery occurs frequently in ancient Indian literature. In the Vedic Hindu belief of cosmological creation, the source of physical and spiritual human life originated in and evolved from a golden womb (hiranyagarbha) or egg (hiranyanda), a metaphor of the sun, whose light rises from the primordial waters.

Jewellery had great status with India's royalty; it was so powerful that they established laws, limiting wearing of jewellery to royalty. Only royalty and a few others to whom they granted permission could wear gold ornaments on their feet. This would normally be considered breaking the appreciation of the sacred metals. Even though the majority of the Indian population wore jewellery, Maharajas and people related to royalty had a deeper connection with jewellery. The Maharaja's role was so important that the Hindu philosophers identified him as central to the smooth working of the world. He was considered as a divine being, a deity in human form, whose duty was to uphold and protect dharma, the moral order of the universe. The largest ever single order to Cartier was made in 1925 by the Indian royalty, the Maharaja of Patiala, for the Patiala Necklace and other jewellery worth ₹1,000 million (equivalent to ₹230 billion, US$2.5 billion or €2.2 billion in 2026).

Navaratna (nine gems) is a powerful jewel frequently worn by a Maharaja (Emperor). It is an amulet, which comprises diamond, pearl, ruby, sapphire, emerald, topaz, cat's eye, coral, and hyacinth (red zircon). Each of these stones is associated with a celestial deity, representing the totality of the Hindu universe when all nine gems are together. The diamond is the most powerful gem among the nine stones. There were various cuts for the gemstone. Indian Kings bought gemstones privately from the sellers. Maharaja and other royal family members value gem as Hindu God. They exchanged gems with people to whom they were very close, especially the royal family members and other intimate allies.

India was the first country to mine diamonds, with some mines dating back to 296 BC. India traded the diamonds, realising their valuable qualities. Historically, diamonds have been given to retain or regain a lover's or ruler's lost favour, as symbols of tribute, or as an expression of fidelity in exchange for concessions and protection. Mughal emperors and Kings used the diamonds as a means of assuring their immortality by having their names and worldly titles inscribed upon them. Moreover, it has played and continues to play a pivotal role in Indian social, political, economic, and religious event, as it often has done elsewhere. In Indian history, diamonds have been used to acquire military equipment, finance wars, foment revolutions, and tempt defections. They have contributed to the abdication or the decapitation of potentates. They have been used to murder a representative of the dominating power by lacing his food with crushed diamond. Indian diamonds have been used as security to finance large loans needed to buttress politically or economically tottering regimes. Victorious military heroes have been honoured by rewards of diamonds and also have been used as ransom payment for release from imprisonment or abduction.

Today, many jewellery designs and traditions are used, and jewellery is commonplace in Indian ceremonies and weddings. For many Indians, especially those who follow the Hindu or Jain faiths, bridal jewellery is known as streedhan and functions as personal wealth for the bride only, as a sort of financial security. For this reason, this jewellery, especially in the sacred metals of gold and silver, has large cultural significance for Indian brides. Jewellery is worn on the arms and hands, ears, neck, hair, head, feet, toes and waist to bless the bride with prosperity.

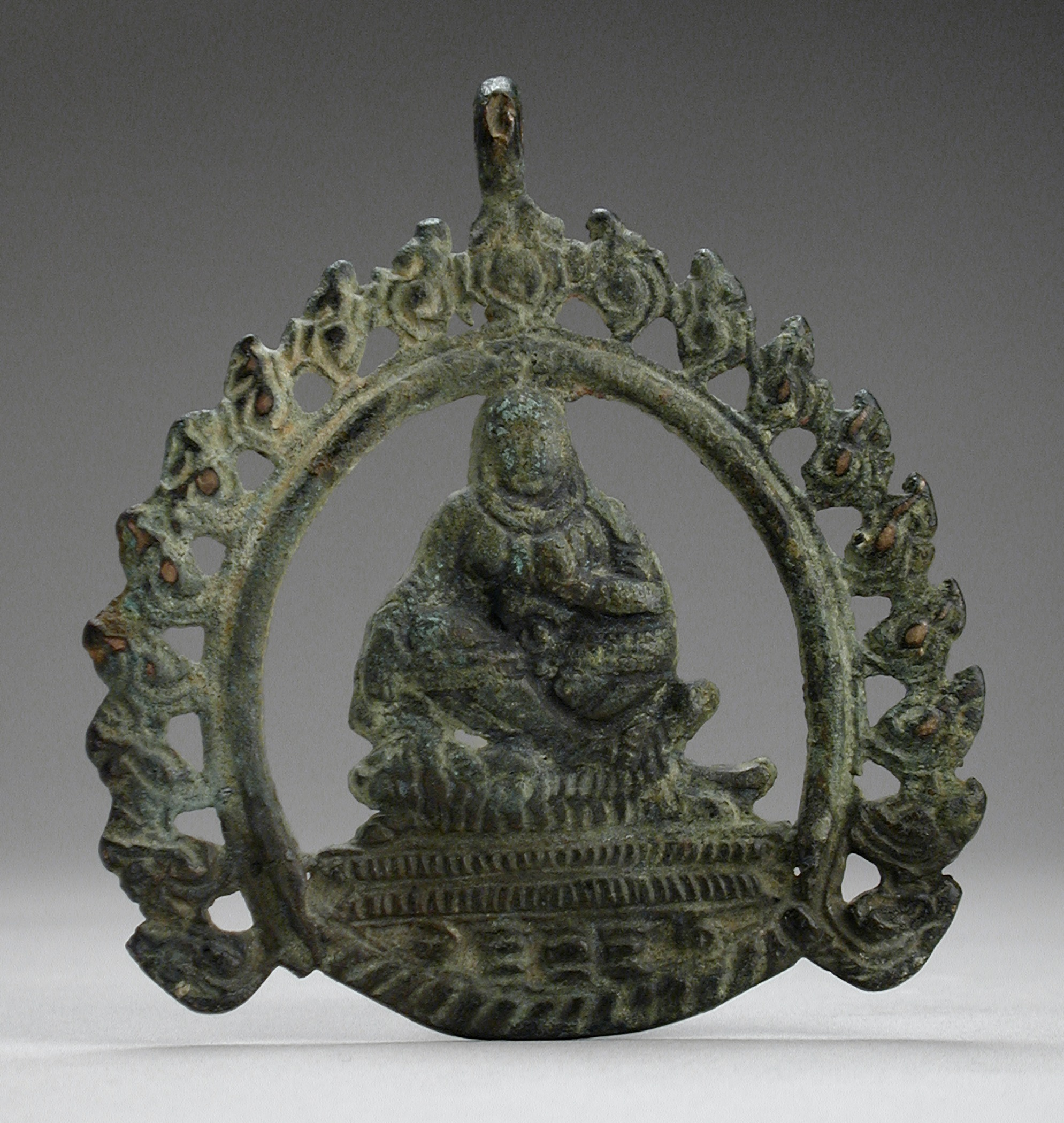
Pendant probably with Siddha; 8th–9th century; copper alloy; 8.89 by 7.93 by 0.31 centimetres (3.50 in × 3.12 in × 0.12 in); Los Angeles County Museum of Art (Los Angeles)

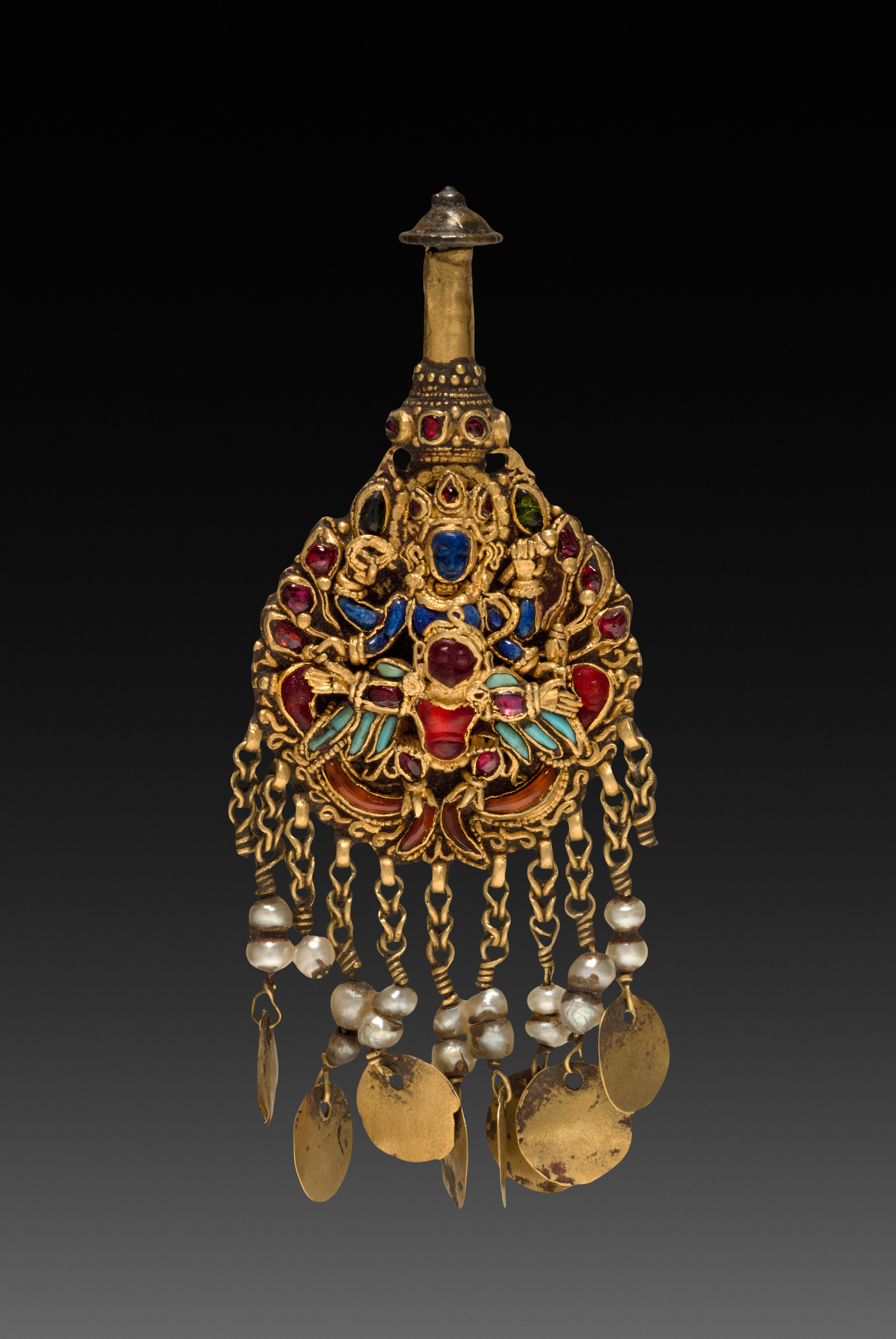
Earring with Vishnu riding Garuda; c. 1600; gold set with jewels and semi-precious stones; overall: 2.6 centimetres (1.0 in); from Nepal; Cleveland Museum of Art (Cleveland)

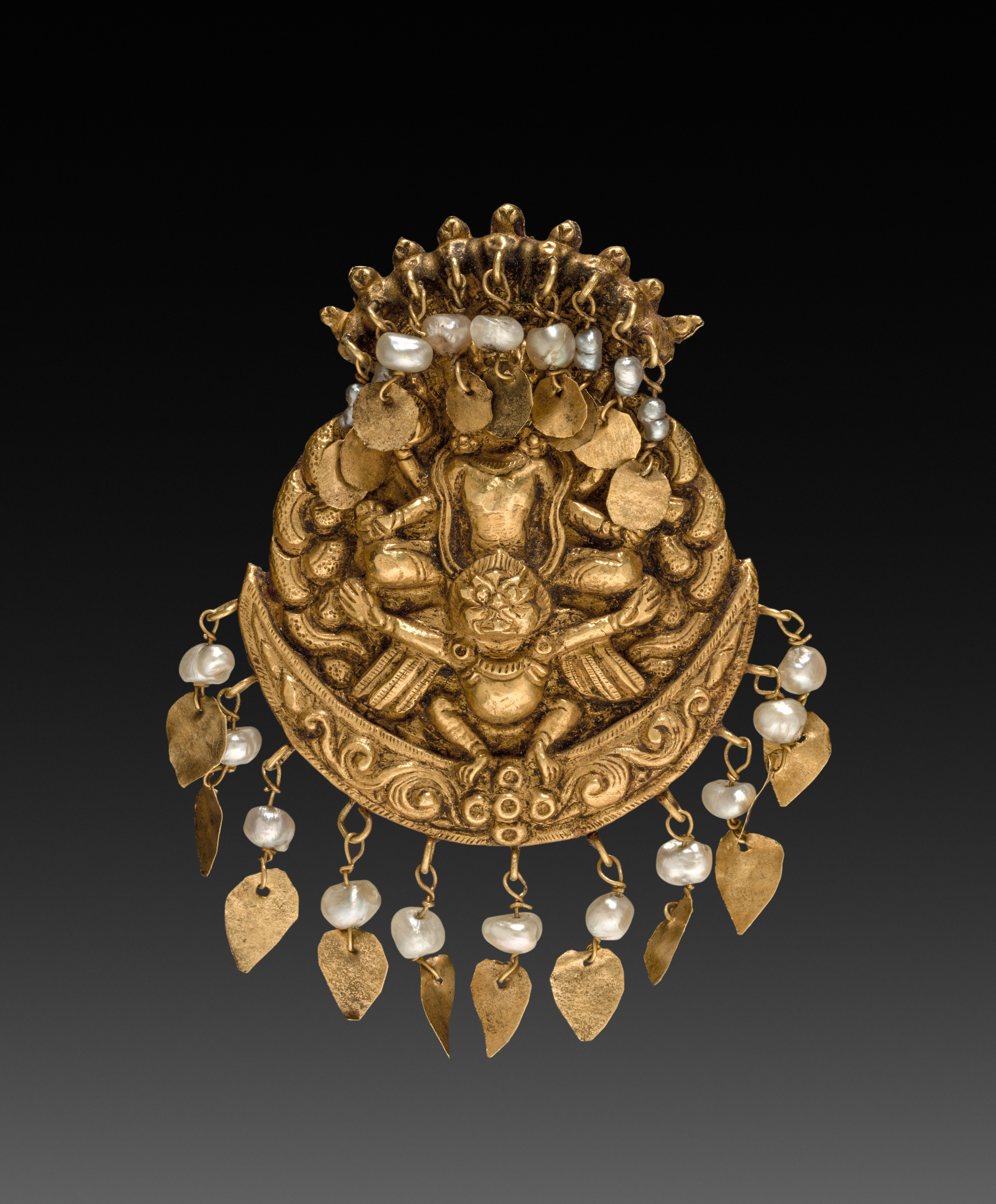
Earring with four-armed Vishnu riding Garuda with Nagas (serpent divinities); c. 1600; repousse gold with pearls; overall: 3.6 cm; from Nepal; Cleveland Museum of Art

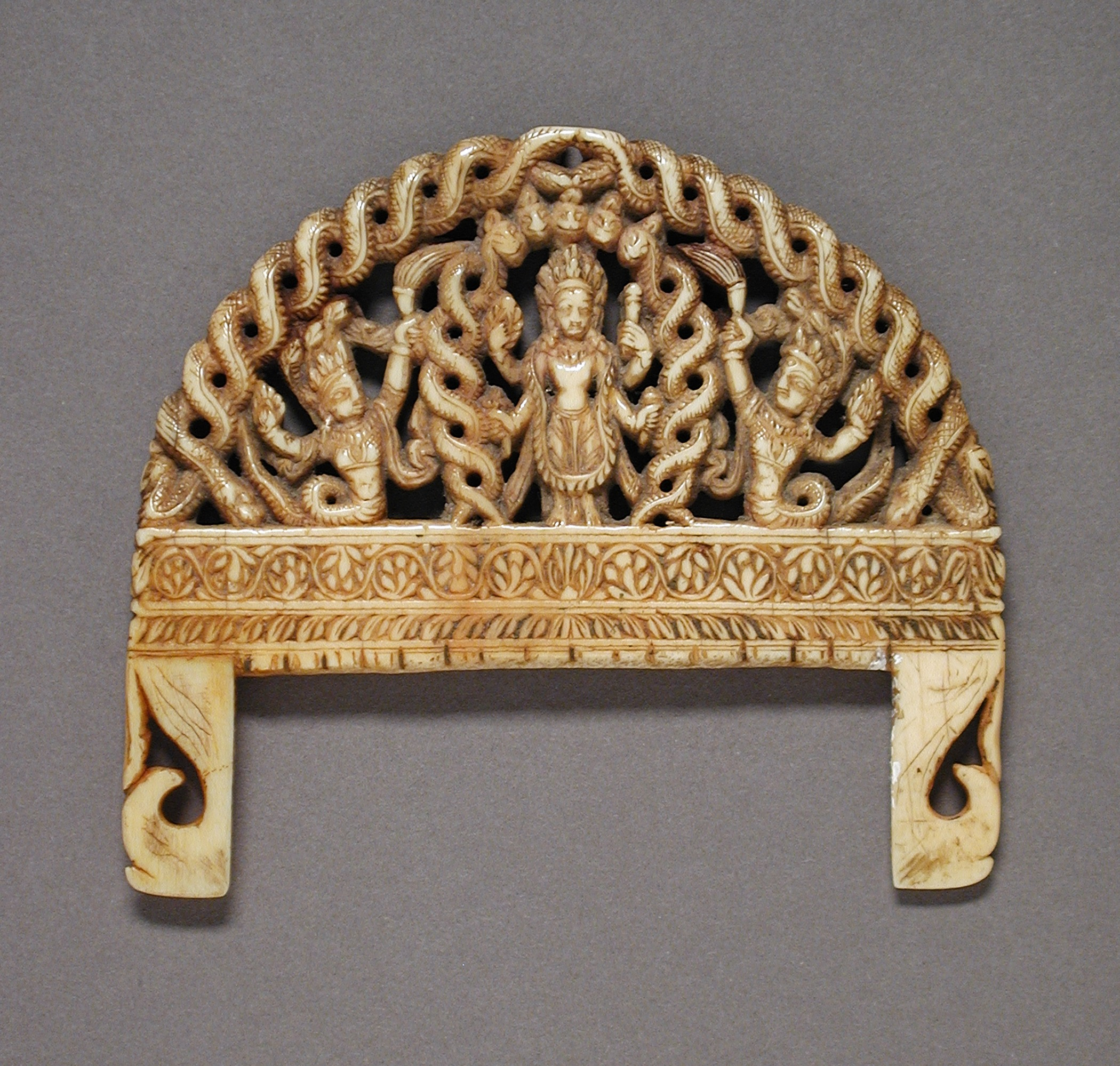
Comb with Vishnu adored by serpents; 1750–1800; ivory with traces of paint; 6.99 by 7.94 centimetres (2.75 in × 3.13 in); from Nepal; Los Angeles County Museum of Art

=== North and South America ===
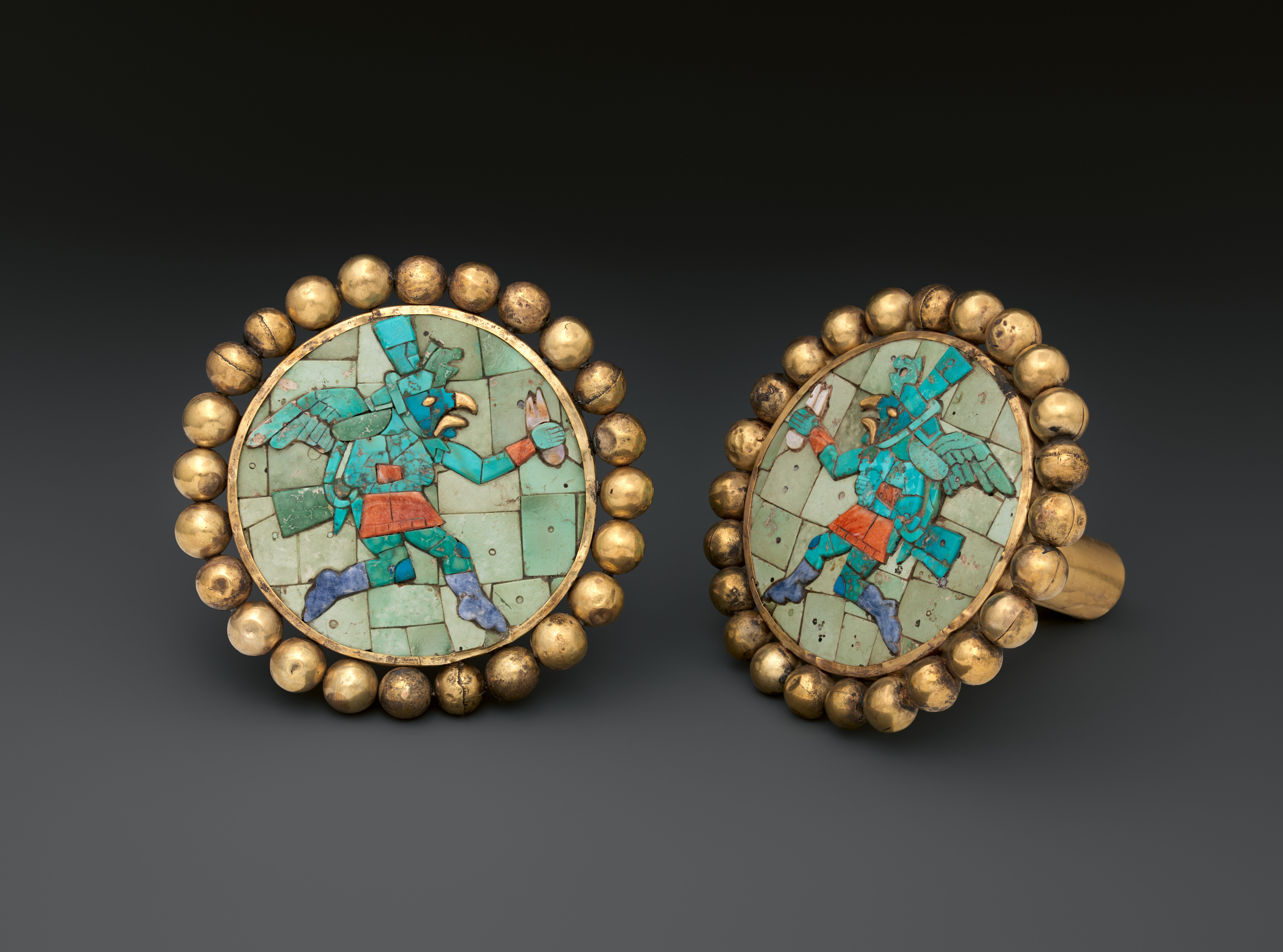
Moche ear ornaments depicting winged runners; 3rd–7th century; gold, turquoise, sodalite and shell; diameter: 8 cm; Metropolitan Museum of Art (New York City)

Jewellery making started in the Americas with the arrival of Paleo-Indians more than 15,000 years ago. This jewellery would have been made from stone, shell, bone and other perishable materials. The American continent is home to 2 cradles of civilisation: in the Andes and Mesoamerica. Cultures in these regions developed more complex methods of jewellery creation. The Andes is the origin of hot working metallurgy in the Americas and consequently the region has the longest history of work in materials such as silver, platinum and gold. Metallurgy began in Mesoamerica during the Termainal Classic era, likely arriving from direct maritime trade with the Andean cultures. As a result, western Mesoamerican cultures, such as the Tarascans and Mixtecs, had more complex use of the technology.

With the Moche culture, goldwork flourished. The pieces are no longer simple metalwork, but are now masterful examples of jewellery making. Pieces are sophisticated in their design, and feature inlays of turquoise, mother of pearl, spondylus shell, and amethyst. The nose and ear ornaments, chest plates, small containers and whistles are considered masterpieces of ancient Peruvian culture. A notable example of Andean metallurgy is the Northern Andean cultures' work with platinum, which has a much higher melting point than other precious metals. There are only a few known examples of cold worked platinum in the Old World and no known intentionally hot worked examples (platinum was not identified as a separate element and small inclusions appeared in some goldwork). In the New World, however, certain Andean cultures recognised platinum as a separate metal and were able to incorporate it into jewellery, such as through sintering it with gold.

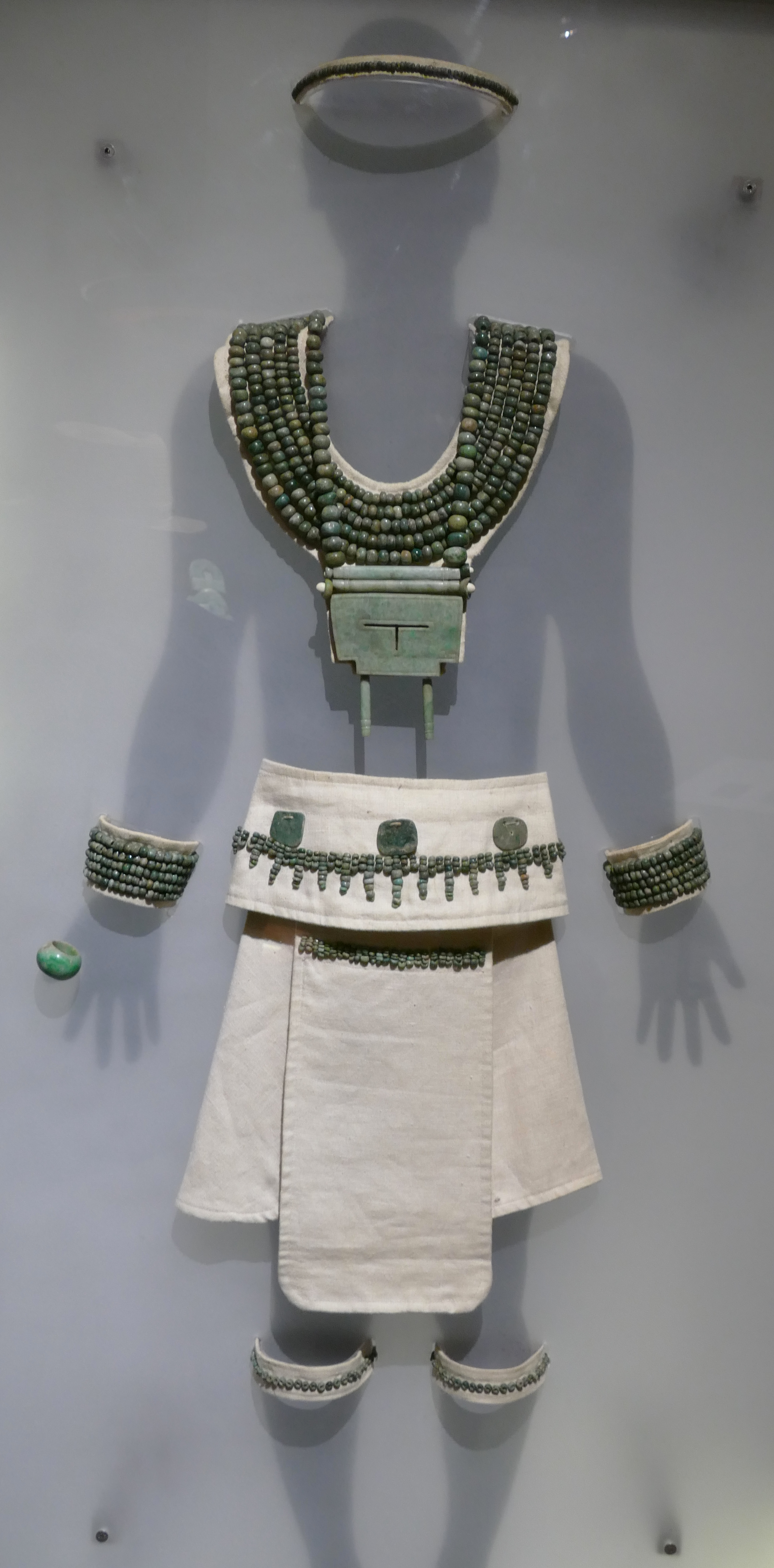
Jadeite funerary jewellery from Tomb 1 of Structure VII of Calakmul, thought to belong to Yuknoom Tookʼ Kʼawiil. Late Classic (660 to 750 AD).

Among the Late Post-Classic Aztecs, only nobility wore gold jewellery, as it showed their rank, power, and wealth. A large portion of "Aztec gold" jewellery was created by Mixtec artisans. The Mixtecs were particularly known for their goldwork and gold jewellery was part of the tribute paid by Mixtec polities to the Aztecs. In general, the more jewellery an Aztec noble wore, the higher his status or prestige. The Emperor and his High Priests, for example, would be nearly completely covered in jewellery when making public appearances. Although gold was the most common and a popular material used in Aztec jewellery, jade, turquoise, and certain feathers were considered more valuable. In addition to adornment and status, the Aztecs also used jewellery in sacrifices to appease the gods.

Another ancient American civilisation with expertise in jewellery making were the Maya. During the Pre-Classic and Classic era of Maya civilisation, the Maya were making jewellery from local materials such as jade, pearls, and seashell while also incorporating imported materials such as obsidian and turquoise. In the Terminal Classic and Post-Classic, importation of gold, silver, bronze, and copper lead to the use of these materials in jewellery. Merchants and nobility were the only few that wore expensive jewellery in the Maya region, much the same as with the Aztecs. Jade in particular had an important role across Mesoamerica.

In Northern America, Native Americans used shells, wood, turquoise, and soapstone The turquoise was used in necklaces and to be placed in earrings. The turquoise incorporated into Mesoamerican jewellery was primarily obtained through trade with Oasisamerica. Native Americans with access to oyster shells, often located in only one location in America, traded the shells with other tribes, showing the great importance of the body adornment trade in Northern America.

Jewellery played a major role in the fate of the Americas when the Spanish colonisers were spurred to search for gold on the American mainland after coming into contact with Caribbean natives that had gold jewellery obtained through trade with the mainland. Continued contact with Native Americans wearing gold jewellery eventually lead to Spanish expeditions of the mythological El Dorado.

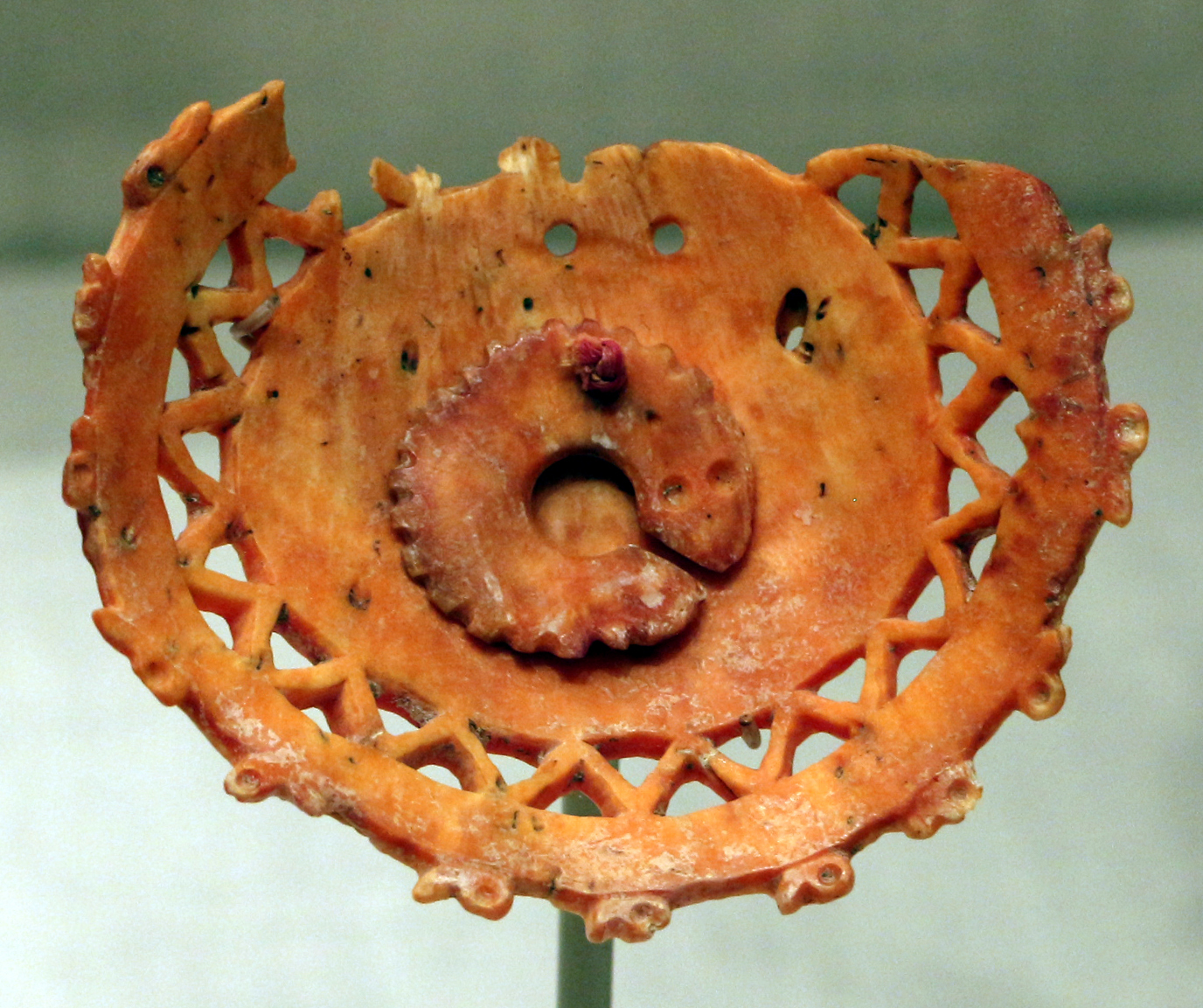
Pendant made from a spondylus shell, Western Mexico shaft tomb tradition, 200 BC to 200 AD, now at the Art Institute of Chicago, United States.

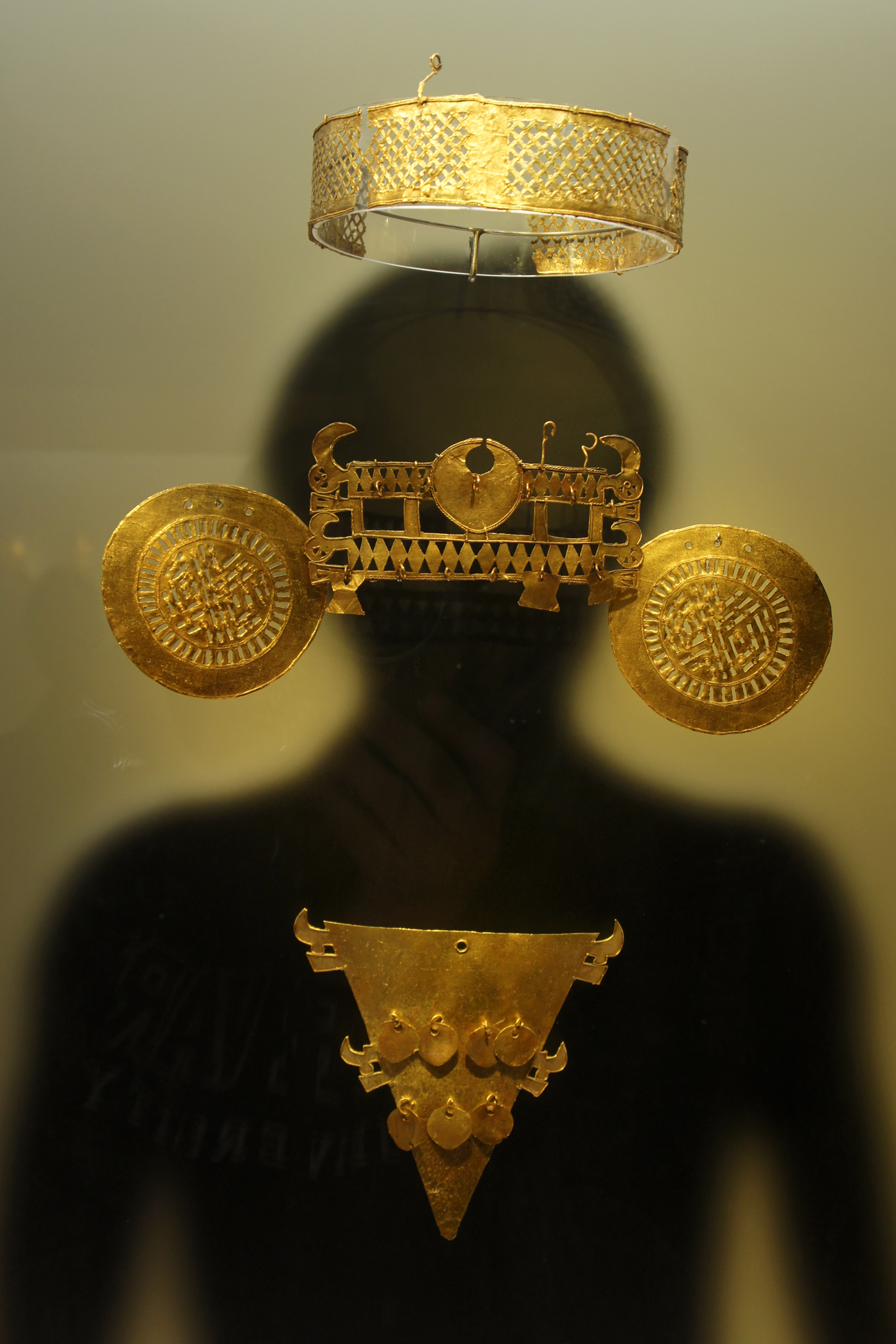
Muisca gold jewellery, including a headband, nose ornament and pectoral, on display at the Gold Museum in Bogota, Colombia.

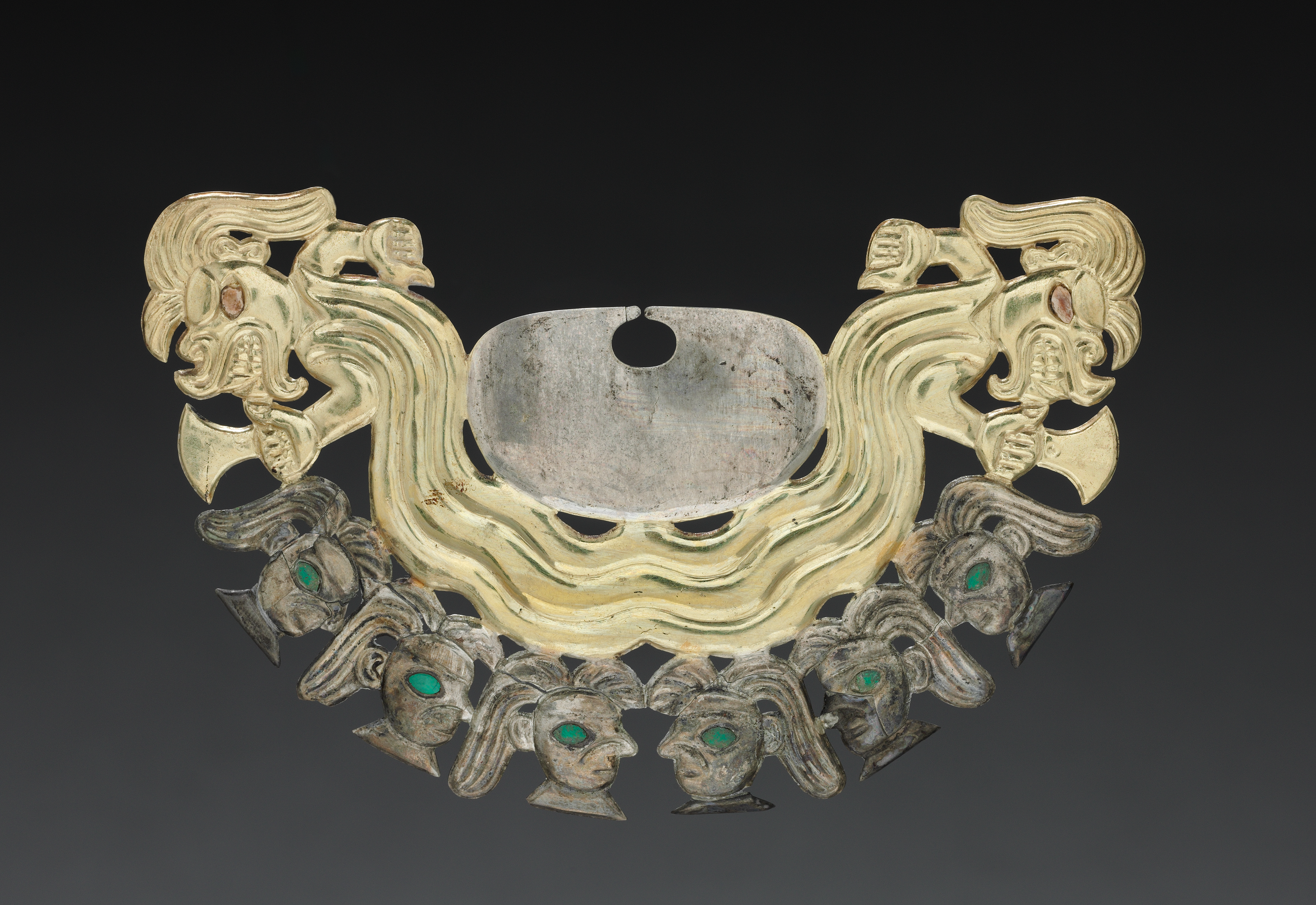
Moche nose ornament made from silver and gold-silver alloy, inlaid with malachite, now at the Cleveland Museum of Art, United States.

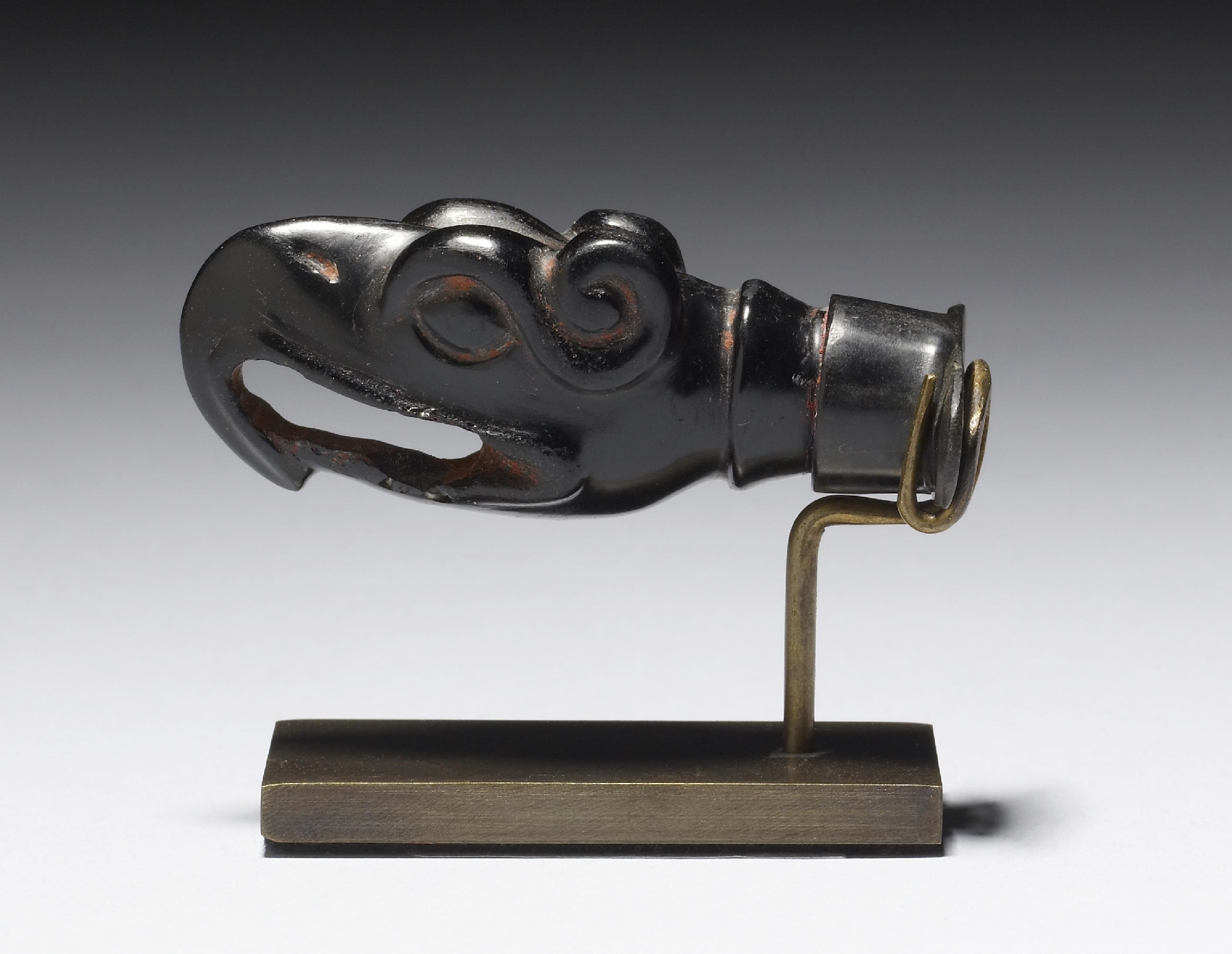
Mixtec-Puebla style labret made from obsidian in the shape of an eagle, now at the Walters Art Museum in Baltimore, United States.

==== Native American ====
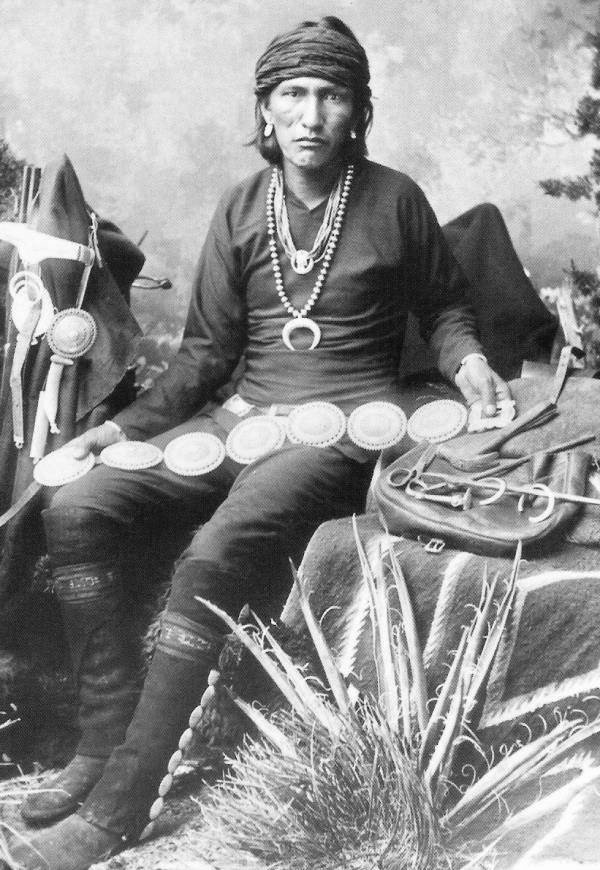
Bai-De-Schluch-A-Ichin or Be-Ich-Schluck-Ich-In-Et-Tzuzzigi (Slender Silversmith) "Metal Beater," Navajo silversmith, photo by George Ben Wittick, 1883

Native American jewellery is the personal adornment, often in the forms of necklaces, earrings, bracelets, rings, pins, brooches, labrets, and more, made by the Indigenous peoples of the United States. Native American jewellery reflects the cultural diversity and history of its makers. Native American tribes continue to develop distinct aesthetics rooted in their personal artistic visions and cultural traditions. Artists create jewellery for adornment, ceremonies, and trade. Lois Sherr Dubin writes, "[i]n the absence of written languages, adornment became an important element of Indian [Native American] communication, conveying many levels of information." Later, jewellery and personal adornment "...signaled resistance to assimilation. It remains a major statement of tribal and individual identity."

Within the Haida Nation of the Pacific Northwest, copper was used as a form of jewellery for creating bracelets.

Metalsmiths, beaders, carvers, and lapidaries combine a variety of metals, hardwoods, precious and semi-precious gemstones, beadwork, quillwork, teeth, bones, hide, vegetal fibres, and other materials to create jewellery. Contemporary Native American jewellery ranges from hand-quarried and processed stones and shells to computer-fabricated steel and titanium jewellery.

=== Pacific ===
Jewellery making in the Pacific started later than in other areas because of recent human settlement. Early Pacific jewellery was made of bone, wood, and other natural materials, and thus has not survived. Most Pacific jewellery is worn above the waist, with headdresses, necklaces, hair pins, and arm and waist belts being the most common pieces.

Jewellery in the Pacific, with the exception of Australia, is worn to be a symbol of either fertility or power. Elaborate headdresses are worn by many Pacific cultures and some, such as the inhabitants of Papua New Guinea, wear certain headdresses once they have killed an enemy. Tribesman may wear boar bones through their noses.

Island jewellery is still very much primal because of the lack of communication with outside cultures. Some areas of Borneo and Papua New Guinea are yet to be explored by Western nations. However, the island nations that were flooded with Western missionaries have had drastic changes made to their jewellery designs. Missionaries saw any type of tribal jewellery as a sign of the wearer's devotion to paganism. Thus, many tribal designs were lost forever in the mass conversion to Christianity.

Australia is now the number one supplier of opals in the world. Opals had already been mined in Europe and South America for many years prior, but in the late 19th century, the Australian opal market became predominant. Australian opals are only mined in a few select places around the country, making it one of the most profitable stones in the Pacific.

The New Zealand Māori traditionally had a strong culture of personal adornment, most famously the hei-tiki. Hei-tikis are traditionally carved by hand from bone, nephrite, or bowenite.

Nowadays, a wide range of such traditionally inspired items such as bone carved pendants based on traditional fishhooks hei matau and other greenstone jewellery are popular with young New Zealanders of all backgrounds – for whom they relate to a generalised sense of New Zealand identity. These trends have contributed towards a worldwide interest in traditional Māori culture and arts.

Other than jewellery created through Māori influence, modern jewellery in New Zealand is multicultural and varied.

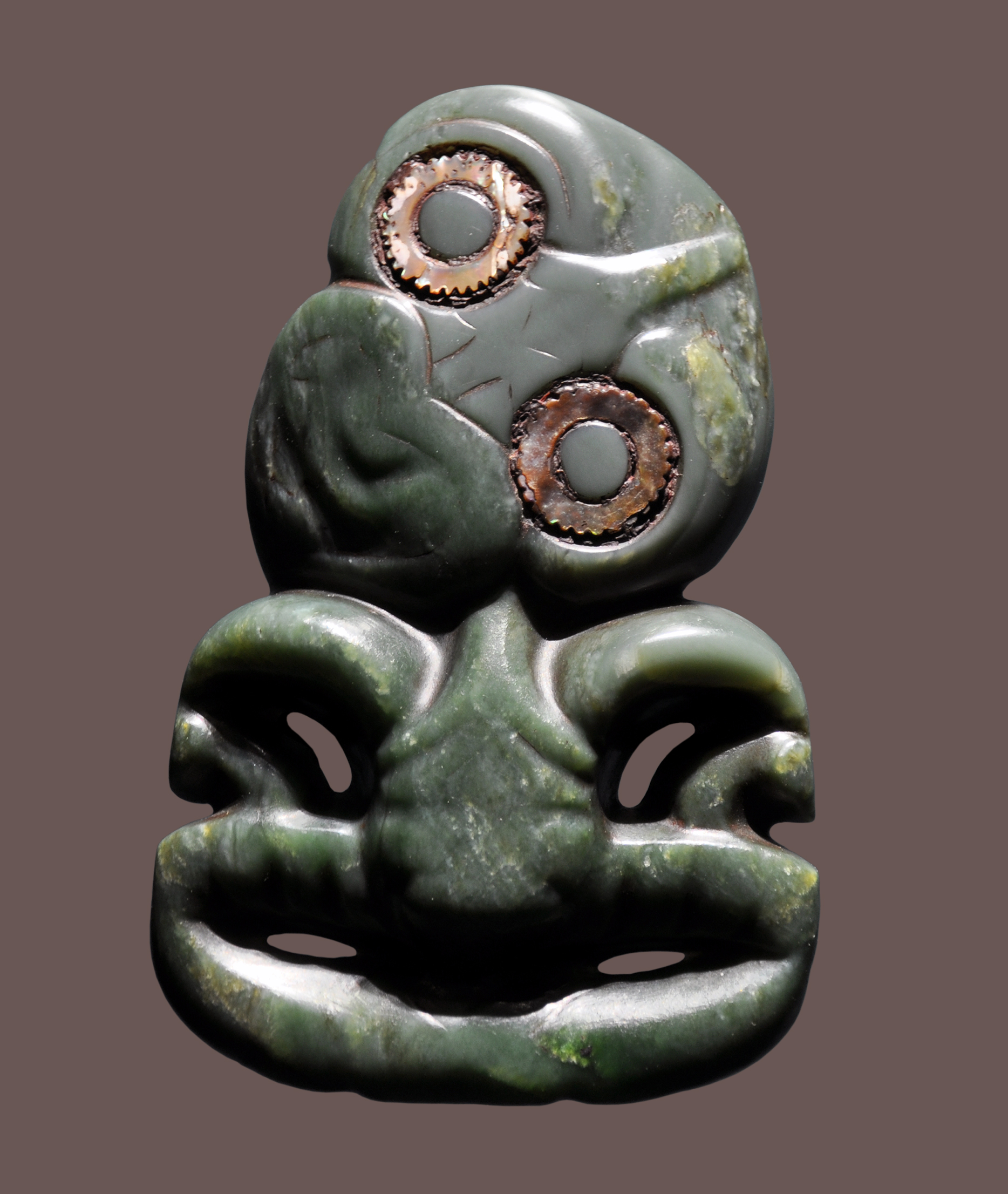
Māori hei-tiki; 1500–1800; jade (nephrite), abalone shell and pigments; from the New Zealand; Musée du quai Branly – Jacques Chirac (Paris)

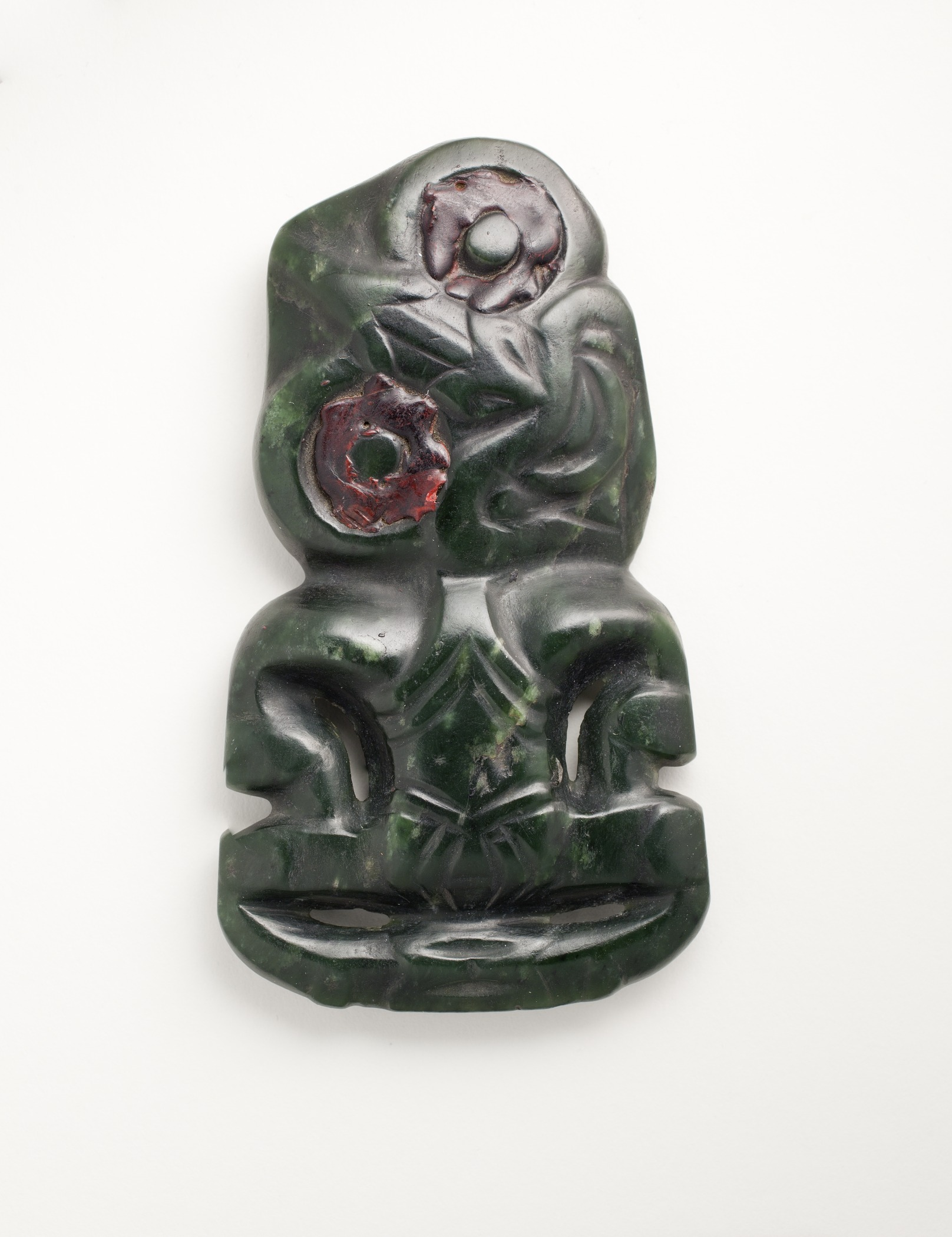
Hei-tiki; 18th century; nephrite and haliotis shell; 10.9 centimetres (4.3 in); from the New Zealand; Los Angeles County Museum of Art (Los Angeles)

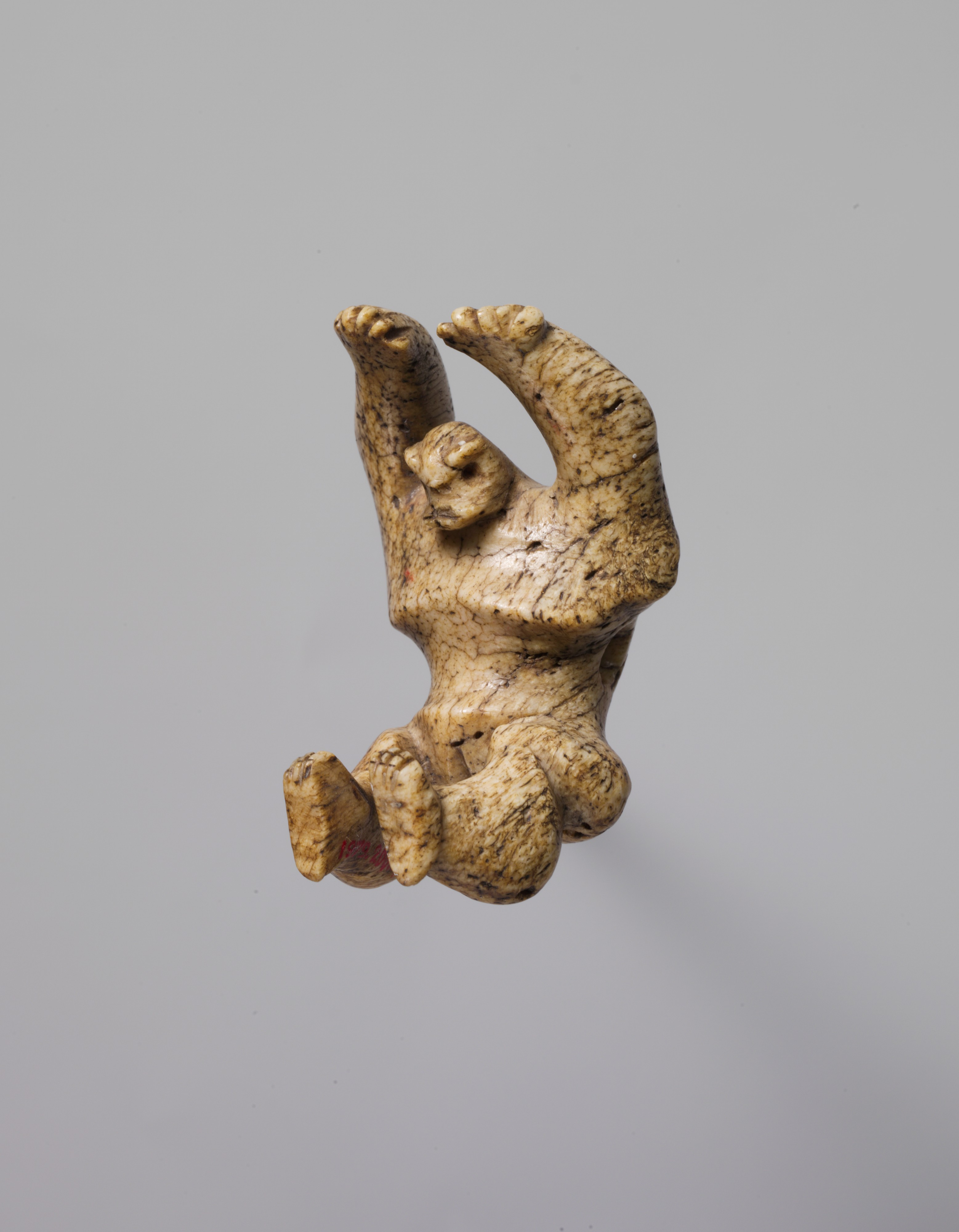
Hawaiian pendant; 18th–19th century; whalebone; height: 6 centimetres (2.4 in), width, 3.8 centimetres (1.5 in); Metropolitan Museum of Art (New York City)

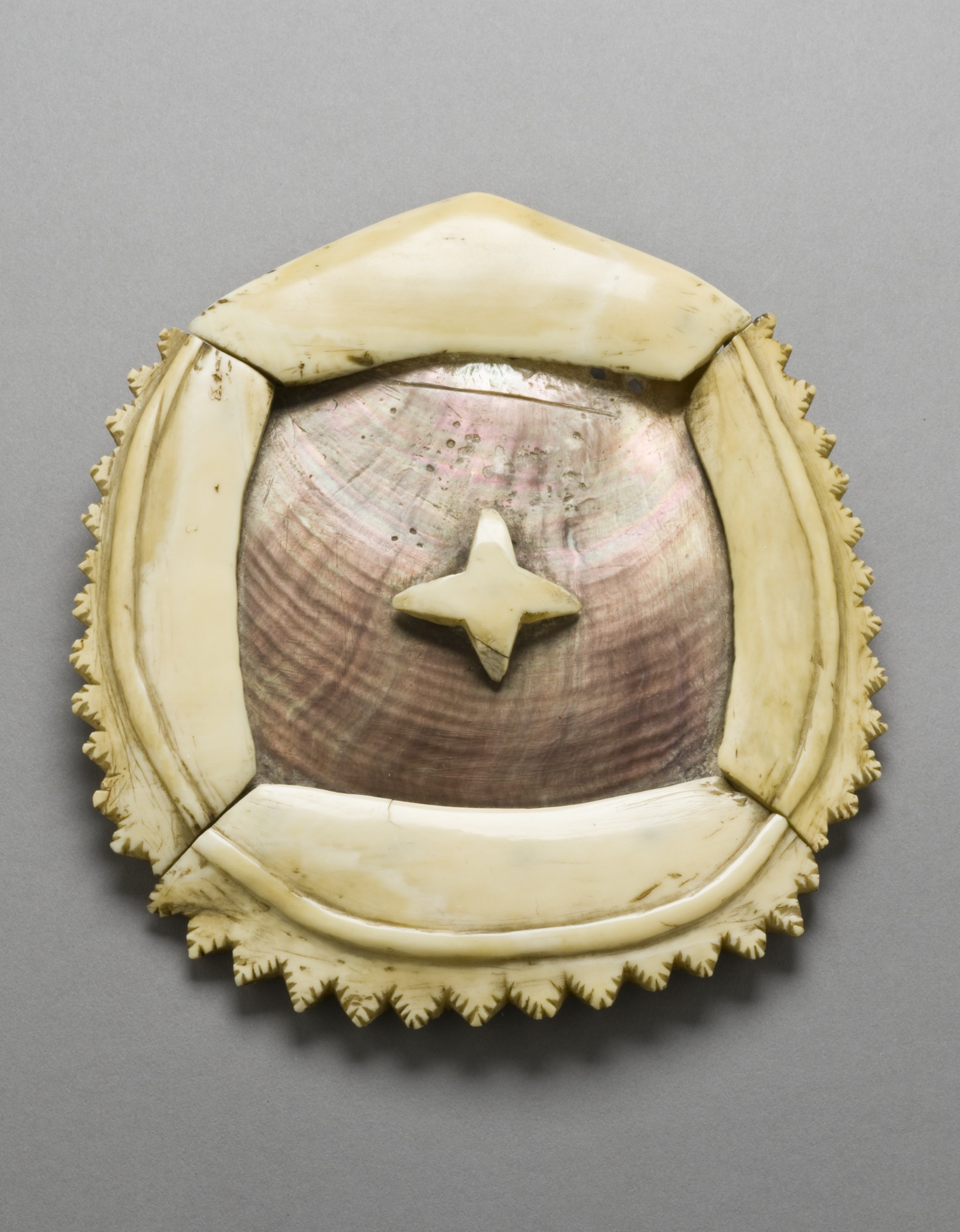
Breast Ornament (civa vonovono); c. 1850; whale ivory, pearl shell and fiber; height: 12.7 centimetres (5.0 in), diameter: 17.78 centimetres (7.00 in); from Fiji; Los Angeles County Museum of Art

== Modern ==
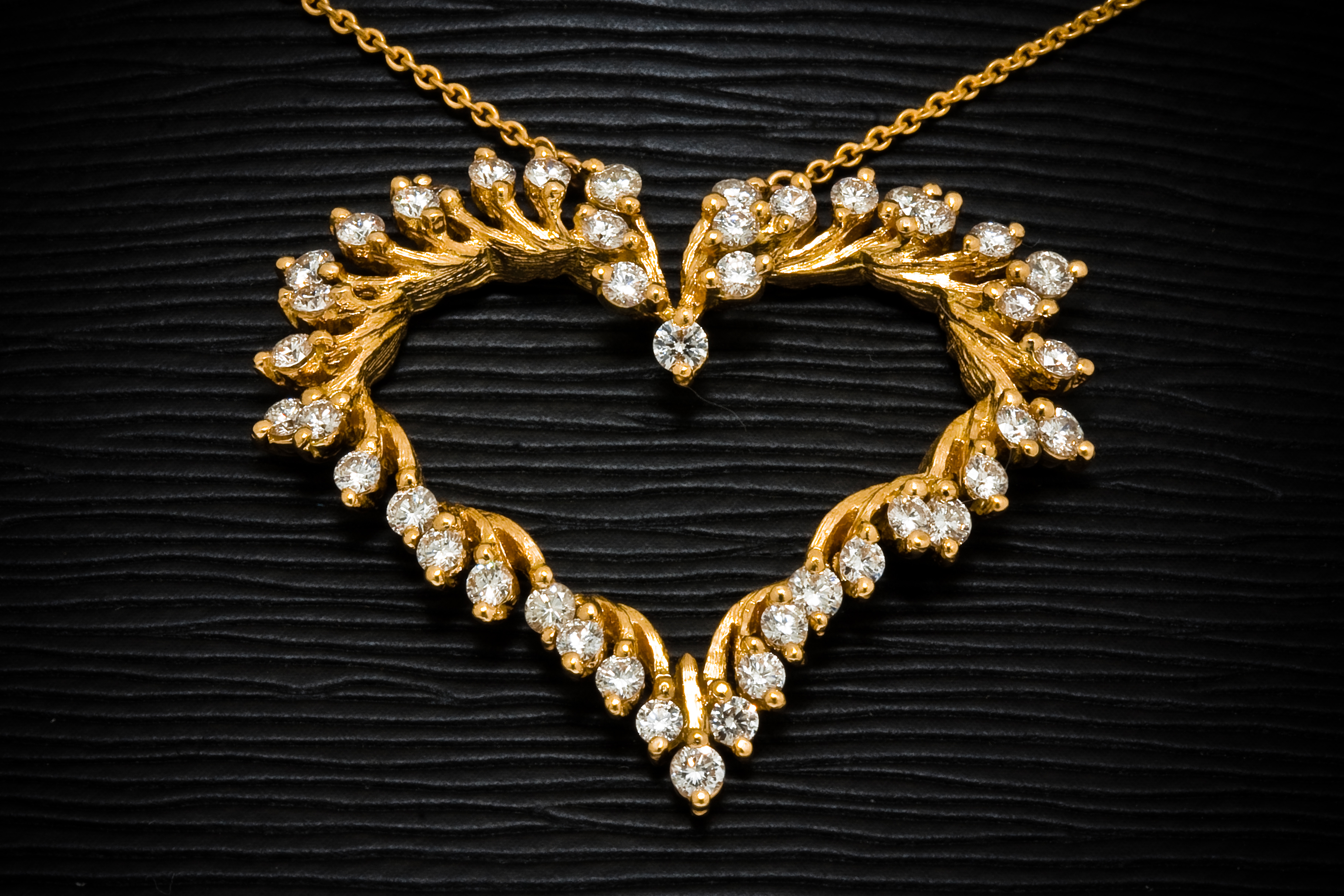
Gold and gemstone contemporary jewellery design

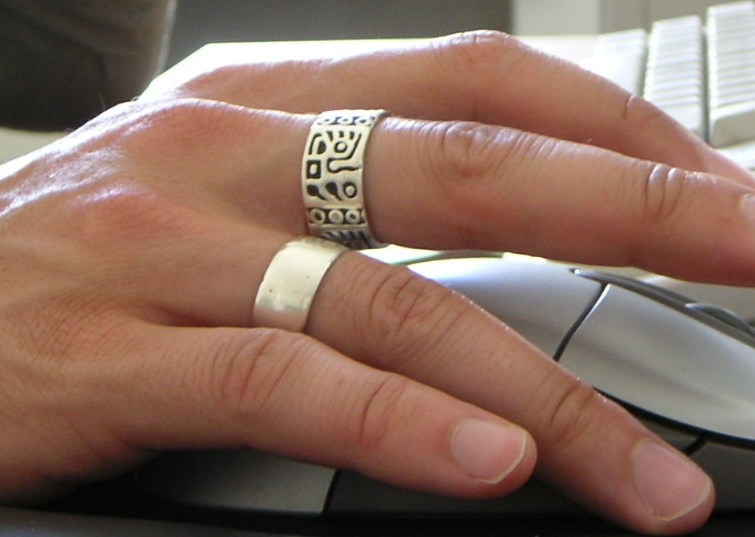
Male hand with modern silver rings, one with a tribal motif.

Most modern commercial jewellery continues traditional forms and styles, but designers such as Georg Jensen have widened the concept of wearable art. The advent of new materials, such as plastics, Precious Metal Clay (PMC), and colouring techniques, has led to increased variety in styles. Other advances, such as the development of improved pearl harvesting by people such as Mikimoto Kōkichi and the development of improved quality synthetic gemstones such as moissanite, has placed jewellery within the economic grasp of a much larger segment of the population.

The "jewellery as art" movement was spearheaded by artisans such as Robert Lee Morris and continued by designers such as Gill Forsbrook in the UK. Influence from other cultural forms is also evident. One example of this is bling-bling style jewellery, popularised by hip-hop and rap artists in the early 21st century, e.g. grills, a type of jewellery worn over the teeth.

The late 20th century saw the blending of European design with oriental techniques such as Mokume-gane. The following are innovations in the decades straddling the year 2000: "Mokume-gane, hydraulic die forming, anti-clastic raising, fold-forming, reactive metal anodising, shell forms, PMC, photoetching, and [use of] CAD/CAM."

Also, 3D printing as a production technique has become increasingly common . With a great variety of services offering this production method, jewellery design becomes accessible to a growing number of creatives. A advantage of using 3d printing are the relatively low costs for prototypes, small batch series or unique and personalised designs. Crafting certain shapes by hand may be difficult or even impossible, but they can often be successfully produced using 3D printing technology. Popular materials to print include polyamide, steel and wax (latter for further processing). Every printable material has its very own constraints that have to be considered while designing the piece of jewellery using 3D modelling software.

Artisan jewellery continues to grow as both a hobby and a profession. With more than 17 United States periodicals about beading alone, resources, accessibility, and a low initial cost of entry continues to expand production of hand-made adornments. Some typical examples of artisan jewellery can be seen at The Metropolitan Museum of Art in New York City. The increase in numbers of students choosing to study jewellery design and production in Australia has grown in the past 20 years, and Australia now has a thriving contemporary jewellery community. Many of these jewellers have embraced modern materials and techniques, as well as incorporating traditional workmanship.

More expansive use of metal to adorn the wearer, where the piece is larger and more elaborate than what would normally be considered jewellery, has come to be referred to by designers and fashion writers as metal couture.

== Masonic ==
Freemasons attach jewels to their detachable collars when in Lodge to signify a Brothers Office held with the Lodge. For example, the square represents the Master of the Lodge and the dove represents the Deacon. Furthermore, a dedicated lodge jewel also indicates membership of a lodge. There are breast lodge jewels and neck lodge jewels.

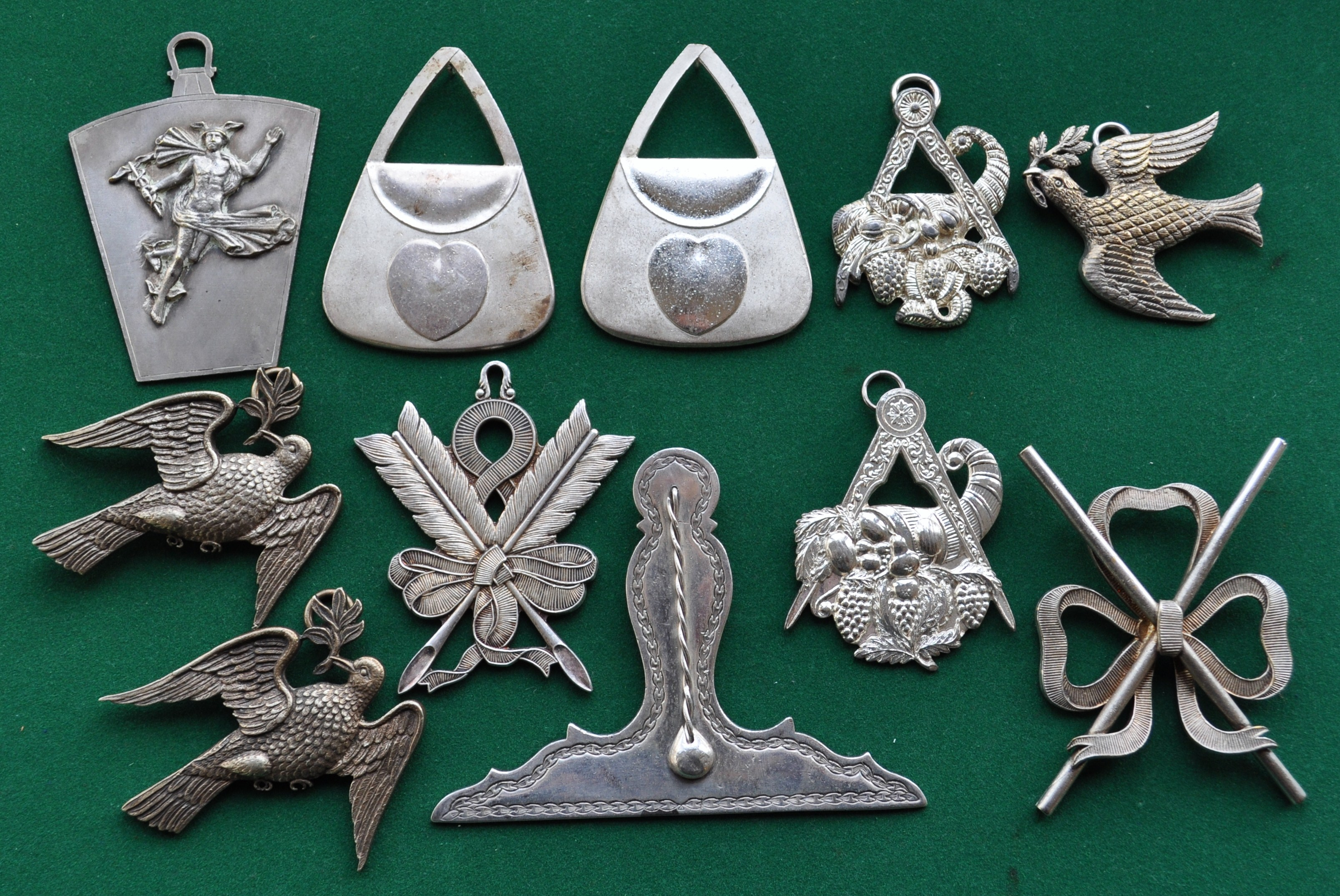
Types of masonic collar jewels

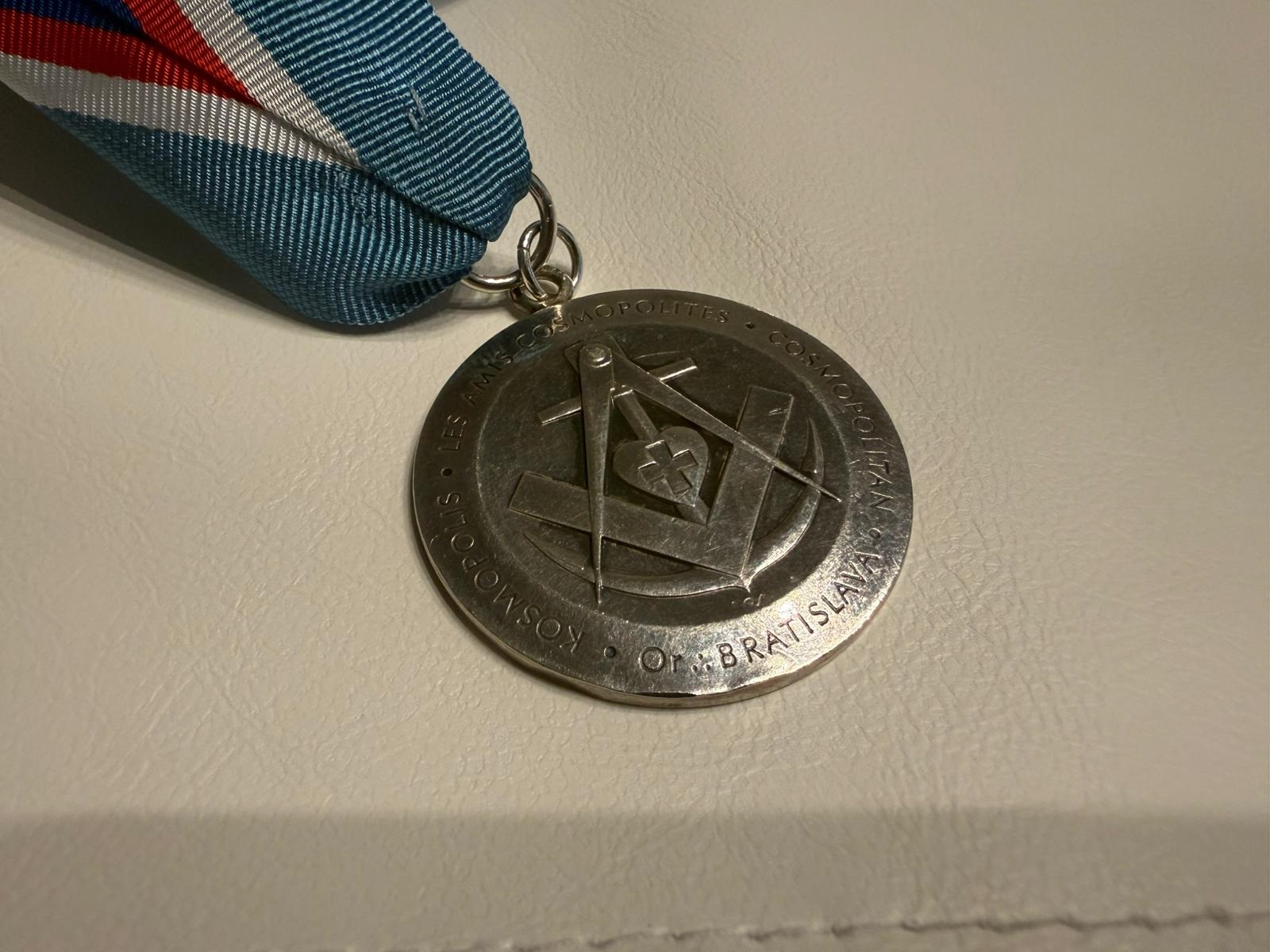
Jewel of Kosmopolis Lodge in Bratislava

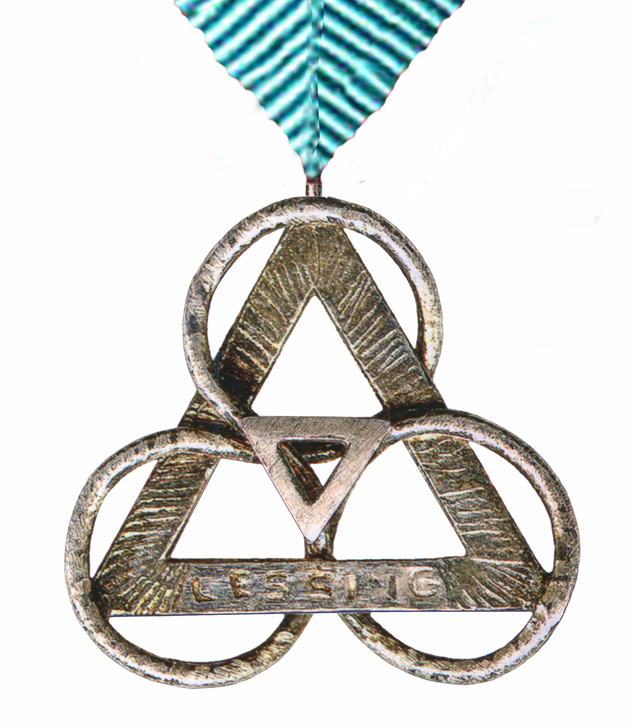
Historic jewel of the german lodge "Lessing zu den 3 Ringen"

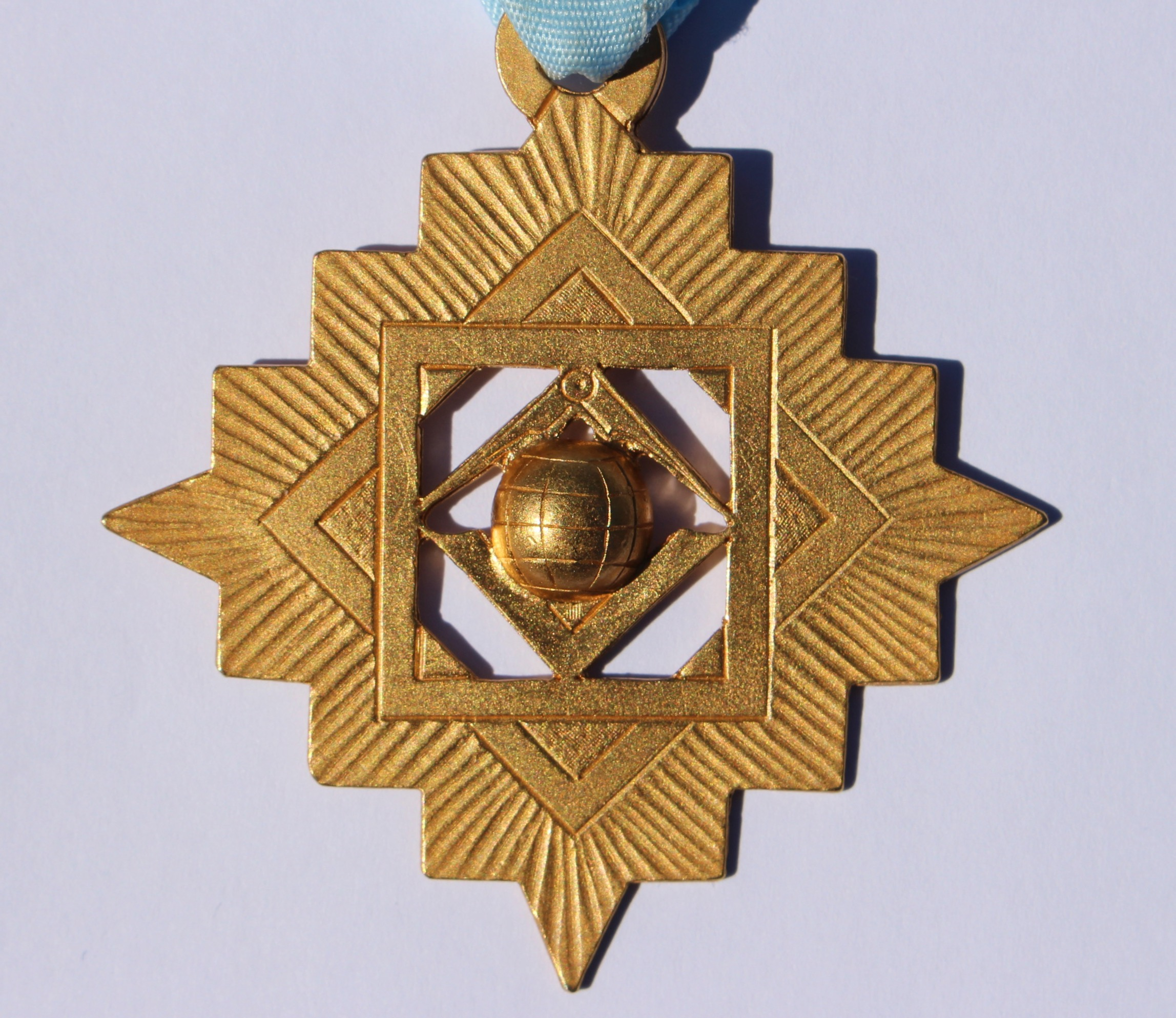
Jewel of the lodge "Zur Weltkugel" in Lübeck.

== Body modification ==
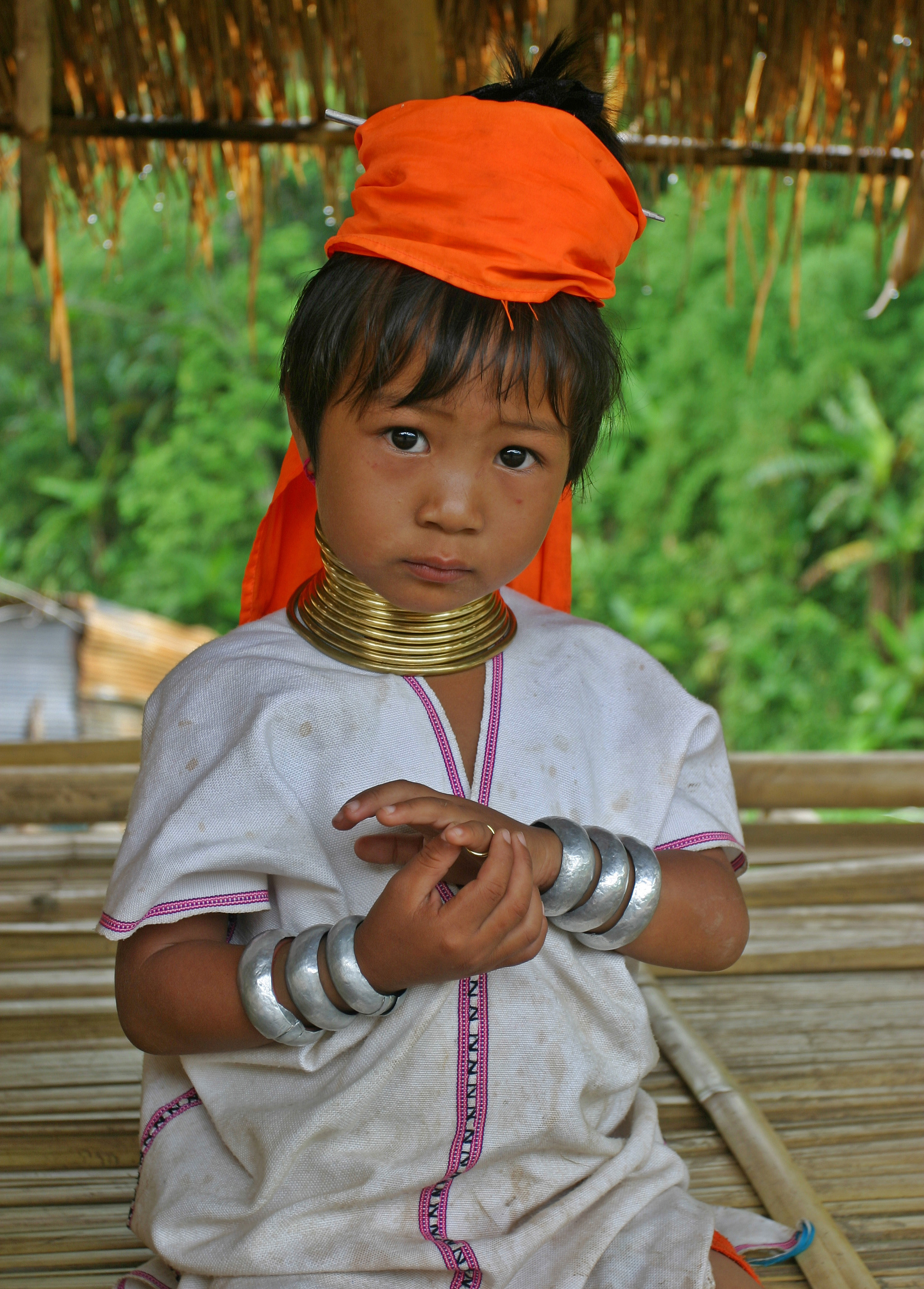
A Padaung girl in Northern Thailand

Jewellery used in body modification can be simple and plain or dramatic and extreme. The use of simple silver studs, rings, and earrings predominates. Common jewellery pieces such as earrings are a form of body modification, as they are accommodated by creating a small hole in the ear.

Padaung women in Myanmar place large golden rings around their necks. From as early as five years old, girls are introduced to their first neck ring. Over the years, more rings are added. In addition to the twenty-plus pounds of rings on her neck, a woman will also wear just as many rings on her calves. At their extent, some necks modified like this can reach 10–15 in (25–38 cm) long. The practice has health impacts and has in recent years declined from cultural norm to tourist curiosity. Tribes related to the Padaung, as well as other cultures throughout the world, use jewellery to stretch their earlobes or enlarge ear piercings. In the Americas, labrets have been worn since before first contact by Innu and First Nations peoples of the northwest coast. Lip plates have been worn by the African Mursi and Sara people, as well as some South American peoples.

In the late twentieth century, the influence of modern primitivism led to many of these practices being incorporated into western subcultures. Many of these practices rely on a combination of body modification and decorative objects, thus keeping the distinction between these two types of decoration blurred.

In many cultures, jewellery is used as a temporary body modifier; in some cases, with hooks or other objects being placed into the recipient's skin. Although this procedure is often carried out by tribal or semi-tribal groups, often acting under a trance during religious ceremonies, this practice has seeped into western culture. Many extreme-jewellery shops now cater to people wanting large hooks or spikes set into their skin. Most often, these hooks are used in conjunction with pulleys to hoist the recipient into the air. This practice is said to give an erotic feeling to the person and some couples have even performed their marriage ceremony whilst being suspended by hooks.

== Jewellery market ==
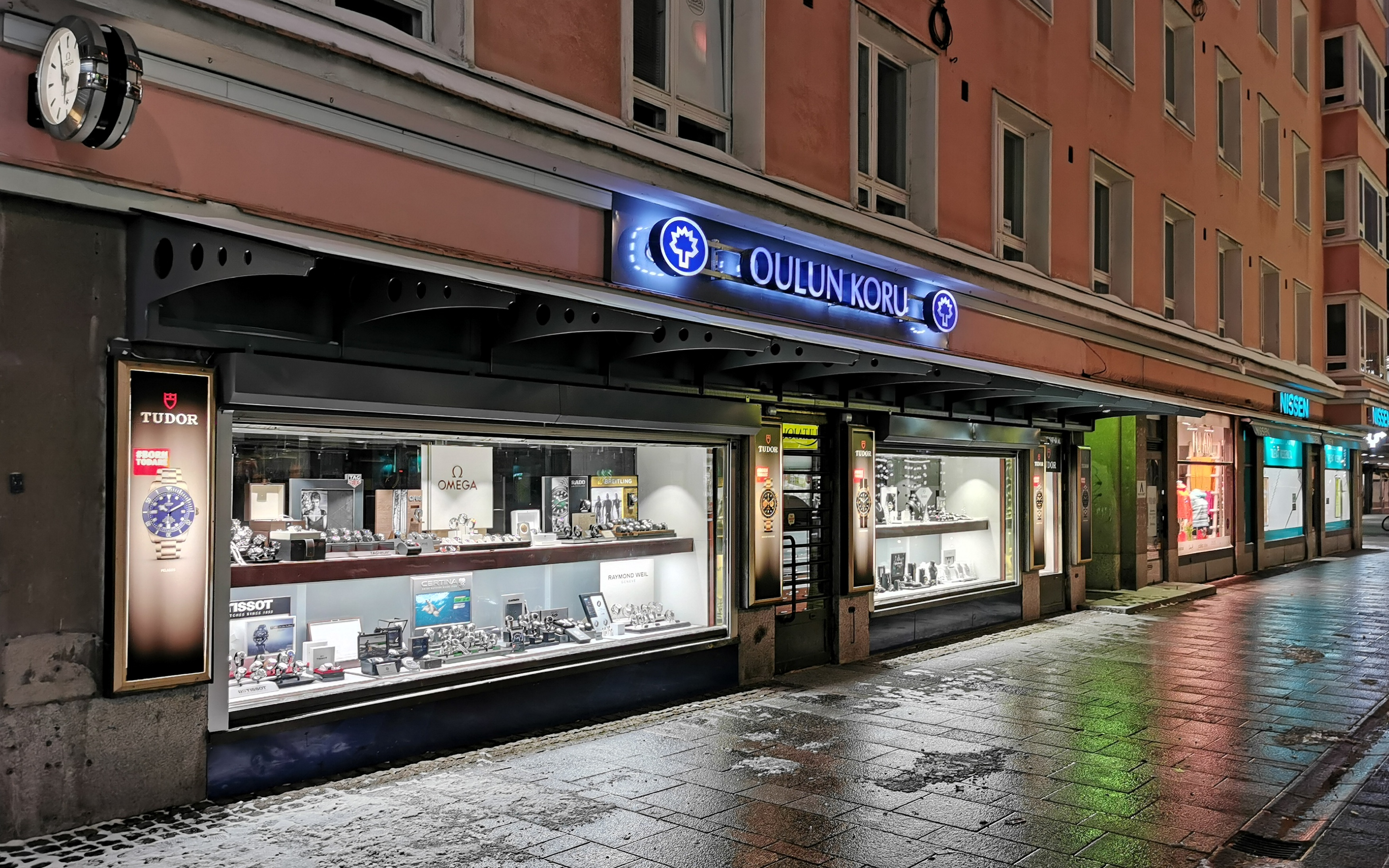
The Oulun Koru jewellery shop at the Kirkkokatu street in Oulu, Finland

The Asia Pacific region dominated the jewellery market with a market share of 39.28% in 2024. The global jewelry market size was valued at US$353.26 billion in 2023 and is expected to grow at a compound annual growth rate (CAGR) of 4.7% from 2024 to 2030.

As of 2022, the global jewellery market was valued at approximately $270 billion and is projected to grow to over $330 billion by 2026. In 2022, the leading countries in the jewellery and watch market revenue were China, India, and the United States.

The global jewellery market was valued at US$278.5 billion in 2018. India remains the largest consumer of gold globally, with gold demand rising by 11% year-on-year to 760.40 tonnes in 2018.

== See also ==
- Art jewelry
- Bronze and brass ornamental work
- Heirloom
- Gemology
- Jewellery cleaning
- Jewellery of the Berber cultures
- Jewellery Quarter
- Jewelry Television
- List of jewellery types
- List of topics characterized as pseudoscience (healing jewelry)
- List of names derived from gemstones
- Live insect jewelry
- Suffrage jewellery
- Wire sculpture
