= Phoenicus =

Phoenicus or Phoinikous (Ancient Greek: Φοινικοῦς) may refer to:

== Places ==
- Phoenicus (Cythera), a town of ancient Cythera, Greece
- Phoenicus (Ionia), a town of ancient Ionia, now in Turkey
- Phoenicus (Lycia), a town of ancient Lycia, now in Turkey
- Phoenicus (Messenia), a town of ancient Messenia, Greece
- Finike, modern Turkish town near the site of the Lycian Phoenicus

== Other uses ==
- Phoenicus (beetle), a genus of beetle

== See also ==
- Phoenician (disambiguation)
- Phoenicia (disambiguation)
- Phoenix (disambiguation)
