= Etruscan jewelry =

Aspect of the Etruscans

Jewelry of the Etruscan civilization existed in several eras.

== Villanovan Era ==
Very little jewelry from the Villanovan Era, an Early Iron Age culture dating c. 900 BC – 700 BC, has been discovered in modern times. The Villanovan Etruscans seem to have left few items of luxury, and thus appear modest. Yet extant Villanovan jewelry confirms that in Etruria great effort was placed in the production of decorative arts. Jewelry was a status symbol and indicated, then as now, wealth and prosperity.

Both pottery and jewelry from the Villanovan Era are decorated with swastikas, zigzags and triangles.

== Orientalizing Era ==
Gold jewelry started spreading rapidly during the Orientalizing era. It allowed a great deal more stylization and showed splendid workmanship. Geometric design was such a regular motif that archaeologists refer to this motif as the “Orientalizing geometric”.

An example of a piece of Etruscan gold jewelry: Gary Todd from Xinzheng, China - Etruscan Gold Jewelry

Etruscan gold jewelry especially flourished during the Orientalizing period due to the very affluent trading system which had evolved during this time. The Etruscans did not invent their decorative techniques. Indeed, the orientals influences had brought such techniques as granulation. Syro-Phoenician jewelers settled in southern Etruria and taught local apprentices the art of granulation and filigree.

These techniques first developed in the South of Etruria. It consisted of working designs onto a surface with tiny granules of gold. Care had to be taken not to melt the little granules onto the surface but instead, to solder them on with a tiny heated point. The various omissions and imperfections, made on purpose, gave the piece of jewelry the artistic character. Soldering was done using (most likely) arseniates and reducing the solder to an impalpable dust.

Syro-Phoenicians brought in other techniques of workmanship. Many jewelers were influenced by their recurrent themes and symbols. Sacred emblems like the solar disc and the half moon were incorporated in the Etruscans’ fast-growing repertoire. Later Etruscans loosened up their very stern geometric standards and added in their designs floral and figurative elements of oriental inspiration. The finest jewelry was still mainly centered and focused in the southern city-states such as; Cerveteri, Tarquinia and Vetulonia.

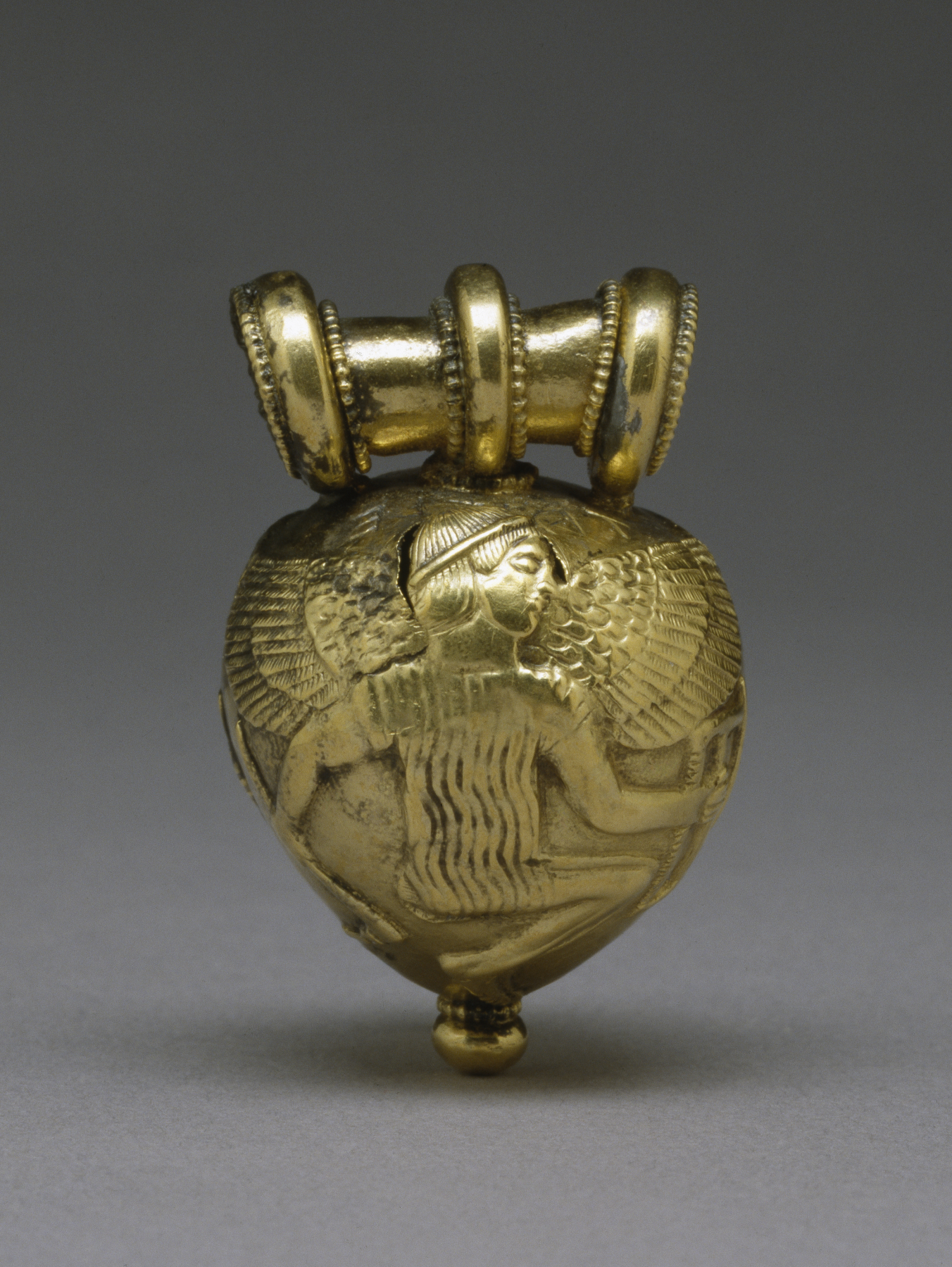
Etruscan Bulla with the Greek mythical figures Daedalus and Icarus. Walters Art Museum, Baltimore.

Gorgons, pomegranates, acorns, lotus flowers and palms were a clear indicator of Greek influence in Etruscan jewelry. The modelling of heads, which was a typical practice from the Greek severe period, was a technique that spread throughout the Etruscan territory. An even clearer evidence of new influences is the shape introduced in the Orientalizing era: The Bullae. A pear shaped vessel used to hold perfume. Its surface was usually decorated with repoussé and engraved symbolic figures.

Yet another motif in Etruscan jewelry is the Egyptian Scarab. In ancient Egyptian cultures it symbolized luck. It increased in Vulci and Tarquinia from the last decades of the 6th century BC.

In the northern city-states however, jewelry was more sober and refined pieces from Vetrulonia, for example, are decorated with minute particles known as pulviscolo (gold dust).

These practices came to them from the (at the time) distant Middle East, along with imported objects who inspired them to widen their range of jewelry. The Etruscans perfected these techniques, and in turn lead them to the very stylized jewelry of the 7th and 6th centuries. Often these pieces are considered the peak of their abilities.

Repoussé literally translated means to push back in French. The technique consists of hammering the design behind the ornament with the relief on the other style.

Granulation was the art of decorating smooth surfaces of gold jewelry with patterns composed of tiny granules of gold. It was invented in Mesopotamia in the third millennium BC and was subsequently introduced to Anatolia, Syria, Egypt, Cyprus and Mycenaean Greece. The collapse of the Bronze Age civilization brought with it the disappearance of such sophisticated arts in Greece, but they survived in the Near East and from there they were reintroduced in Greece in the 9th century and transferred to Italy during the second half of the 8th century.

Filigree is a decorative open work made from thin twisted wire mainly in silver and gold but also in other type of metals.

The most commonly used metal is copper in these cases. Most Etruscan jewelry is 18 karat gold but it varies - going as low as 15 karat. While pure gold is 24 karat, 18 and 15 karat gold benefit from their alloys. 18 karat gold is much more durable and harder than 24, and 15 karat is so much more durable and 'hard' than 18 karat. Some jewelry of the Regolini-Galassi tomb was too; thin, delicate and big to have been worn while more robust and less poutre gold ornamentation was solid enough to have been worn in life.

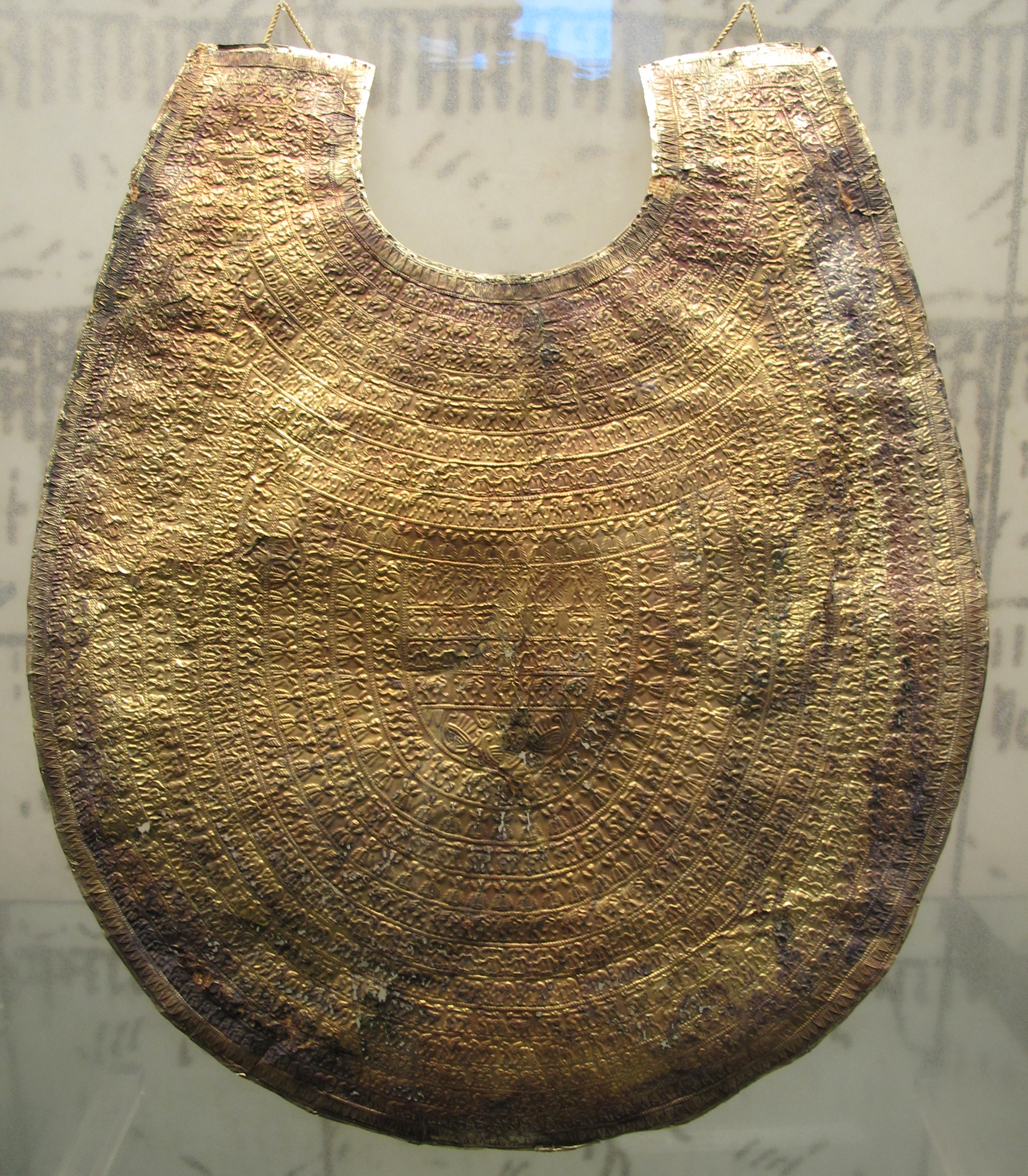
Material similar to the one used in the regolini-galassi tomb. Sailko (No changes made).

During this period, Etruscans laid gold over ivory or amber as a way to decorate their jewelry. Seen in rings, necklaces, and fibulae. Etruscans would also mold their gold and jewels into stone-carved molds.

== Archaic Era ==
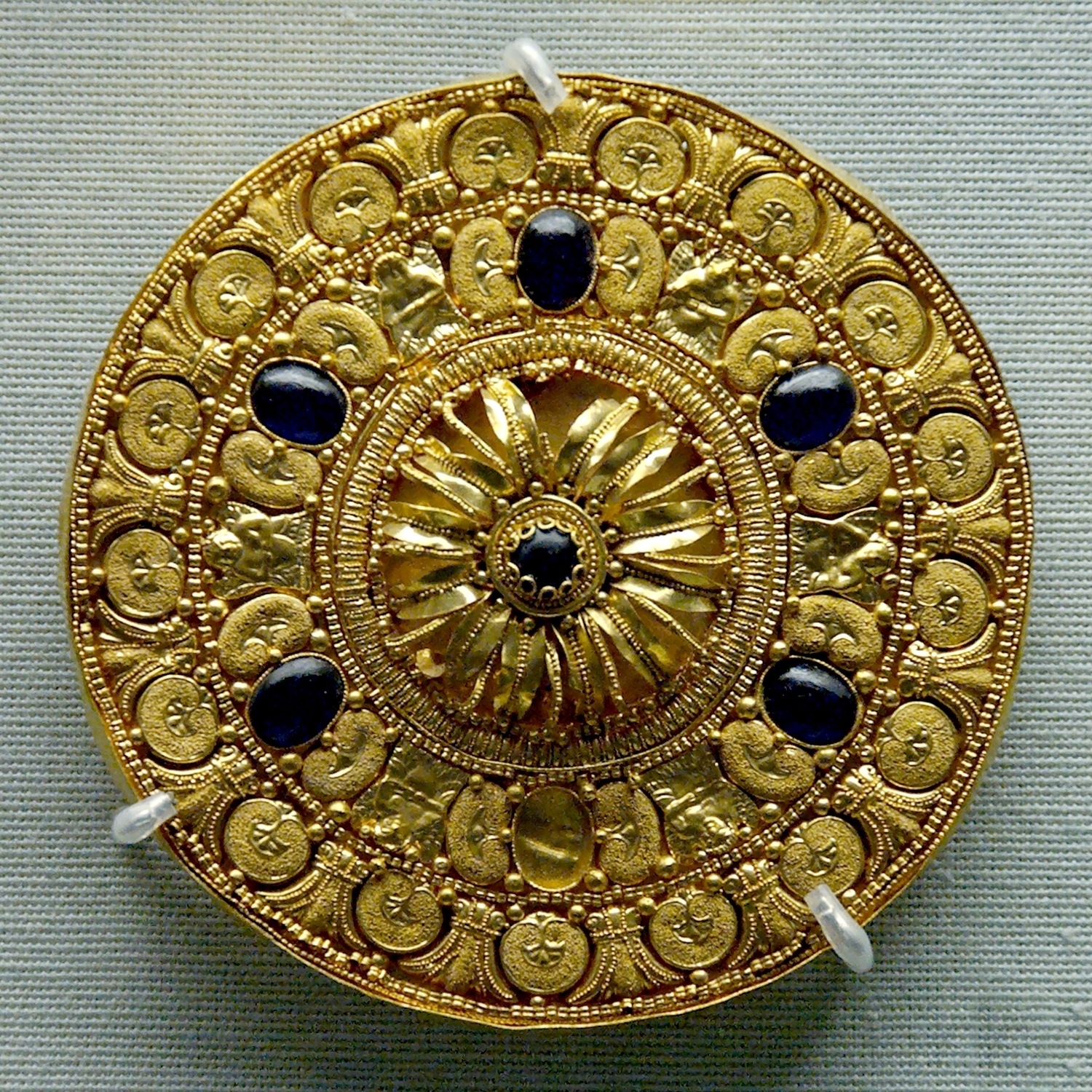
Ear-stud decorated with a rosette surrounded by concentric bands. Gold with vitreous glass paste insets, 530–480 BC. British Museum.

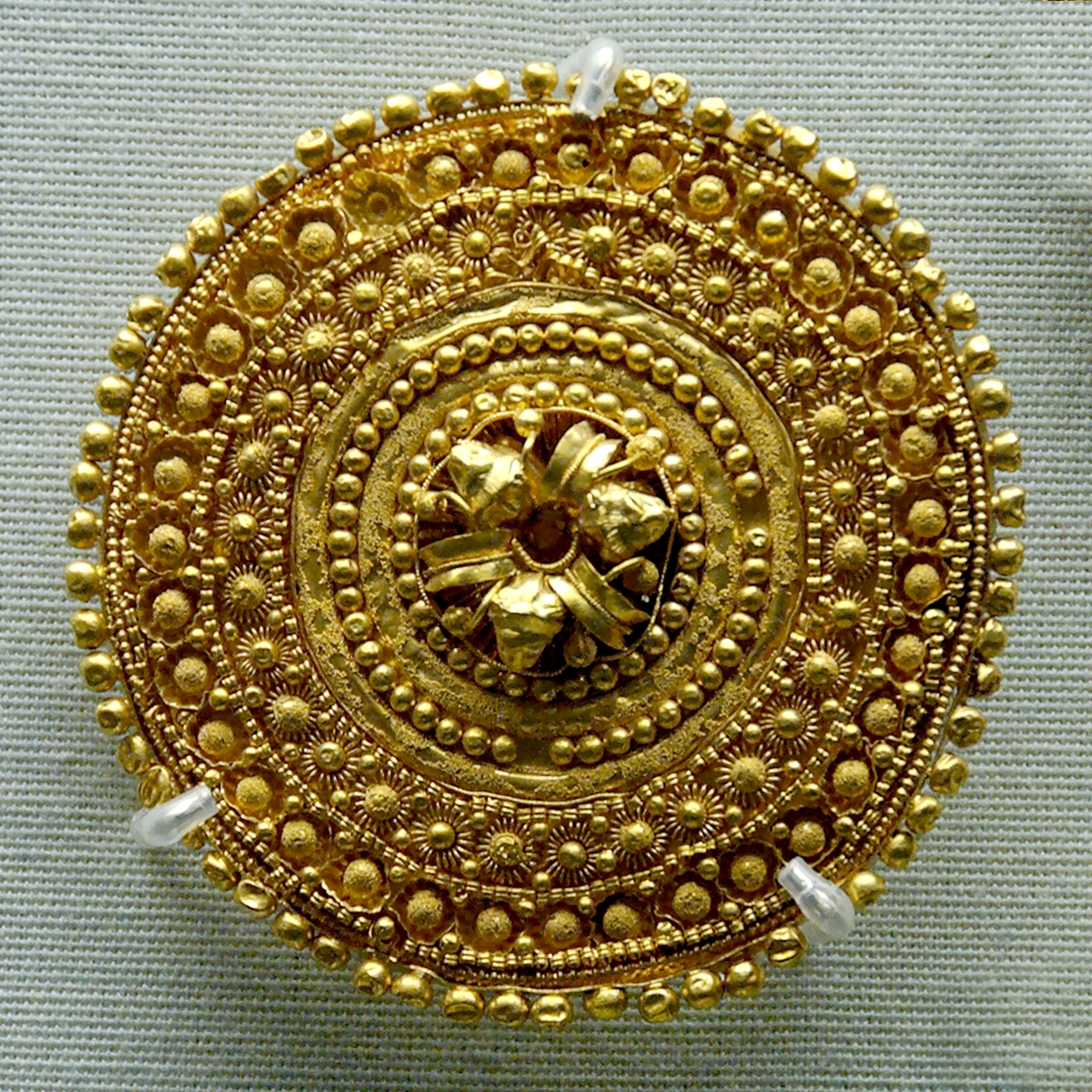
Ear-stud decorated with a rosette surrounded by concentric bands, globules and flowers. Gold with vitreous glass paste insets, 530–480 BC. British Museum.

Among the jewelry found in tombs of the Archaic period were large disc earrings. The techniques here are difficult to define but they actually used granulation in concentric patterns. They also used filigree and glass paste. This was probably a trend of the time as they have been found in several tombs. The disc earring is originally a Lydian type of jewelry and became a fashionable trend during the archaic period with the strong East Greek influence spreading in the second half of the 6th century BCE.

Valise-type earrings were mostly made in Vulci and were very widespread. The heavy pendants started becoming fashionable along with the Middle Eastern floral elements and all the other types of influence the Etruscans received from elsewhere in the Mediterranean.

The fibulae became an item closer to jewelry in the archaic period. During the Villanovan era they were mainly bronze. Progressively though they turned into a subject of ornament.

== Classical Era ==
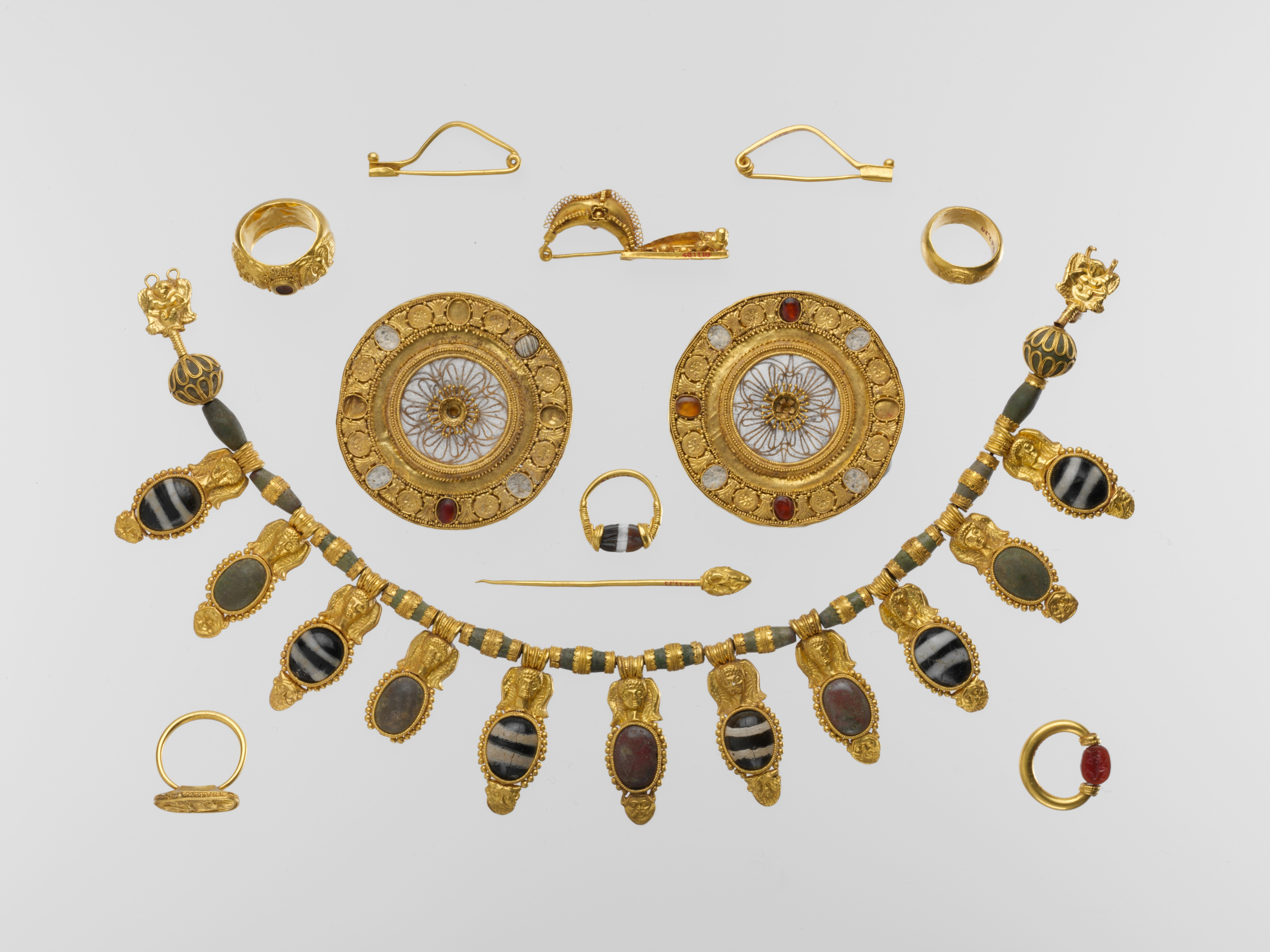
Vulci set of jewelry, 5th century, Metropolitan Museum of Art.

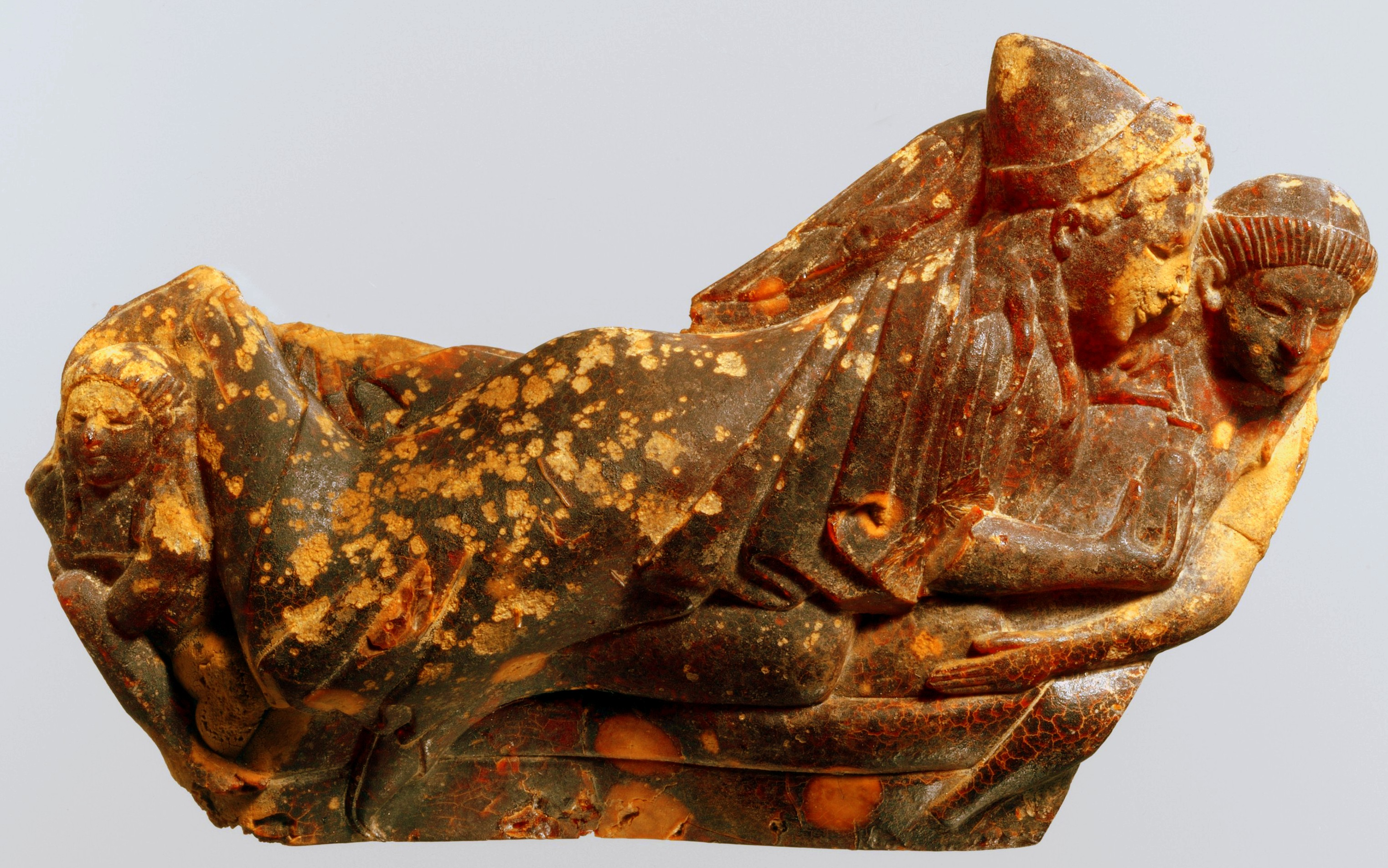
Morgan Amber fibula, 5th century, Metropolitan Museum of Art.

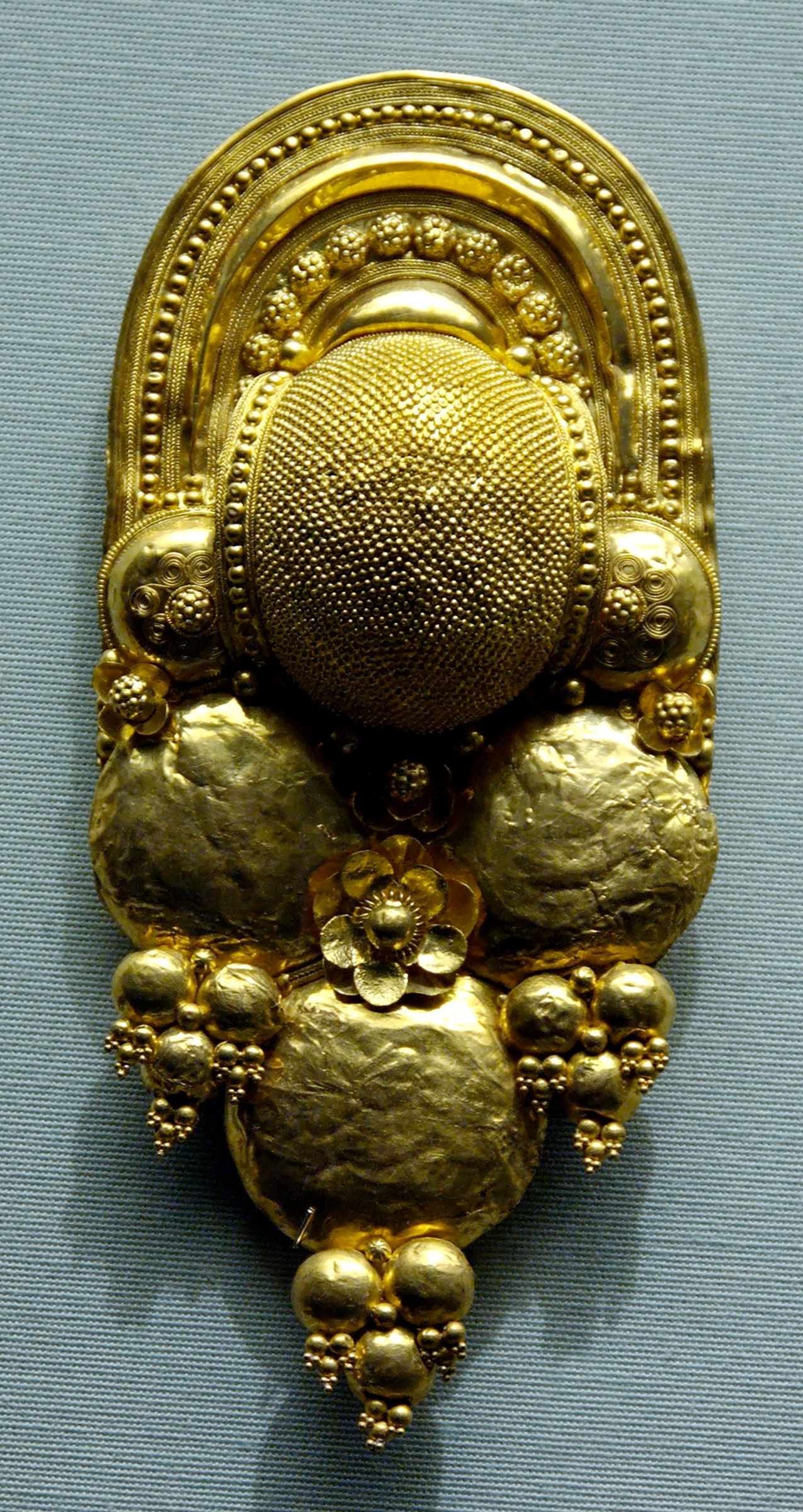
Earring decorated with bosses, globule clusters, rosettes and filigree. Stamped gold sheet, 400–300 BC. British Museum.

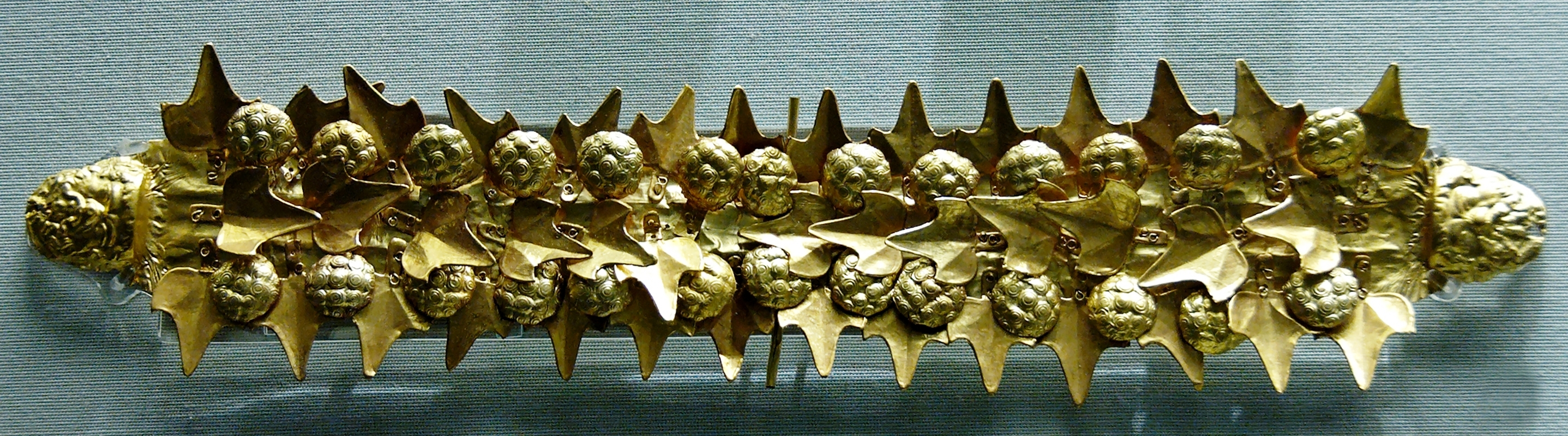
Wreath with ivy leaves and berries, a satyr's head at either end. Gold sheet, artwork, from a tomb near Tarquinia, 400–350 BC. British Museum.

Unfortunately the classical era was a period of crisis for the Etruscans. During the 5th century, Etruscan jewelry suffers a regression. Such techniques as filigree and granulation gradually disappeared. Others, like repoussé are used to decorate thin funerary bands, necklaces and lockets (or bullae). During this period, a different kind of earring comes into fashion: the grape cluster shaped earring. These kinds of earrings would cover the whole ear and sometimes hung down to the neck.

During the archaic period, "bigger was better". Large hanging earrings, long necklaces and heavy pendants or bullae were in style and worn by both men and woman alike. Women were heavily adorned and wore large diadems, bracelets and circlets, hair spirals, heavy earrings in the shape of grape clusters, large heavy pendants (also worn by men and children).

These were the fashion all throughout the 5th and 4th centuries. Necklaces were paired up with others. They would wear big necklaces with assorted beads, then another one with a big hanging pendant. Earrings with a long oval pendant and a smaller one hanging below were also very well received in the Etruscan community. In the early 3rd century, bead necklaces and bullae remain popular as do torcs, which were rings of color hair (of an animal) or feathers around the neck. In the late classical era body jewelry became more and more popular as the fashions tended towards a progressive state of undress. The body jewelry was the adornment of the body and was paired with other artifacts such as shoes, holding mirrors, etc.

== Hellenistic Era ==
These styles stayed popular throughout the Hellenistic period as well as the Roman period. During the Hellenistic periods, technical decline and excessively complex shapes and decoration characterized the jewelry.

Jewelry becomes omnipresent during the Hellenistic period. It becomes unisex and is worn by people whether they are naked or dressed. In images, women were often represented with only slippers and a torque or necklace. The heavy necklaces of the classical era are now replaced by strands of beads and torques. Jewelry was also used to display wealth and social status. The material of gold became especially popular. Jewelry makers used a lot of decorative elements such as beads and gemstones to create intricate pieces. Etruscans began wearing earrings, necklaces, hair pieces and rings showing how jewelry had become such a prominent part of life.
