= Bourtzi =

Bourtzi (Greek: Μπούρτζι, from Ottoman Turkish and Arabic برج - burc meaning "tower") may refer to a number of fortresses in Greece:

- Bourtzi (Nafplio), in the port of Nafplio, the most famous of them
- Bourtzi (Aegina), on an islet off Aegina
- Bourtzi (Aulis), a ruined castle near Aulis
- Bourtzi (Poros), on an island off Poros
- Bourtzi (Chalkis), a now demolished Venetian fortress at Chalkis
- Bourtzi (Methoni), at Methoni, Messenia
- Bourtzi (Karystos), at Karystos
