= Phoenicus Portus =

Phoenicus Portus or Limne Phoinikous (Ancient Greek: λιμὴν Φοινικοῦς) may refer to:

- Phoenicus (Cythera), a harbour town of ancient Cythera
- Phoenicus (Messenia), a harbour town of ancient Messenia
