= Boule de Genève =

Type of watch

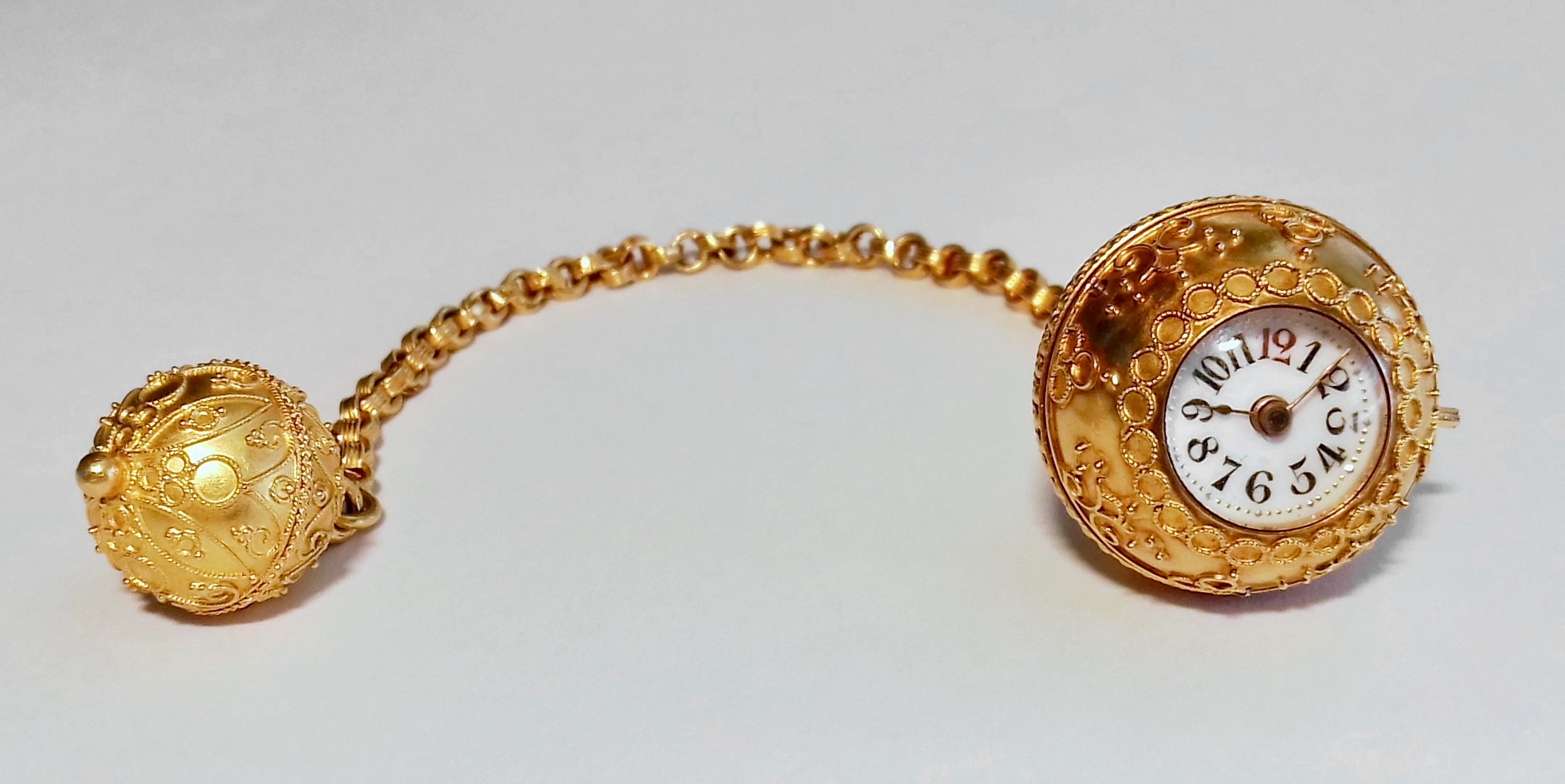
A Boule de Genève in the Etruscan revival style with granulation and wirework decoration, unsigned, Switzerland, c. 1890, 21.5k yellow gold. Lecoultre winding system. It is unusual to find a ball-charm matching the ball watch. Watch Museum of Le Locle (Switzerland).

A Boule de Genève (Geneva ball) is a type of pendant watch in the shape of a small ball or sphere originating from Geneva, (Switzerland). The dial is usually at the bottom of the sphere facing the floor, at the opposite side of the jump ring on the upper part of the sphere, although there are examples with a front view face. Usually, they were arabic numeral dials, sometimes Roman, and from the 1950s different types of hour markers were also used. This objet de vertu frequently came with a matching brooch, chain or chatelaine.

The term Boule de Genève is generic and does not mean that a given watch was necessarily made in the city or Canton of Geneva. Likewise, it should not be confused with another Swiss pendant watch also in spherical form, with a front view dial and magnifying dome-shaped glass at the front and back of the timepiece, the so-called bubble watch.

Geneva balls were crafted in different sizes, styles, materials and decorative techniques, such as gold, silver, other metals, guilloché enamel, enamel, cloisonné, adorned with diamonds, pearls, etc. They were intended as an accessory mainly for women.

Many of the early "balls" were unsigned, though others retailed by jewellery companies such as Cartier, Tiffany's, or Van Cleef & Arpels, and others marketed by watch brands.

== History ==
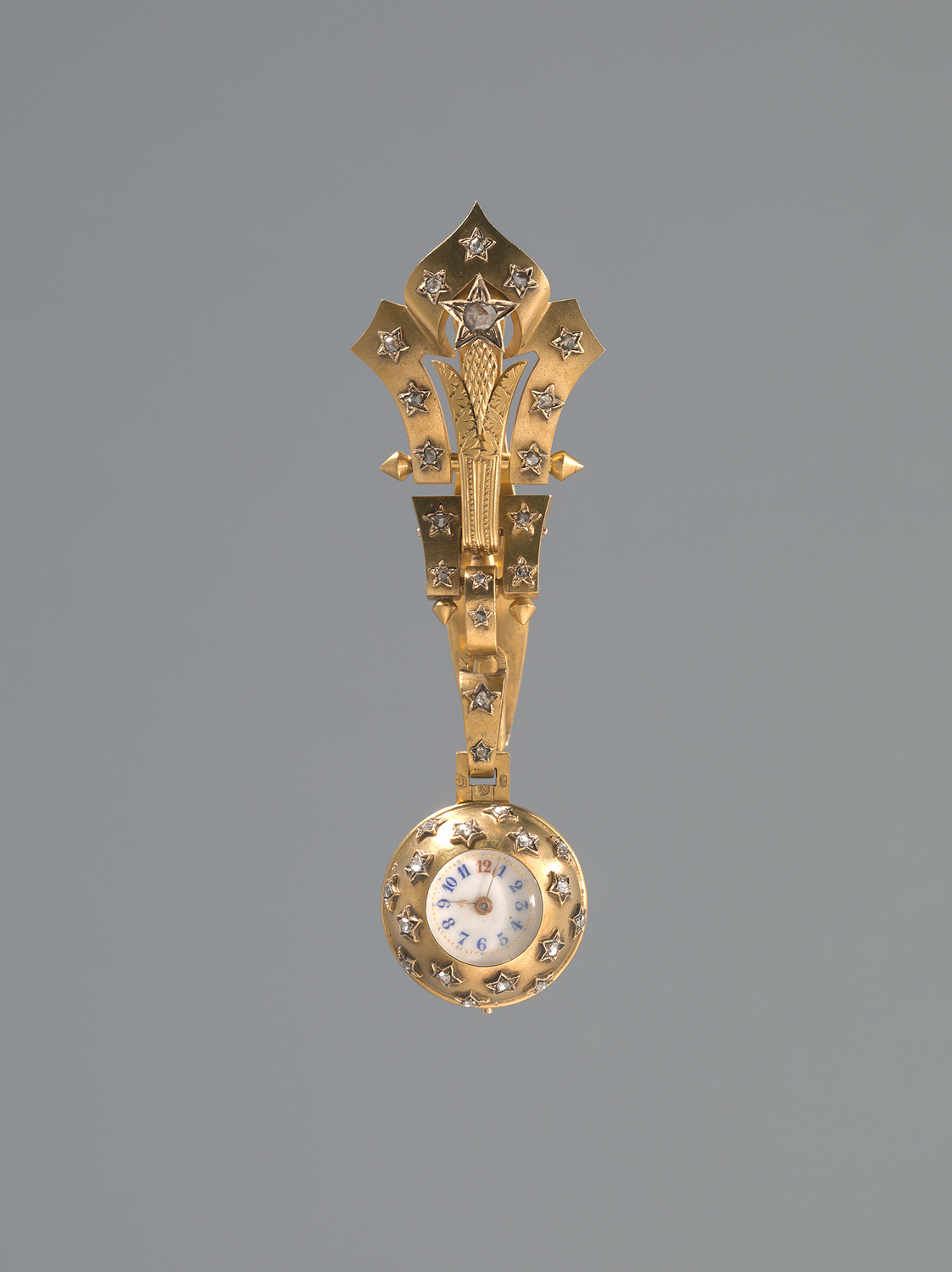
A front view dial example hanging from a matching gold chatelaine, ball decorated with stars enclosing diamonds. Unsigned, Switzerland, Lecoultre winding system. Amsterdam Museum

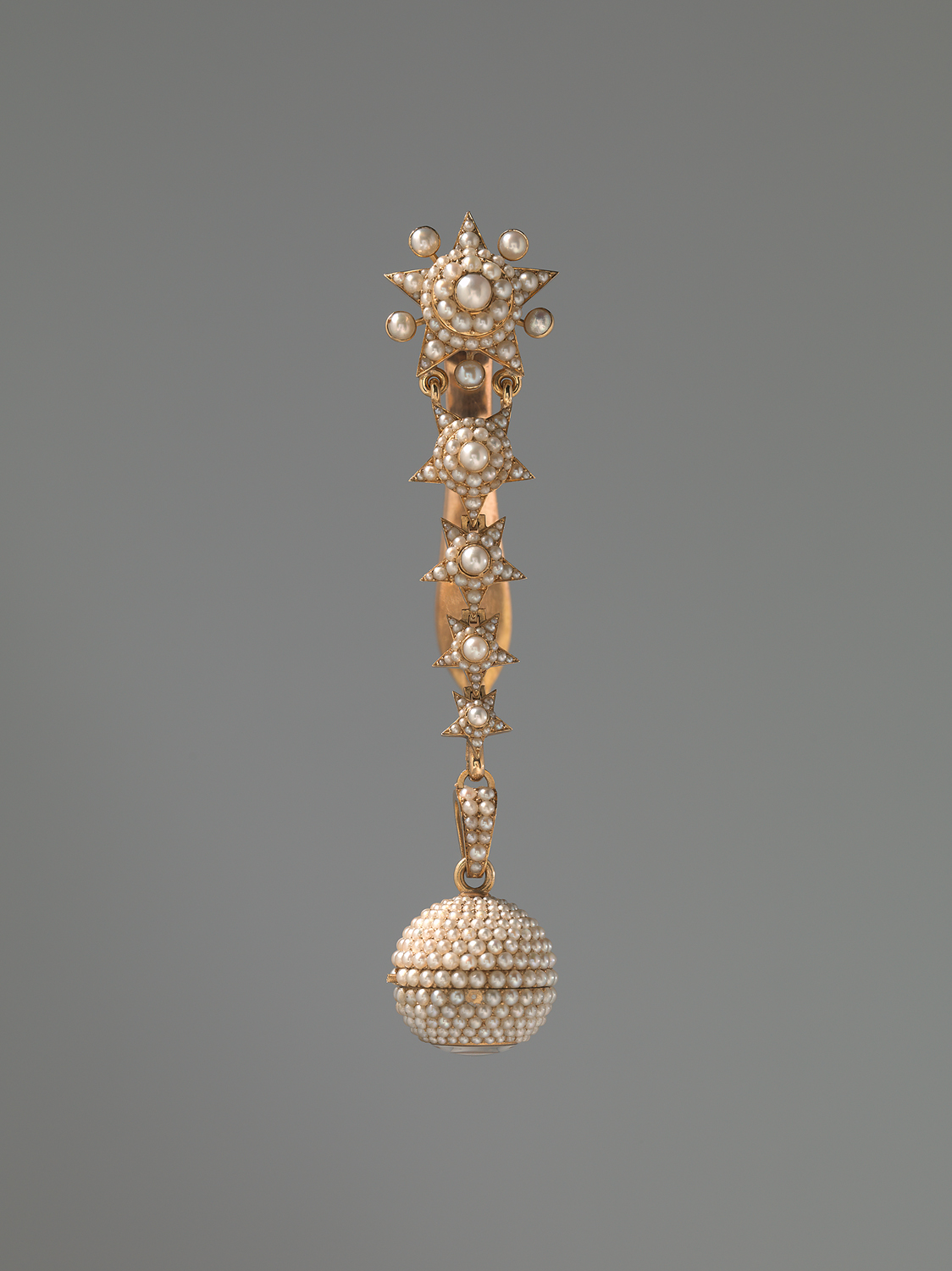
Gold sphere covered in pearls with matching chatelaine, dial facing the floor. Unsigned, Switzerland, Lecoultre winding system. Amsterdam Museum

The first boules de Genève date from the 1860s, marketed by firms such as Patek Philippe from 1866. They featured the winding mechanism invented by Marius Lecoultre (1847–1915) of Geneva and patented in Switzerland in 1889 (the Swiss patent office was not created until 1888). Winding by rotating the hemisphere containing the dial and time setting by pressing the protruding, cylindrical-shaped button at one side of the orb while turning the said hemisphere clockwise or counter clockwise. These watches have no key and crown. Lecoultre's winding system was also used in some ring watches and wristwatches of the time, like for example in an 1889 Vacheron Constantin wristwatch, which is operated by rotating the bezel.

In the 1878 Paris Exposition Universelle, Patek Philippe devoted a showcase to these ball-form timepieces. And years later sold pieces to royalty such as Sultan Hussein Kamel of Egypt in 1887 and Empress Teresa of Brazil in 1888.

At the 1893 Chicago World's Columbian Exposition, several exhibitors displayed these types of watches among their horological products, called "globes" in the "Report of the Committee on Awards of the World's Columbian Commission":

- Eugène Clémence-Beurret, Chaux-de-Fonds: (...) and globes incrusted with diamonds, rubies, pearls, and enamels, in the most artistic manner.
- C. Degallier, Geneva: A magnificent collection of chatelaine and bijou watches, small watches in bracelets, tiny globes (...).
- Marius Lecoultre, Geneva: (...) chatelaine watches in the form of globes and other fanciful designs (...).
- G. Jeanneret & E. Vrocher, Chaux-de-Fonds: (...) watches in very small globes (...).
- F. Borgel, Geneva: A number of the smallest watches made, beautifully decorated with diamonds and enamels, in small globes, bracelets, and chatelaines (...).

A different winding and setting system was invented by Ariste Bourquard of Bienne and patented in Switzerland in 1907, this system did not require a crown and a key either.

At least from the First World War, these types of pendant watches were fitted with a winding crown. For example, there are several Rolex "balls" dating from that period.

The small watch continued to be manufactured in the following decades, enjoying a revival in popularity in the 1960s, judging by the number of brand names that existed and pieces available. They are distinguishable by their dials having stamped, printed and/or applied different types of indices; baton, stick, round, arrow, etc.

In the 1970s, quartz movements were introduced in these timepieces for the first time.
