= Young Knight in a Landscape =

Painting by Vittore Carpaccio

- Artist: Vittore Carpaccio
- Year: 1510
- Medium: Oil on canvas
- Dimensions: 218 cm × 152 cm (86 in × 60 in)
- Location: Thyssen-Bornemisza Museum, Madrid

Young Knight in a Landscape, or Portrait of a Knight, is an oil on canvas painting by the Italian Renaissance artist Vittore Carpaccio, now in the Thyssen-Bornemisza Museum in Madrid. Dated 1510, this is the earliest full-length portrait in Western painting—on the assumption that it is a portrait, as it seems likely. It is characteristic of Carpaccio that apart from this important innovation, the style of the work seems in other respects to look back to the previous century. From some time until the 20th century the painting had been given the monogram of Albrecht Dürer, and Carpaccio's signature had been overpainted. The realism and detail of Carpaccio does in fact show Northern influence.

== Composition ==
The painting shows a young knight, surrounded by a rather crowded series of symbols. The heron caught in the sky by a hawk might hint at this knight's death in battle, also alluded to by his posture, which recalls that of a funerary statue; an alternative theory is that this is a memorial portrait of a person already dead. The other knight with a lance might then be the same person during his life. Alternatively, the figure on horseback might be his page; the page of a knight occasionally appears in portraits wearing his master's helmet and having his gauntlets on his person, ready to supply both when called upon, which seems to have been an actual practice. Two later examples are Titian's portrait of Alfonso d'Avalos, and a portrait by Paris Bordone of a man in armour with two pages (now Metropolitan Museum of Art, New York). In the left lower corner is a white ermine and a scroll stating "I prefer to die rather than to incur dishonour" (malo mori quam foedari). The symbolism of these and the other animals and plants have been much discussed by art historians.

== Subject identity ==
For centuries the identity of the knight has been a subject of discussion among the most renowned art historians, including Bernard Berenson and Lionello Venturi. The portrait is now considered most likely to show Francesco Maria I della Rovere, the Duke of Urbino and nephew of Pope Julius II, during whose reign it was painted. Nevertheless, a more recent interpretation identifies the knight as the Venetian patrician Marco Gabriel, who was rector of the fortress of Methoni, in Greece, during the Ottoman siege of 1500. His family would have commissioned the painting as a tribute to his memory, as, being the only Venetian survivor of the siege, he had been accused of cowardice. Taken by the Ottomans to Constantinople, he was beheaded there on 4 November 1501.

== Owners ==
The painting was sold by the heirs of the American collector Otto Kahn after his death and bought by Heinrich Thyssen in 1935.

== Details ==
Details
