= Phoenicia (disambiguation) =

Phoenicia, or Phœnicia, was an ancient civilization in the north of Canaan in parts of Lebanon, Syria, and Palestine.

Phoenicia may also refer to:

== Historical places ==
- Phoenice (Roman province), a province of the Roman Empire encompassing the region of Phoenicia
- Phoenice, a Greek city in Albania
- Finike, a Turkish district historically named Phoenicus
- Phoenicus (Lycia)
- Foinikas, Cyprus

== Modern places ==
- Phoenicia, New York, a New York village
- Phoenicia station, a train station in Phoenicia, New York
- Phoenicia Hotel Beirut, a hotel in Beirut, Lebanon
- Hotel Phoenicia, a hotel in Floriana, Malta

== Other ==
- Phoenicia (periodical), a Montreal-based Lebanese pan-Arab publication
- Phoenicia Rogerson (born 1996), British author
- Phoenicia, official name of star HD 192263, in the constellation of Aquila

== See also ==
- Phoenician (disambiguation)
- Syria Phoenicia (disambiguation)
- Phoenicus (disambiguation)
- Phoenix (disambiguation)
