= Foinikounta =

Village in Messenia, Greece

Foinikounta Φοινικούντα
- Community
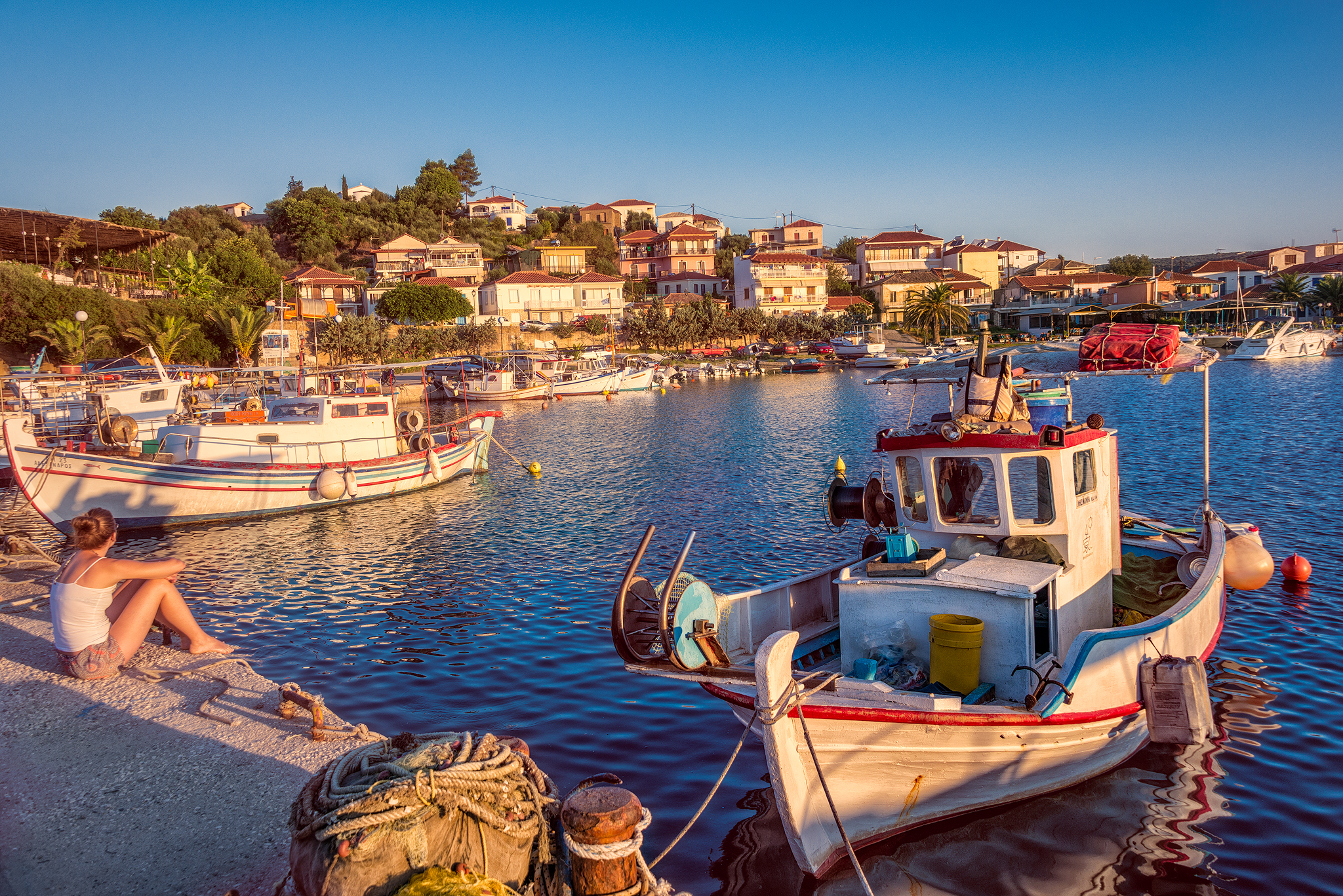

- Location within Greece
- Coordinates: 36°48.5′N 21°48.4′E
- Country: Greece
- Administrative region: Peloponnese
- Regional unit: Messenia
- Municipality: Pylos-Nestor
- Municipal unit: Methoni
- Village established: 1840s
- Elevation: 19 m (62 ft)

Population (2021)
  - Community: 573
- Time zone: UTC+2 (EET)
  - Summer (DST): UTC+3 (EEST)
- Postal code: 240 06

Foinikounta (Greek: Φοινικούντα, before 1930: Ταβέρνα - Taverna), also known transliterated as Finikounda or Finikounta, is a seaside village and a community in the municipality of Pylos-Nestor, Messenia, Greece. It is situated in the southwestern tip of the Peloponnese peninsula, 9 km east of Methoni and 37 km southwest of Kalamata. It is most notable for its beautiful beaches which attract mostly Greek and other European visitors during the summer months. The community consists of the main village Foinikounta, the small villages Anemomylos, Chounakia, Grizokampos and Loutsa, and the island of Schiza.

== Population ==
| Year | Village | Community |
|---|---|---|
| 1981 | 519 | - |
| 1991 | 588 | - |
| 2001 | 559 | 626 |
| 2011 | 592 | 677 |
| 2021 | 500 | 573 |

== History ==
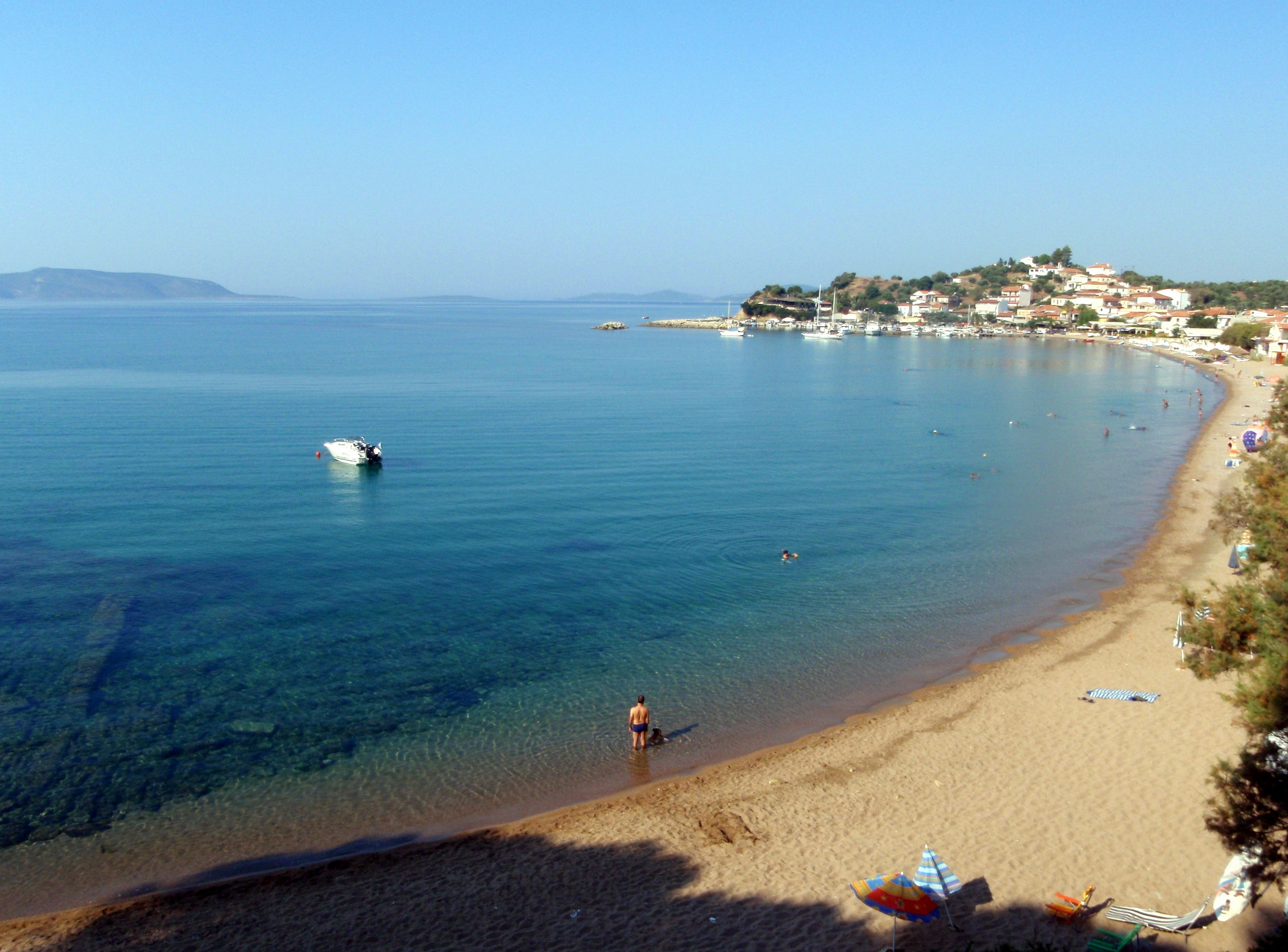
Finikounta

It is believed to have been founded by the Phoenicians. The ancient town Phoenicus (Φοινικούς) was mentioned by Pausanias as a port west of Cape Akritas. It is believed that it was a small commercial port where the fishers of murex trunculus (a sea snail from which a known indigo dye is produced) could trade their product and has vanished in our days. The name most likely refers to the sea snail that the Greeks called Phoenikus (Φοινικούς).

The present village was founded in the 1840s by inhabitants of Lachanada, that had fled from Crete and Arcadians from Crisovitsi. It was initially called Taverna, after a tavern in the village. It received its present name in 1930. The main resources of the inhabitants are agriculture and tourism, which has flourished since the 1980s. Each of the three long sandy beaches in Foinikounta has been rated a Red Flag beach.

== See also ==
- List of settlements in Messenia
