= Bourtzi Castle =

Venetian castle and fortress in Nafplio, Greece

Bourtzi
- Μπούρτζι
- Part of Fortifications of Nafplio
- Nafplio, Peloponnese, Greece
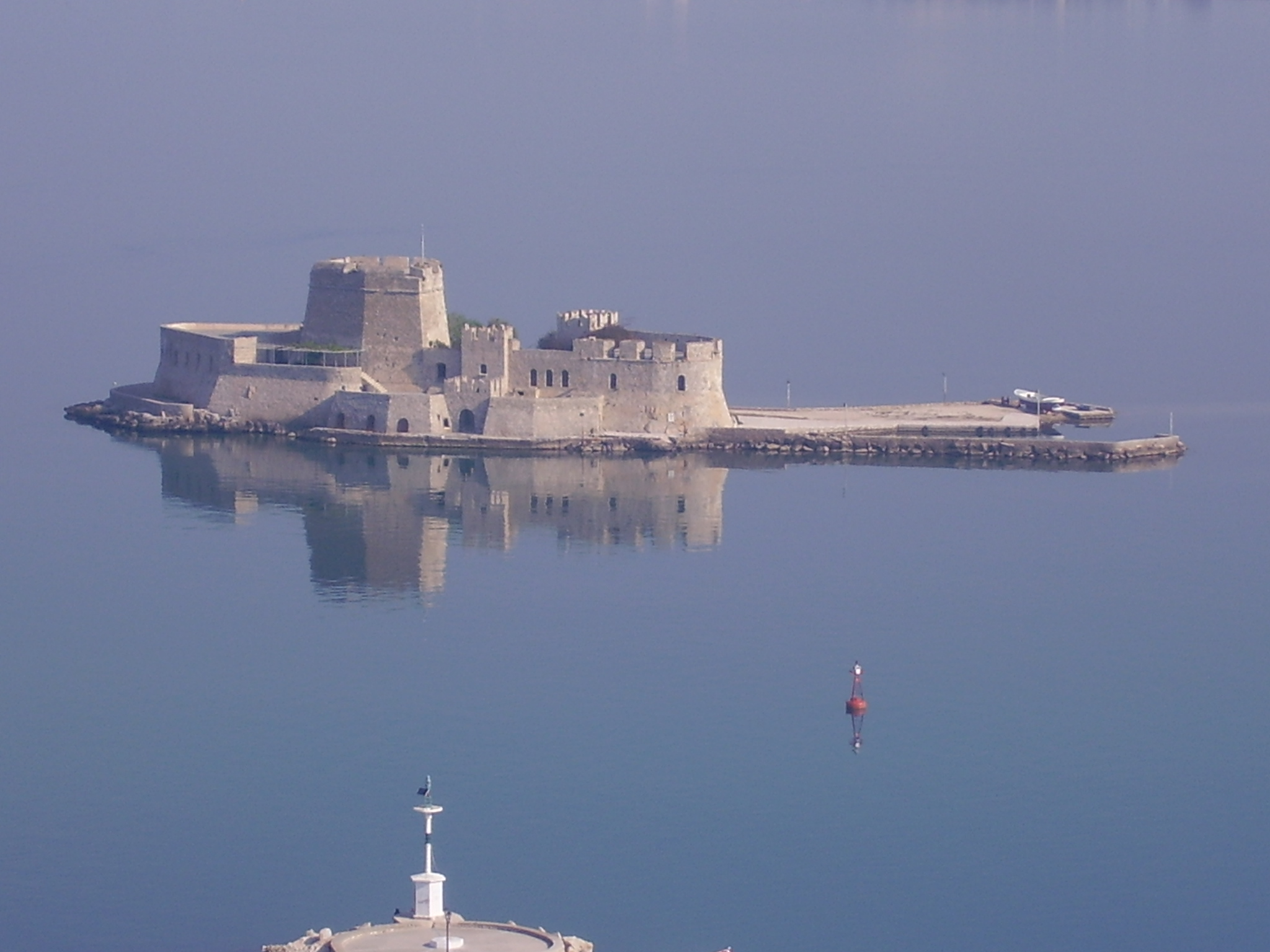
- Bourtzi Castle

Site information
- Type: Island castle, citadel
- Owner: Greek Ministry of Culture
- Controlled by: Republic of Venice 1473–1540; Ottoman Empire 1540–1685; Republic of Venice 1685–1715; Ottoman Empire 1715-1821
- Open to the public: Yes
- Condition: Intact

Location
- Coordinates: 37.3411°N 22.4725°E

Site history
- Built: 1473
- Materials: hewn stone (ashlar)

The water castle of Bourtzi (Greek: Μπούρτζι, from Ottoman Turkish برج - burc meaning "tower"; formerly Καστέλλι, Kastelli or Πασσάζ, Passaz) is a Venetian castle located in the middle of the harbour of Nafplio.

== History ==
It was built by Antonio Gambello, an Italian architect from Bergamo in 1471, although the construction was completed by the engineer Brancaleone.

This fortress was constructed by the Venetians after the departure of Mahmut Pasha in 1473, and equipped with cannons. In 1502, the Venetians changed the fortifications on the southwest side into an independent rampart and erected an artificial mound of boulders to which they attached a chain. The chain was then connected to the city to prevent hostile ships from entering the harbour.

After the Treaty of Karlowitz (1699), the Venetians erected a sturdy tower and bastions with cannons on the islet, thus creating the well-known fortress that dominates the entrance to the port of Nafplio today.

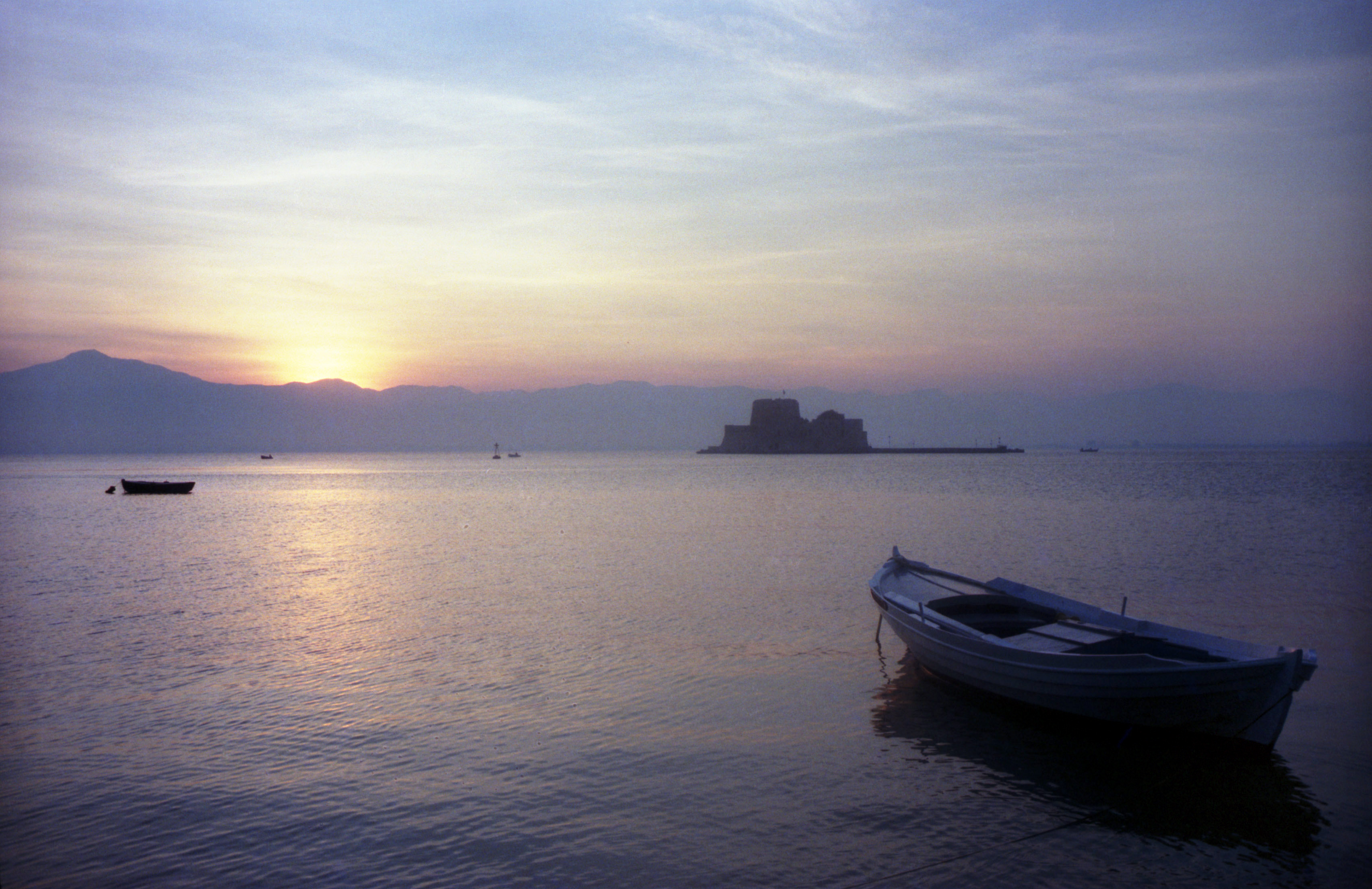
Bourtzi at sunset, Nafplion

During the Greek revolution of 1821, the castle was captured by 200 armed soldiers. The castle was then used to bombard Nafplion and managed to thwart the resupply of the besieged Turks from an English ship.

In the following decade, during the Greek civil war (1823–1833), the Greek government was twice forced to take refuge in the castle, on May 25, 1824, and on July 2, 1827.

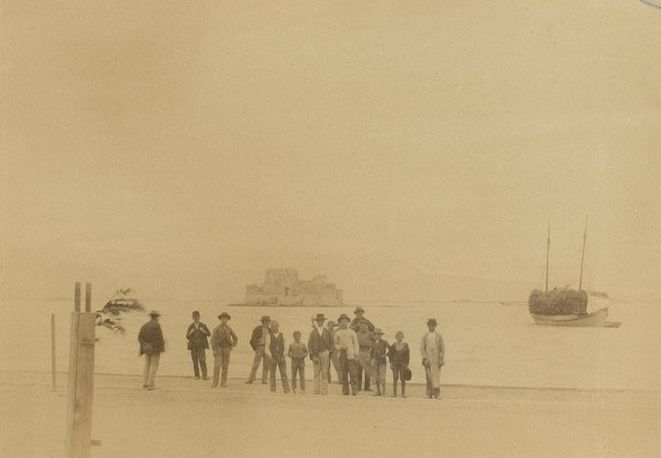
View from Bourtzi in 1892.

By order of the newly arrived King George I, the castle was disarmed in 1865 and became the residence of the city's executioner and the location of for executing prisoners via guillotine.

Finally, with the creation of the Greek National Tourism Organisation, the castle was restored in the 1930s, and was transformed into one of the first tourist centers in Greece. The castle then housed a hotel with 12 rooms and a restaurant that was mentioned in contemporary international travel guides. It operated continuously from the 1930s until the Greek junta took power and closed the hotel and restaurant. Footage from its time as a hotel can be seen in the 1958 film The Man on the Train directed by Dinos Dimopoulos.

The castle has been since restored as a tourist attraction for the city of Nafplio.

== See also ==
- Bourtzi (disambiguation)
