= Syria Phoenicia =

Syria Phoenicia (also Syro-Phoenicia, adjectival Syro-Phoenician) may refer to:

- Phoenicia under Hellenistic rule
- Phoenicia under Roman rule
  - Phoenice (Roman province) (c.194–630s)
- Syro-Phoenicians, the ethnic Canaanite population of southern Roman Syria
  - The biblical Syrophoenician woman (Mark 7:26)

== See also ==
- Phoenicia (disambiguation)
- Achaemenid Phoenicia
- History of Lebanon
- Syro-Hittite
