= Vulci set of jewelry =

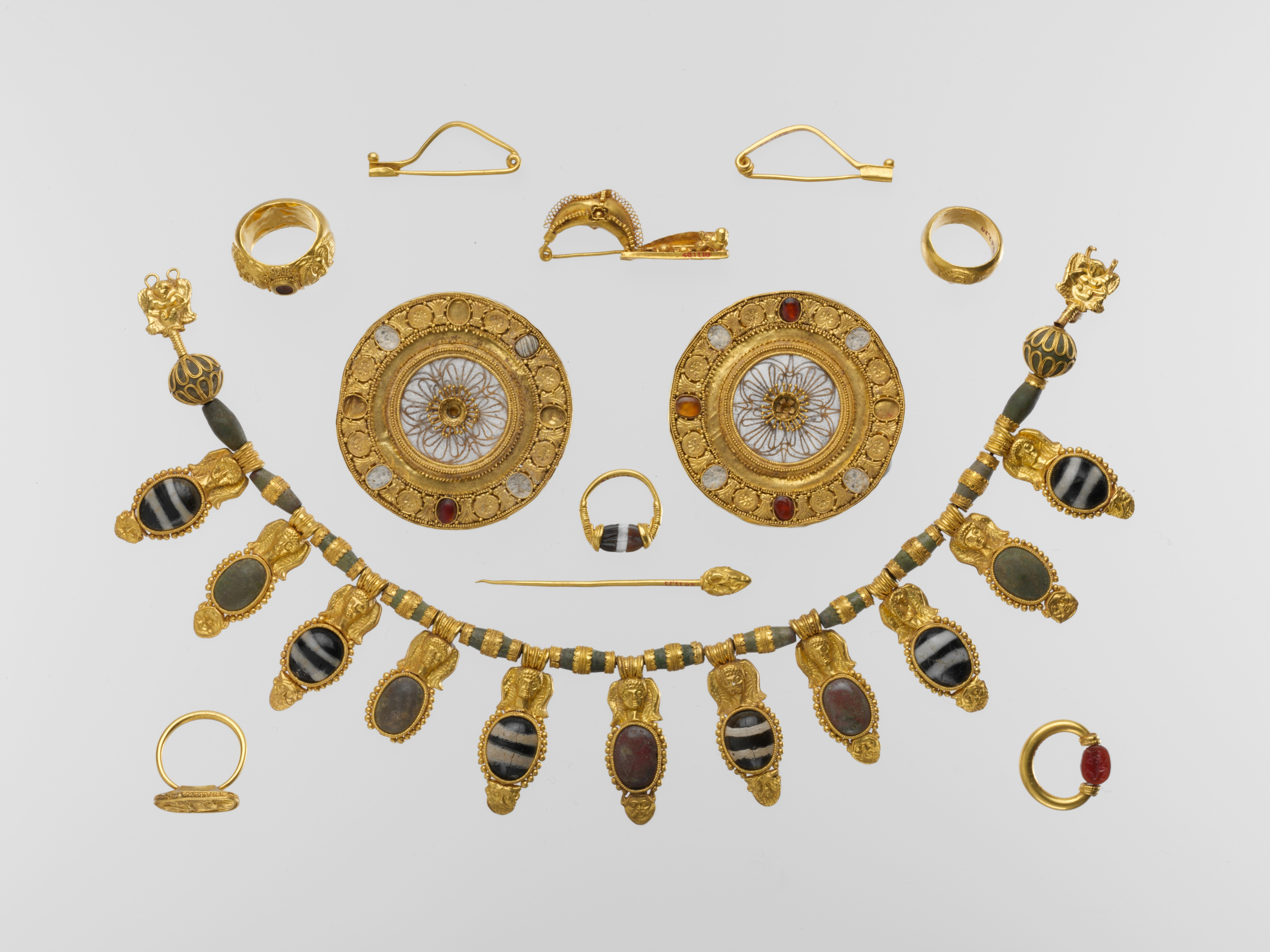
- Year: 5th century BCE
- Location: Metropolitan Museum of Art
- Accession: 40.11.7–.18

The Vulci set of jewelry, also known as the Vulci group, is a set of 5th century BCE Etruscan metalwork collection by an unknown jeweler. It is in the collection of the Metropolitan Museum of Art.

The history of the set is unknown. It was discovered in a two chamber tomb in the ancient site of Vulci in 1832. The burial featured a two chamber tomb of a man and woman, who were most likely married in life.

== Description ==
The Vulci group is a set made of ten pieces of jewelry: a pair of earrings, a necklace, three fibulae, and five rings. The necklace itself is made of eleven pendents that are attached to tube shaped beads. Depicted on the pendants are a satyr or possibly the god Acheloos and a female head flanked by wings and another head; these designs alternate. Also on each pendant are imitation carnelian and banded agate. Sirens form the clasps at the end of the necklace.

There are five rings that are a part of this set. One is a thin gold band with a cartouche of a sphinx and a lion, dated to about 530 BCE. Another ring has a much thicker gold band, and unlike the rest of the set, taken from the male's burial chamber. It features an oval carnelian in the enter, and is flanked by satyr heads on either side. A third ring features a gold band with a red carnelian that has a scarab on it. It swivels to show a man holding a club, who may be Hercle. A similar ring made of banded agate also features a scarab, as well as a youth holding a sword while leaning on a pillar. Finally there is another large gold band, featuring a bezel with a resting lion. It is surrounded by radiating palmettes.

Three pins also are a part of the set. One features segments that join to form a pomegranate flower. Another is much more simple, featuring a little sphere, but little other decoration. Finally there is a fibula with a double sphinx head, as well as rosettes. The earrings that form the set have a circular band of gold, with filigree branching out from the center. In the gold band and set in the center are carnelian stones, although some are now missing. This type of earring was common in Etruscan art, with similar examples in the British Museum.

== Later history and influence ==
This group of material was found in a two chamber tomb in Vulci by Domenico Campanari in 1832. The tomb ran alongside the Fiora River, and Campanari's entire family was involved with archaeological work in the area and as well as Poggio Buco and Tuscania. So influential was the family's work with Etruscan excavation, they helped organize some of the first exhibitions of Etruscan art in places such as London.

Within the tomb, one chamber was set aside for the male buried there, and the other set aside for a female. It is from the woman's portion of the tomb that the Vulci group was taken. The jewelry transferred to the hands of Jaques Claud, the Bargon Beugnot, and then to Rougemont de Lowemberg. By 1930 the set was on the antiquities market, and the museum purchased it in 1940.

The Vulci group is extremely important to the interest in Etruscan culture during the 19th century. Due to the richness of the materials within, and other like discoveries including a tomb on the property of the Prince of Canino in 1828, it became common for the wealthy to purchase imitation Etruscan jewelry. The Castellani family were some of the best known for their Etruscan influenced work.
