= Morgan Amber =

- Carved amber bow of a fibula
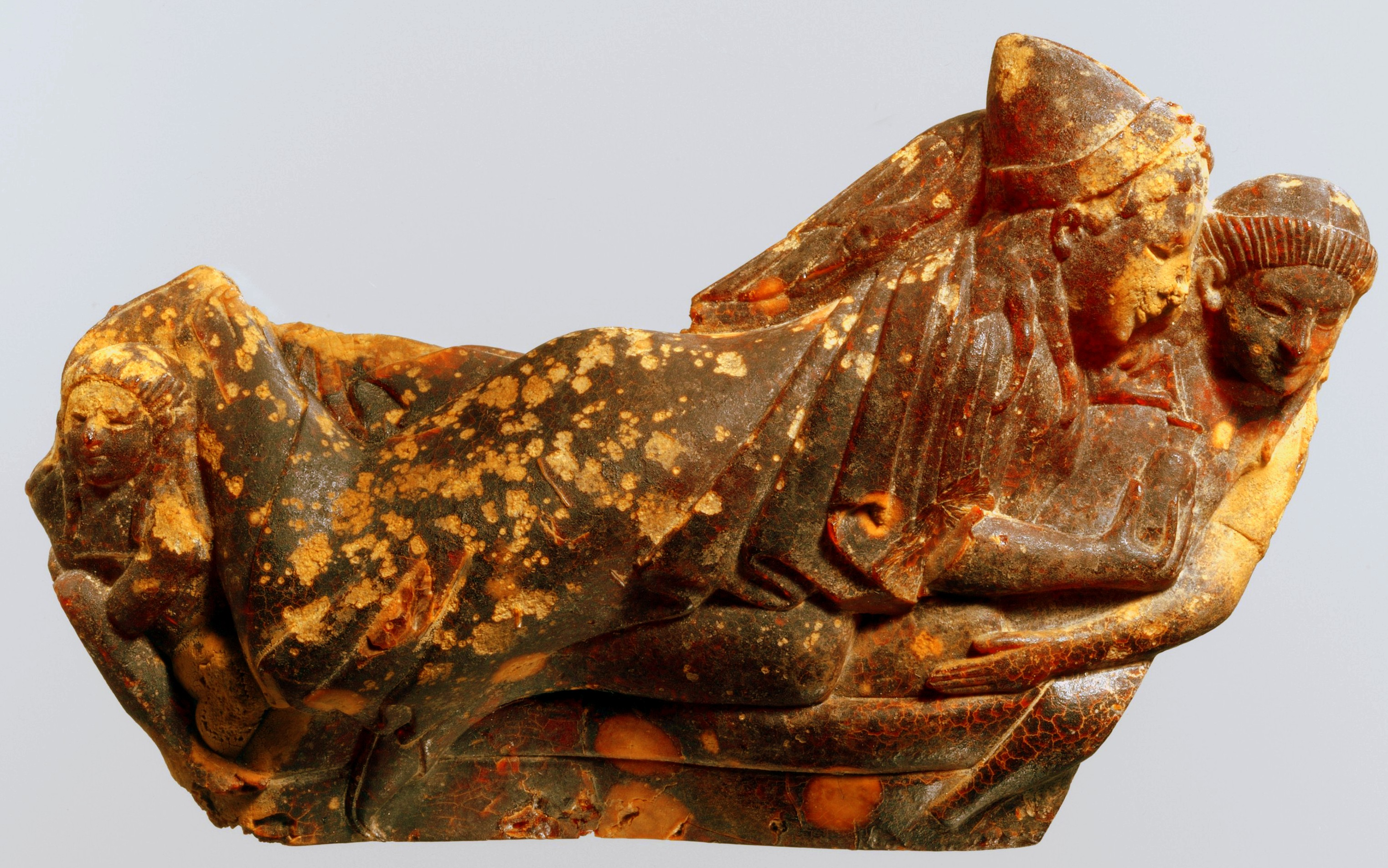
- Year: 5th century BCE
- Dimensions: 8.4 cm (3.3 in) × 14 cm (5.5 in) × 3.1 cm (1.2 in)
- Location: Metropolitan Museum of Art, United States
- Accession no.: 17.190.2067
- Identifiers: The Met object ID: 249223

Carved amber bow of a fibula, also known as the Morgan Amber, is a 5th-century BCE Etruscan fibula by an unknown artist. It is in the collection of the Metropolitan Museum of Art.

== Early history and creation ==
Carved from amber, this fibula dates to about 500 B.C.E. The artist is unknown, and there is some debate if the piece is Etruscan made or Etruscan influenced. Amber was a popular material in both Greek and Etruscan art, with the Etruscans using it frequently, often in funerary art.

== Description and interpretation ==
The work depicts a couple reclining on a sofa, with the woman in the forefront and the man behind her. A bird, possibly a duck, sits on the shoulders on the couple, and at the feet of the reclining duo is a small attendant. It is thought that this piece is a fibula because of the holes at the bottom which show some indications of an iron pin being there. The object is large, allowing for fine detail on the piece. In particular are the folds of the clothing on both the man and woman, their hair, and the woman's gesture of holding out a bottle of perfume or other oil in her right hand and holding two fingers out in her left hand, appearing to offer some to her companion. This gesture is visible in other pieces of Etruscan art, including the Sarcophagus of the Spouses in the Villa Giulia Etruscan museum located in Rome. The depiction of couples laying together and seemingly banqueting is also common, and be seen in the fresco of the Monterozzi necropolis of Tarquina, such as the Tomb of the Leopards and the Tomb of the Triclinium. Etruscan society allowed for women to participate in banquets and public life to a much greater extent than in Greece or Rome.

It is unknown if the couple carved in the amber are divine or simply two humans. Andrew Richter suggested that it may be Turan and Atunis (the Etruscan version of Aphrodite and Adonis) in 1940, since the motif of Turan and Atunis was popular in Etruscan art.

== Later history and influence ==
The fibula was given to the Metropolitan Museum of Art in 1917 by J. Pierpont Morgan. Supposedly it was found in Falconara Marittima, near Ancona, ancient Greek colony on the Adriatic coast of Italy. The Metropolitan Museum of Art's annual report from the time of acquisition simply describes the piece as "an amber group of two reclining figures" and as part of a larger donation given by Morgan.
