= Phoenicus (Ionia) =

Phoenicus or Phoinikous (Ancient Greek: Φοινικοῦς) was a port of ancient Ionia, at the foot of Mount Mimas (modern Boz Dağ; on the Karaburun Peninsula). Thucydides writes that during the Peloponnesian War after the Battle of Arginusae, the Athenian fleet took refuge in the harbour due to a big storm. Livy notices it in his account of the naval operations of the Romans and their allies against Antiochus III the Great.
