= Phoenicus (beetle) =

Phoenicus sanguinipennis

Scientific classification
- Kingdom: Animalia
- Phylum: Arthropoda
- Class: Insecta
- Order: Coleoptera
- Suborder: Polyphaga
- Infraorder: Cucujiformia
- Family: Cerambycidae
- Genus: Phoenicus
- Species: P. sanguinipennis

Binomial name
- Phoenicus sanguinipennis Lacordaire, 1869

Species of beetle

Phoenicus sanguinipennis is a species of beetle in the family Cerambycidae, the only species in the genus Phoenicus.
