= Phoenician =

Phoenician may refer to:

- Phoenicia, an ancient civilization
- Phoenician alphabet
  - Phoenician (Unicode block)
- Phoenicianism, a form of Lebanese nationalism
- Phoenician language
- List of Phoenician cities
- A resident of Phoenix and its suburbs

== See also ==
- Phoenix (mythology)
- Phoenix (disambiguation)
- Phoenicia (disambiguation)
