= Phoenicus (Messenia) =

Coordinates: 36°48′22″N 21°48′14″E

Phoenicus or Phoinikous (Ancient Greek: Φοινικοῦς), or Phoenicus Portus or Limne Phoinikous (Φοινικοῦς λιμήν), was a harbour town of ancient Messenia west of the promontory Acritas, and in front of the islands of Oenussae. It is believed to have been founded by the Phoenicians.

Its site is located near the modern Foinikounta.
