= Phoenicus (Lycia) =

Port of ancient Lycia

Coordinates: 36°15′53″N 29°25′16″E

Phoenicus or Phoinikous (Ancient Greek: Φοινικοῦς), also known as Phoenice or Phoinike (Φοινίκη), was a port of ancient Lycia, a little to the east of Patara; it was scarcely 2 miles (3.2 km) distant from the latter place, and surrounded on all sides by high cliffs. In the war against Antiochus III the Great, a Roman fleet took its station there with a view of taking Patara.

Its site is located near the modern Kalkan.
