= Phoenicus (Cythera) =

Coordinates: 36°08′31″N 23°00′15″E

Phoenicus or Phoinikous (Ancient Greek: Φοινικοῦς), or Phoenicus Portus or Limne Phoinikous (λιμὴν Φοινικοῦς), was a harbour town of ancient Cythera.

Its site is located near the modern Kapsali.
