= Gialova =

Village in Messenia, Greece

Gialova Γιάλοβα
- Settlement
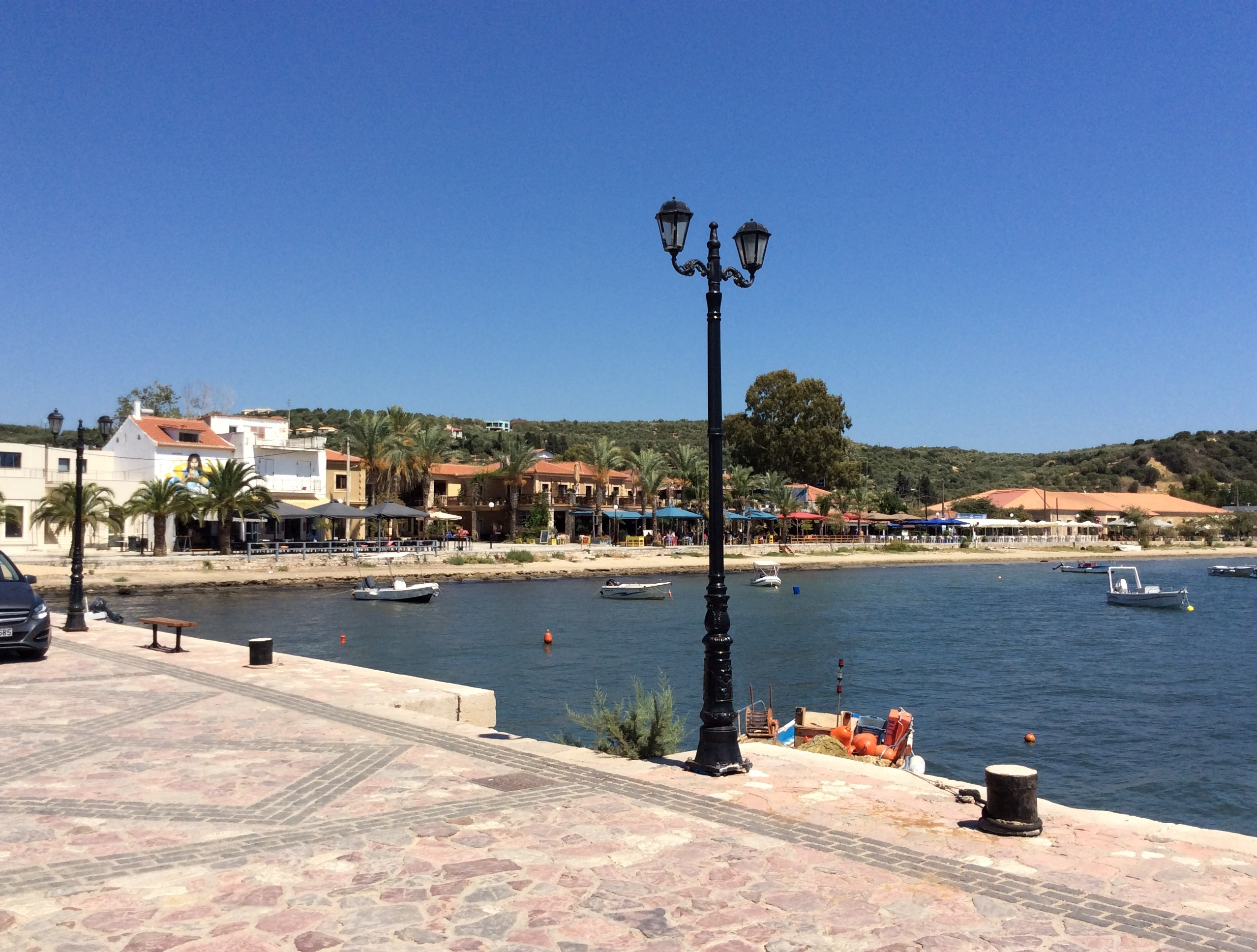
- View of Gialova from its mole

- Location within Greece
- Country: Greece
- Administrative region: Peloponnese
- Regional unit: Messenia
- Municipality: Pylos-Nestor
- Municipal unit: Pylos
- Community: Pylos

Population (2021)
  - Total: 240
- Time zone: UTC+2 (EET)
  - Summer (DST): UTC+3 (EEST)

Gialova (Greek: Γιάλοβα) is a village on Navarino Bay in the municipality of Pylos-Nestor in the regional unit of Messenia in the south-west Peloponnese, Greece, about six kilometres north of Pylos. The name derives from Greek γιαλός (shore) and Turkish ova (lowland), i.e. "lowland shore".

== Topography ==
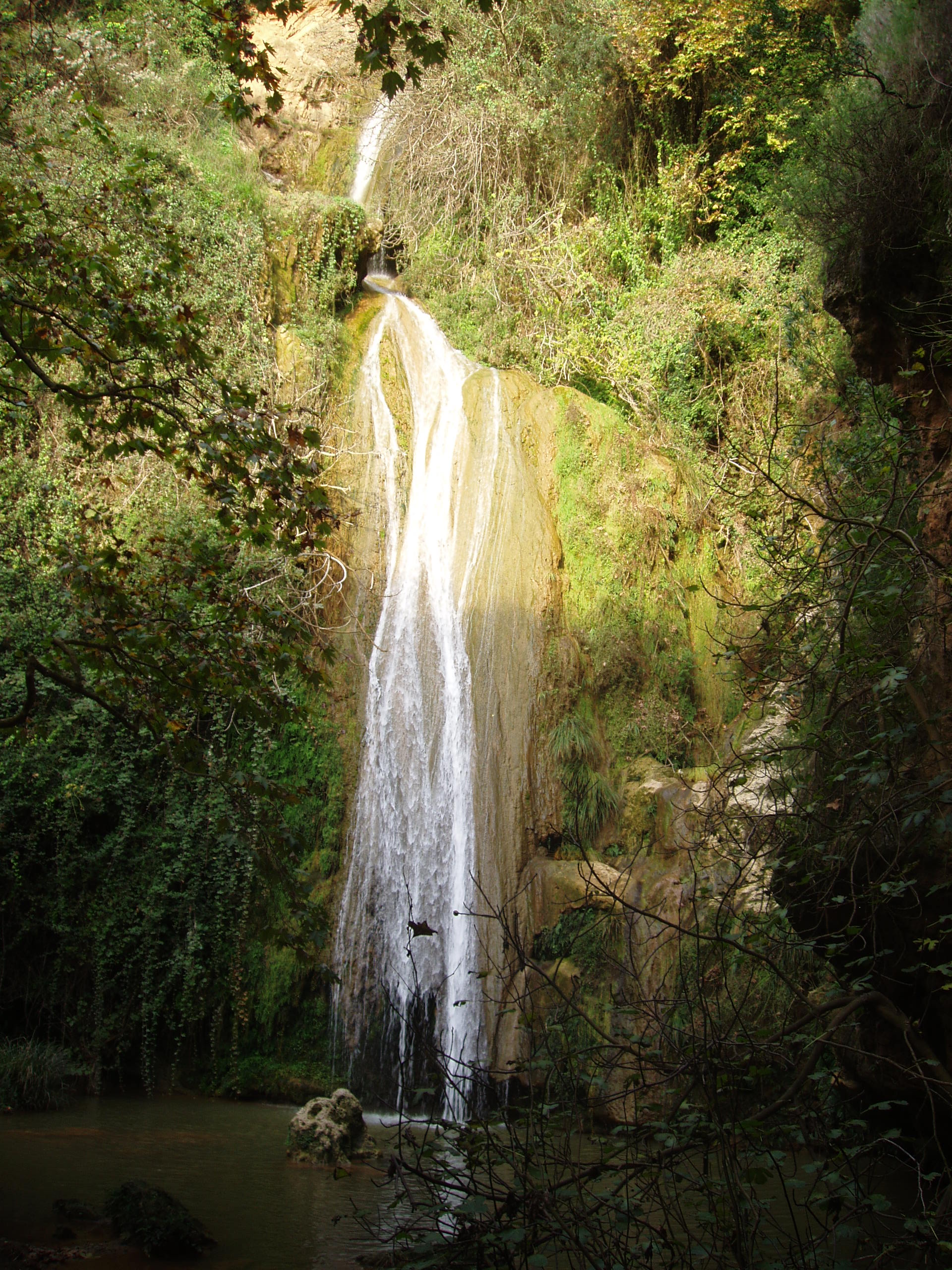
Kalamari Katarakt Waterfall near Gialova, Greece

The village is in two parts. The beach/port part of the village consists of two short streets, one fronting the Bay and the other at right angles to it, leading to the main Pylos-Kiparissia road. This part is largely touristic - bars and restaurants, shops, and the one hotel. Where the two streets meet there is a mole used by local fishing boats (and for car parking). The other, residential and commercial part of the village is about 1km further north along the Pylos-Kiparissia road. The modern development of Gialova also includes several houses and holiday villas on the hill behind Gialova, called Dapia (Greek: Ντάπια).

== Population ==
The area of Gialova was first settled at the beginning of the twentieth century. In 1928 there were 49 inhabitants. In the 2011 census, the population numbered 275 persons (2001: 258 persons).

== Industry ==
Signs of the area's former agricultural industry are evident in two abandoned wine factories (demolished in 2008 and 2016) and the stone warehouses formerly used to store raisins, carob and lemons, which were exported by boats from the mole. Today the main industry is small-scale tourism. There are two campsites, a hotel, restaurants, cafes, shops, villas, apartments and rooms to rent.

== Beaches and lagoon ==
In addition to the village beach to the south of the mole, a 1.5 kilometre long sandy beach, signposted "Golden Beach" but known as Divari (Greek: διβάρι meaning "hatchery") to local people, starts at Gialova and continues west to Old Navarino castle. The beach is actually a narrow bar separating the sea waters of the Bay from the brackish waters of Gialova Lagoon, a Natura 2000 site of major importance. It is the only location in Europe where the African chameleon is found. Immediately to the north of Old Navarino castle is the beach of Voidokilia.
