= Pylia =

Greek administrative area abolished 2006

Pylia Province Επαρχία Πυλίας
- Province of Greece
- 2006
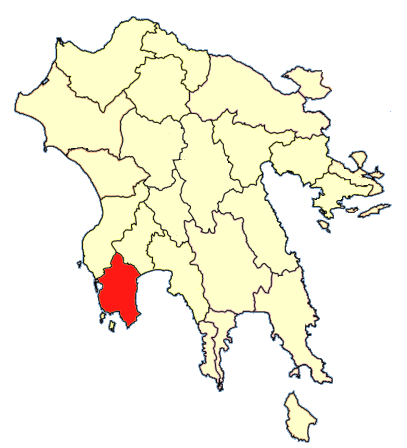
- Capital: Pylos

Pylia (Greek: Πυλία) was one of the provinces of the Messenia Prefecture. Its territory corresponded with that of the current municipality Pylos-Nestor (except for the municipal unit Nestoras) and the municipal units Aipeia, Petalidi and Voufrades. It was abolished in 2006.
