= Gialova Lagoon =

Water body in Pylos-Nestor, Greece

Coordinates: 36.964°N 21.672°E

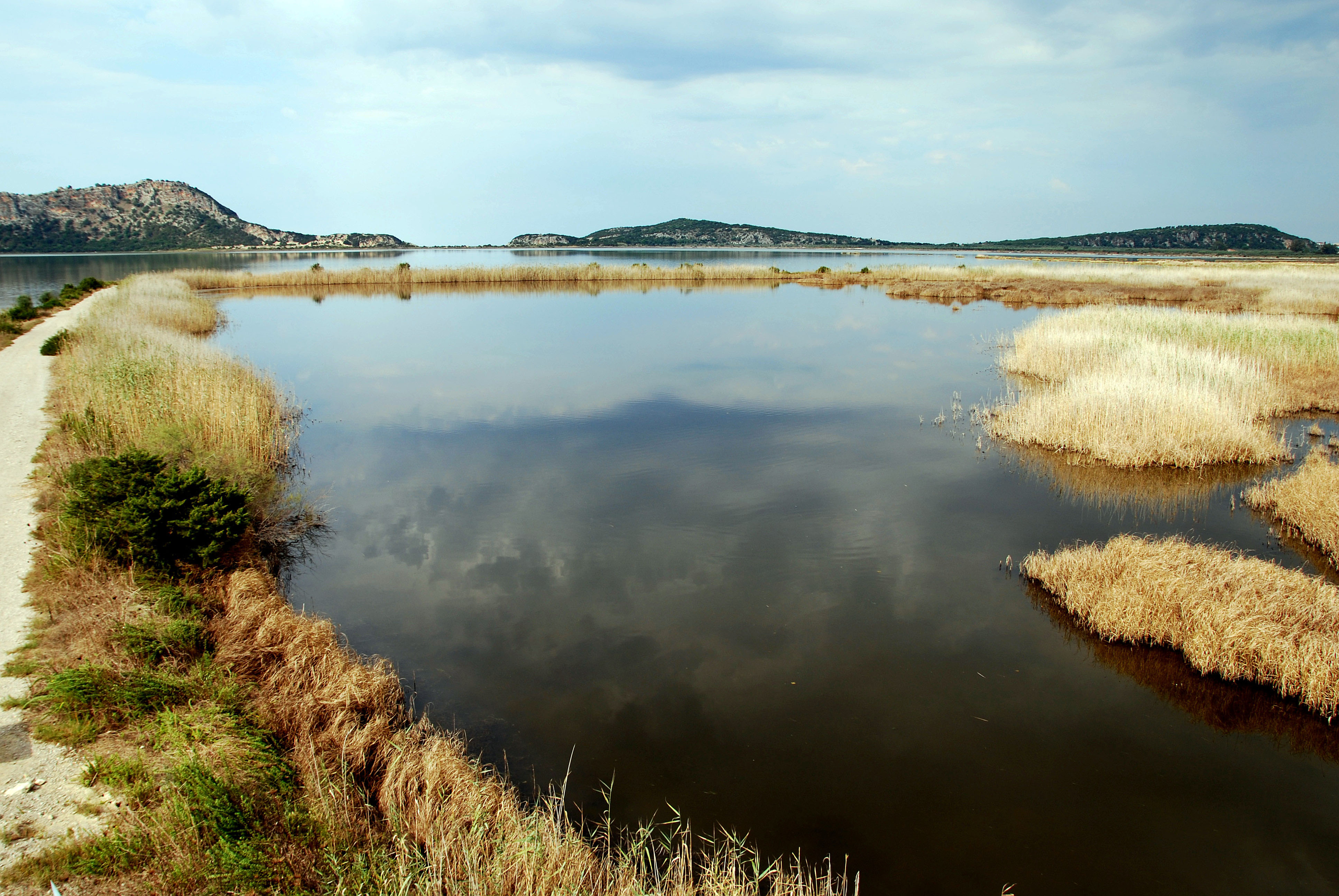
Gialova lagoon

Gialova Lagoon (Greek: Γιάλοβα, pronounced [ˈʝalova]) – also known as Divari, from the Latin word vivarium, meaning "fishery" – is a brackish body of water in the municipality of Pylos-Nestor, Greece, about 8 kilometres (5.0 mi) north of Pylos, near the village of Gialova. The lagoon, together with Voidokilia Bay, belongs to a unique ecosystem which constitutes a protected zone, in terms of both natural and cultural heritage. From the natural point of view, the entire area, together with Navarino Bay and the island of Sphacteria, forms part of the network Natura 2000 and has been named a Zone of Special Protection, with code GR2550008, and an Area of EU Importance, with code GR2550004.

== Fauna ==
It serves as a wildlife habitat, particularly for migratory birds, which stop here first on their way from Africa to Northern Europe. A multitude of mammals, reptiles, amphibians and fish live there. Prominent among them is the African Chamelaeon, which is threatened by extinction. It is thought that this species came to the region during the Roman period, as it appears also in other regions of the Pax Romana, such as the Iberian peninsula, Malta and Cyprus.

== Archaeology ==
The region has been proclaimed a zone of archaeological protection. It contains unique sites of archaeological interest, such as the tomb of Thrasymedes at Voidokoilia, the remains of Classical Pylos at Koryphasion, Palaiokastro or Palaionavarino, the cave of Nestor. In the 1960s at Yalova proper at the site called Divari, N. Yalouris, then director of the local archaeological service, excavated a Hellenistic necropolis. The excavations revealed several unspoiled shaft graves. Apart from the skeletal material, the graves were full of grave goods, mainly pottery, as well as coins, objects made of various metals and jewellery. Among these finds stand out a delta-shaped askos, known also as “hot-water bottle”, a clay sieve, a small aryballos made of faience and fish-plates. These finds are kept in the Archaeological Museum of Pylos.

== Threats and protection ==
The lagoon had been endangered in the recent past due to plans to divert the rivers, and other sources of water that feed into the ecosystem and turn the area into arable land, but is now protected.

== Gallery ==
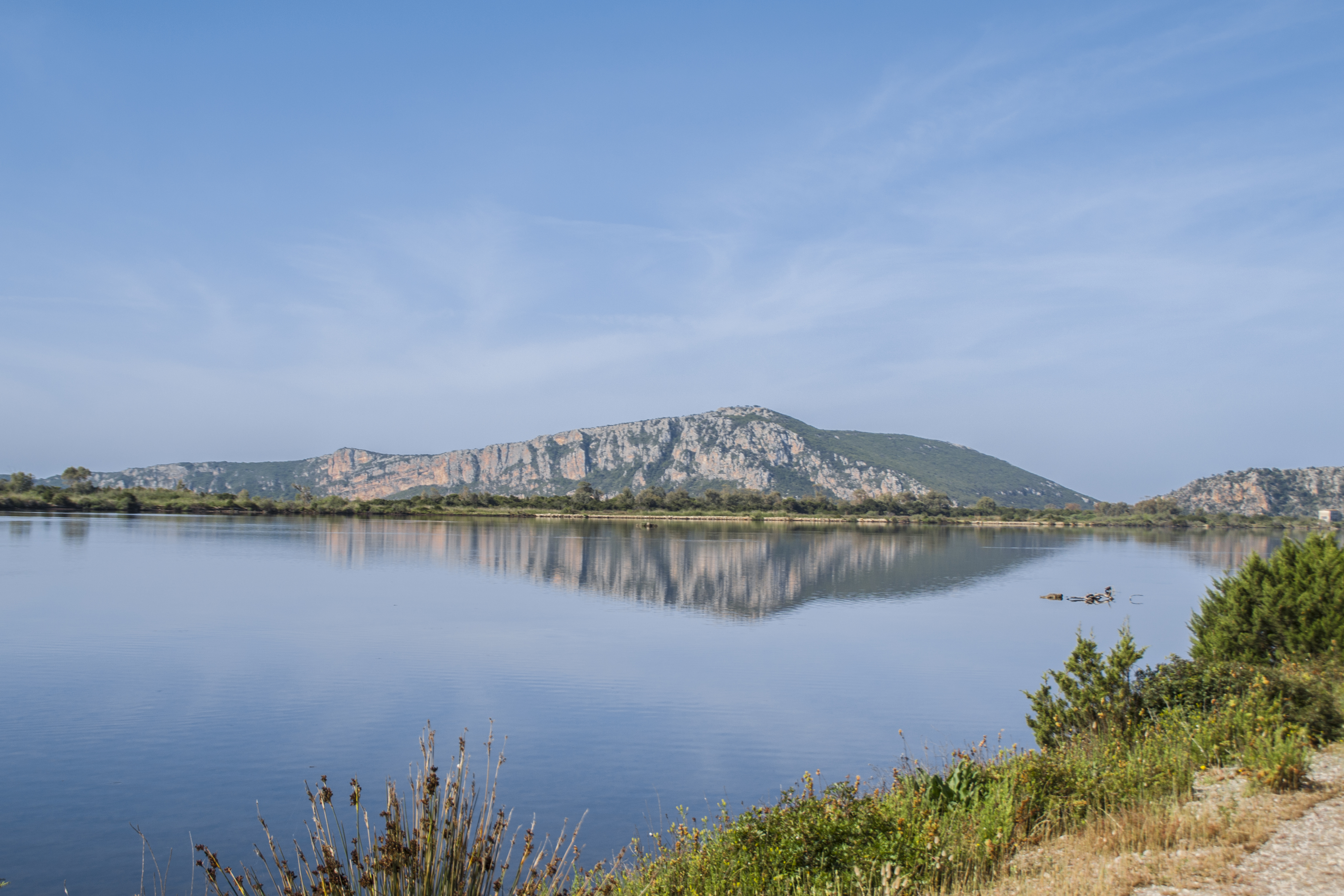

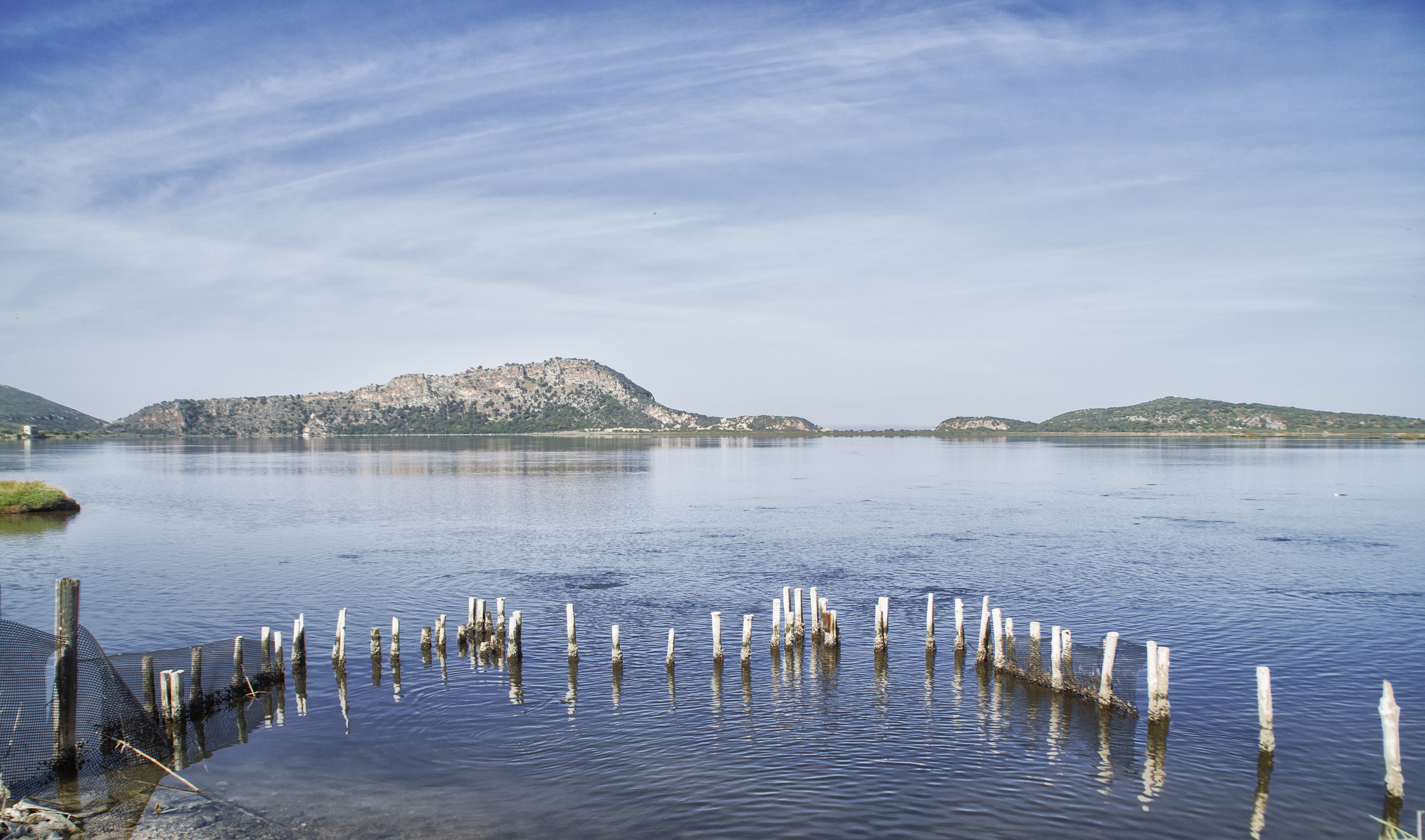

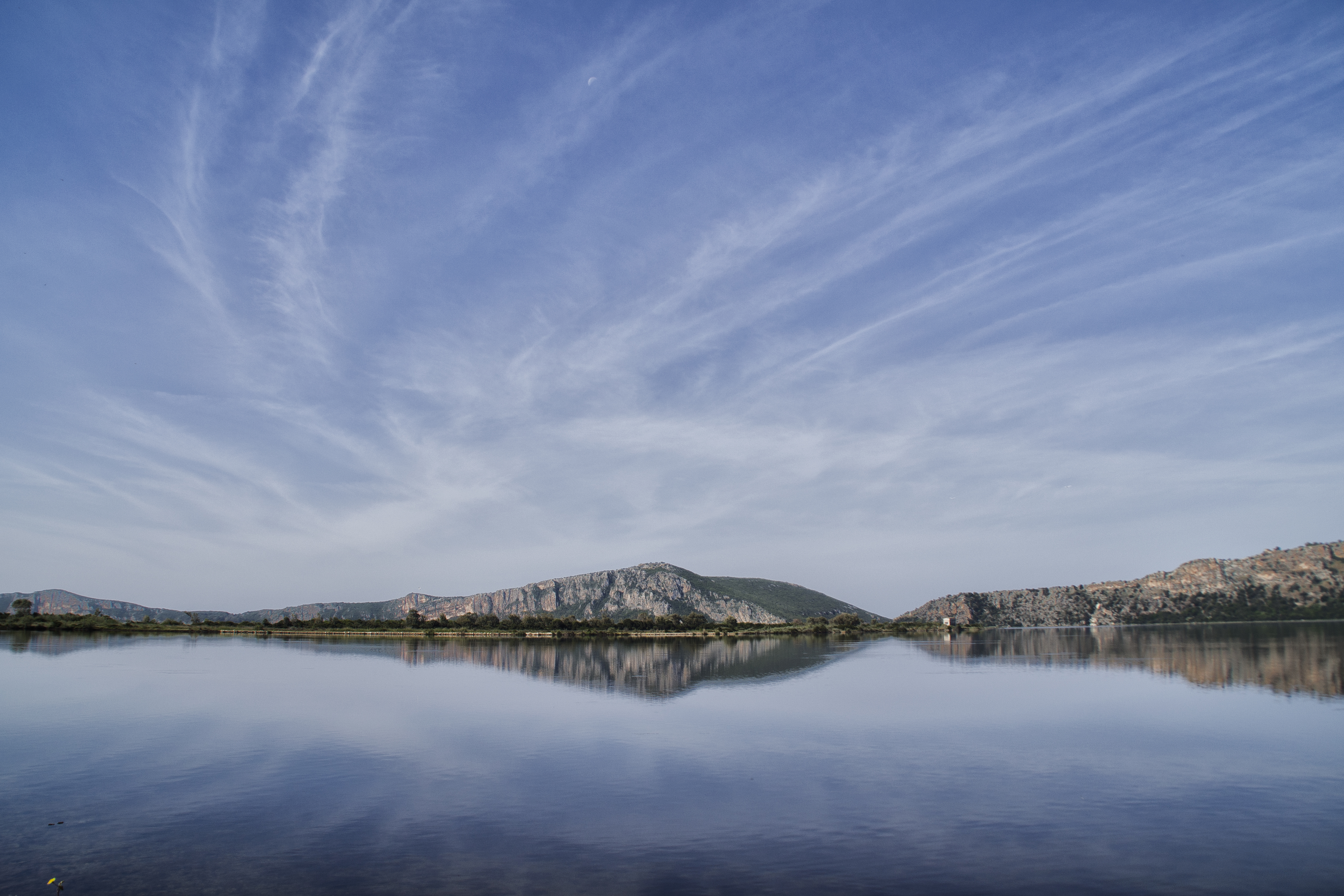

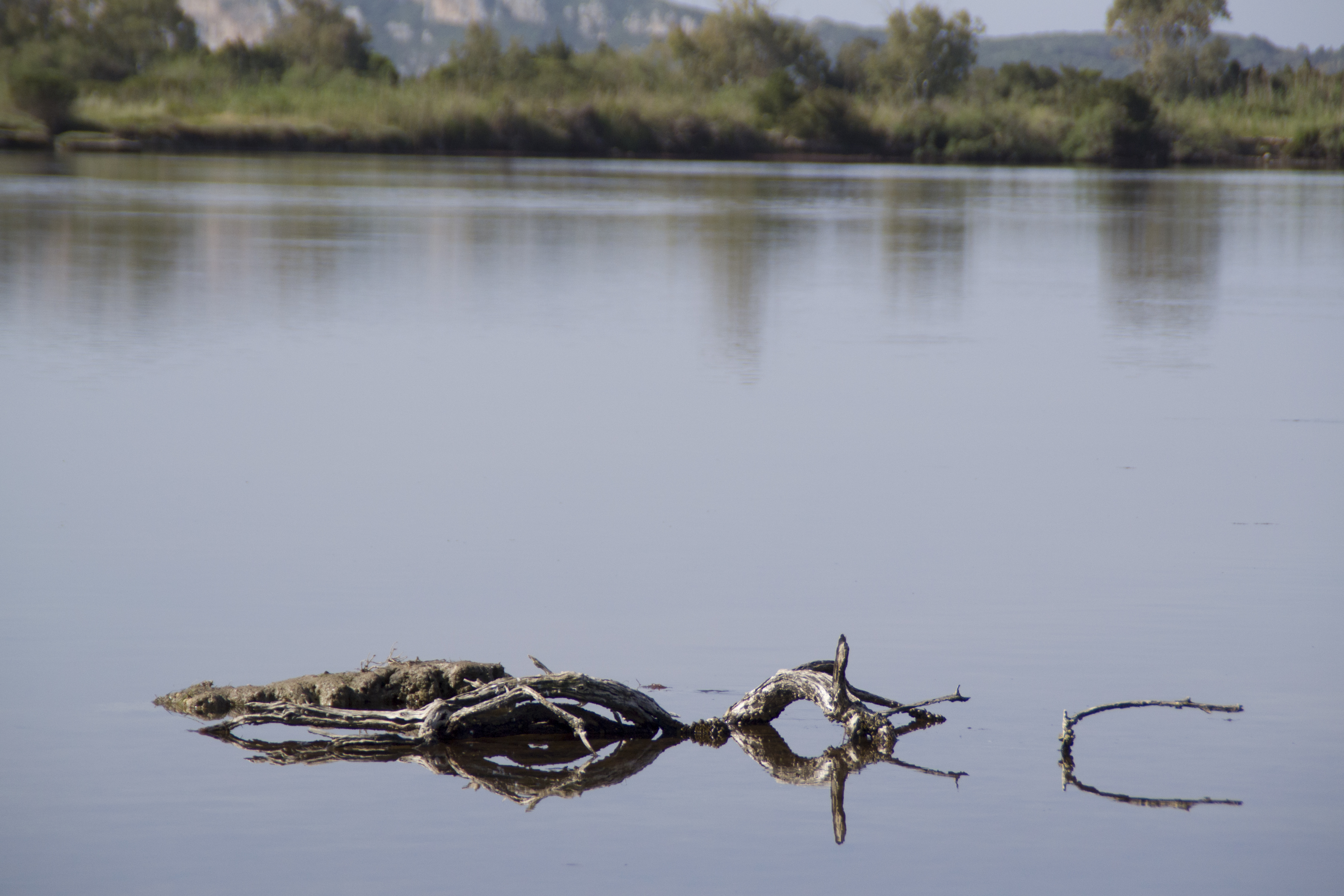

== Bibliography ==
- Γιαλούρης, Ν., Αρχαιολογικό Δελτίο 21, 1966 Χρονικά, σελ. 163-165
- Κορρές, Γ.Σ., Ο όρμος του Ναυαρίνου στην Αρχαιότητα, Επτά Ημέρες, Καθημερινή, 2 Οκτωβρίου 1994
