= Chiliochoria =

Chiliochoria Χιλιοχώρια
- Municipal unit
- Location within the regional unit

- Location within Greece
- Coordinates: 36°57′N 21°47′E
- Country: Greece
- Administrative region: Peloponnese
- Regional unit: Messenia
- Municipality: Pylos-Nestor

Area
  - Municipal unit: 73.95 km^{2} (28.55 sq mi)

Population (2021)
  - Municipal unit: 1,993
  - Municipal unit density: 26.95/km^{2} (69.80/sq mi)
- Time zone: UTC+2 (EET)
  - Summer (DST): UTC+3 (EEST)
- Vehicle registration: ΚΜ

Chiliochoria (Greek: Χιλιοχώρια) is a former municipality in Messenia, Peloponnese, Greece. Since the 2011 local government reform it is part of the municipality Pylos-Nestor, of which it is a municipal unit. The municipal unit has an area of 73.950 km^{2}. Its population in 2021 was 1,993. The seat of the municipality was in Chandrinos.
