= Pylos-Nestoras =

Pylos-Nestoras Δήμος Πύλου - Νέστορος
- Municipality
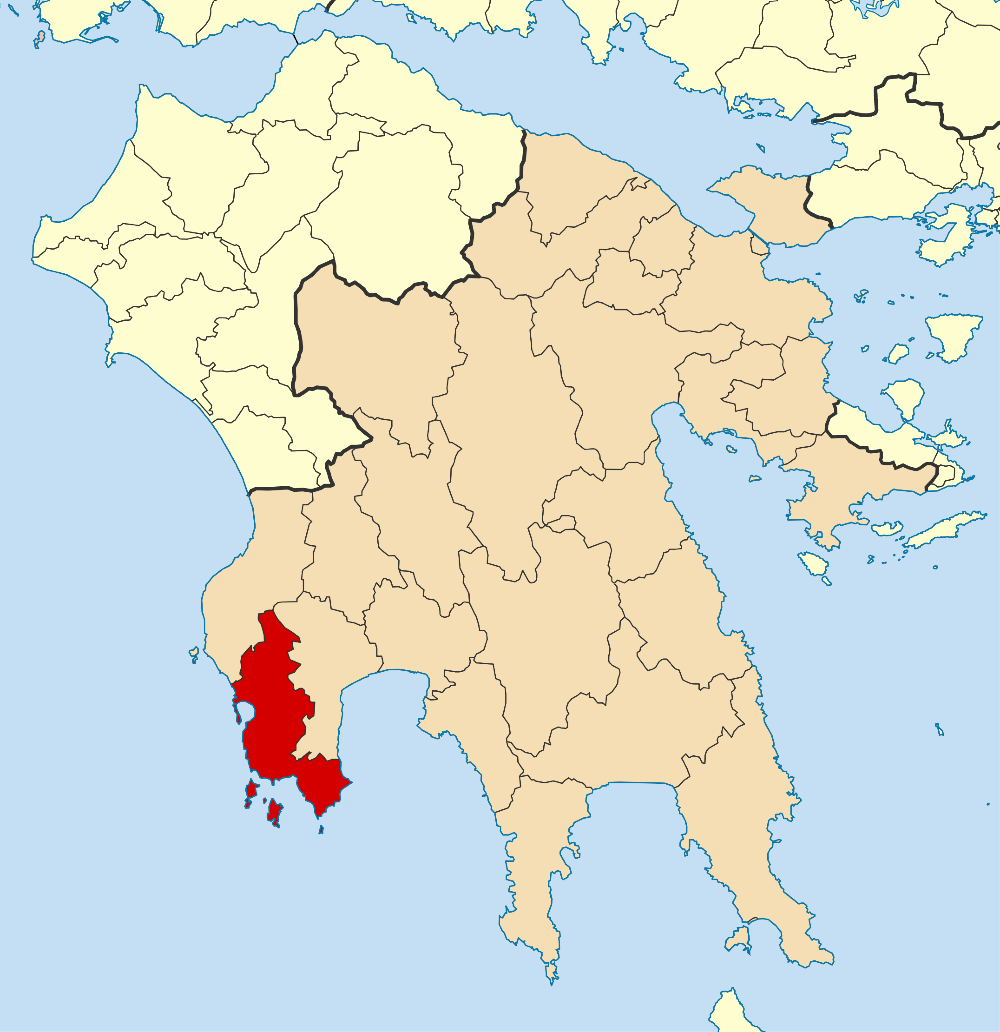

- Location within Greece
- Coordinates: 36°54′N 21°41′E
- Country: Greece
- Administrative region: Peloponnese
- Regional unit: Messenia
- Seat: Pylos

Area
  - Municipality: 554.3 km^{2} (214.0 sq mi)

Population (2021)
  - Municipality: 17,194
  - Density: 31.02/km^{2} (80.34/sq mi)
- Time zone: UTC+2 (EET)
  - Summer (DST): UTC+3 (EEST)

Pylos-Nestoras (Greek: Δήμος Πύλου - Νέστορος) is a municipality in the Messenia regional unit, Peloponnese, Greece. The seat of the municipality is the town Pylos. The municipality has an area of 554.265 km^{2}.

== Municipality ==
The municipality Pylos-Nestoras was formed at the 2011 local government reform by the merger of the following 6 former municipalities, that became municipal units:

- Chiliochoria
- Koroni
- Methoni
- Nestoras
- Papaflessas
- Pylos
