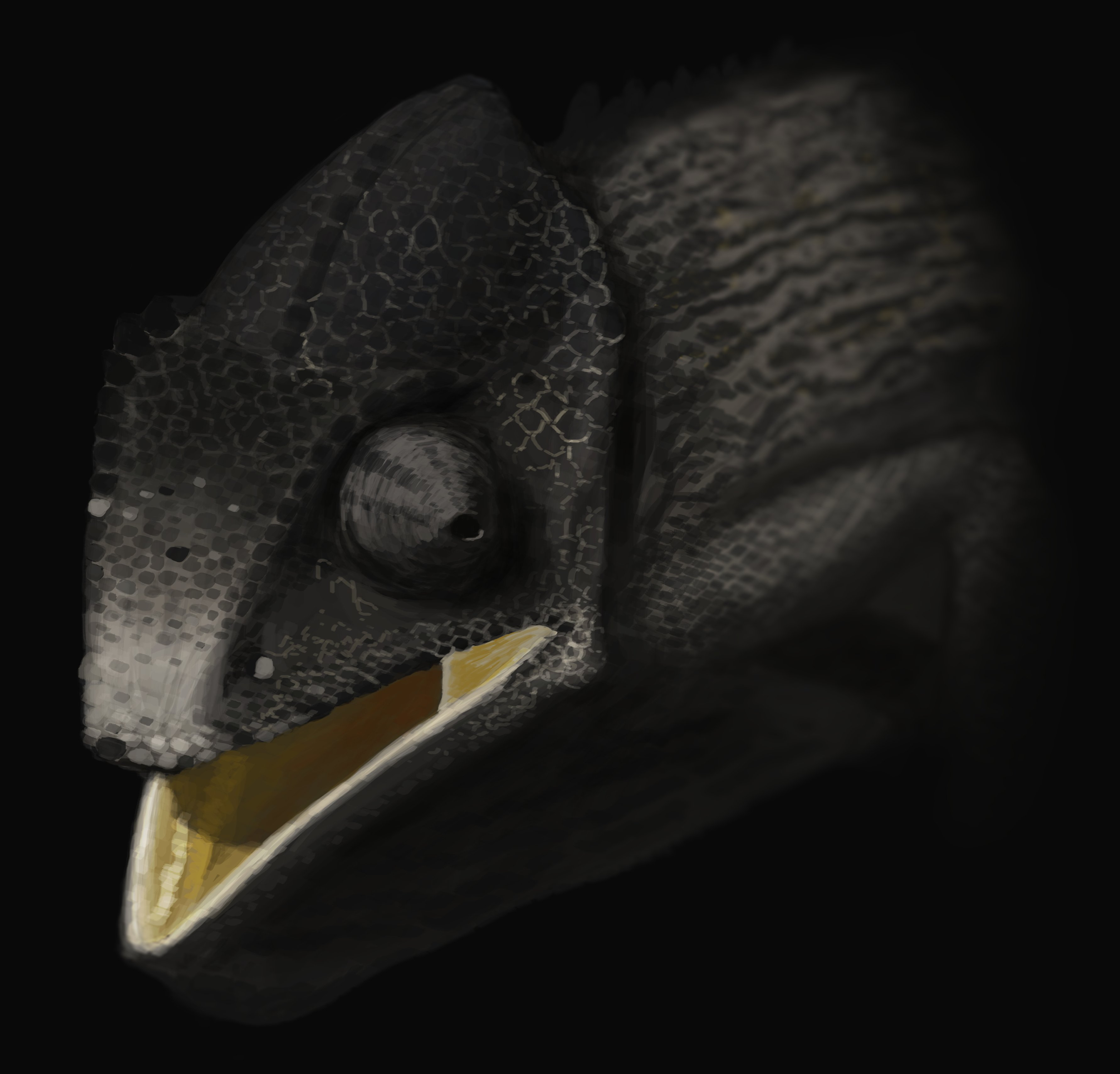
- Reconstruction of Chamaeleo intermedius

Scientific classification
- Kingdom: Animalia
- Phylum: Chordata
- Order: Squamata
- Suborder: Iguania
- Family: Chamaeleonidae
- Genus: Chamaeleo
- Species: †C. intermedius

Binomial name
- †Chamaeleo intermedius Hillenius, 1978

= Chamaeleo intermedius =

Chamaeleo intermedius Temporal range: Miocene 14 Ma

Extinct species of chameleon

Chamaeleo intermedius is an extinct species of chameleon from the Miocene of Kenya. It was given its name based on the fact that it shares traits with both species of the genus Chamaeleo and those of Trioceros, which at the time were placed in the same genus. This belief that it was an intermediate form was however rejected by later research.

== History and naming ==
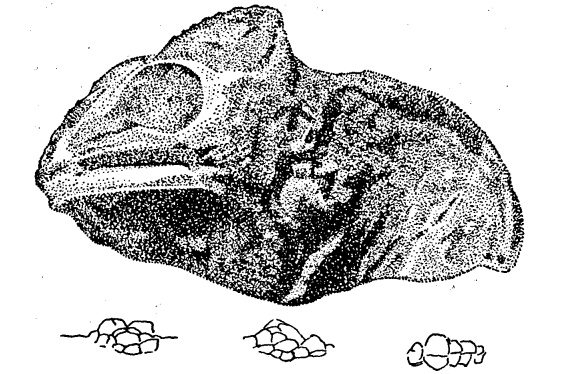
Type specimen of ''Chamaeleo intermedius'', bottom row shows the dorsal knobs in different perspectives

The holotype of Chamaeleo intermedius, specimen KNM-FT 3833, was discovered at a paleontological site near Fort Ternan in Kenya. It consists of a well preserved calcite cast that preserves the entire head and parts of the upper body, cut off by an almost straight line ranging from the throat to approximately the halfway point of the back. The fossil material was recognized as a chameleon and subsequently described by Hillenius in 1978, after having been given the material by Richard Erskine Frere Leakey.

The species name "intermedius" was chosen due to the belief that Chamaeleo intermedius may represent a missing link between the group around the common chameleon and those around the side-striped chameleon, the later of which are now regarded as forming the distinct genus Trioceros. In a later publication it is argued that this name would be quite ironic, as the species was found to fit more comfortably into just one of the two groups.

== Description ==
Chamaeleo intermedius was a relatively small chameleon based on the fossil material, which is only 4.3 cm (1.7 in) long from the head to the middle of the torso. However it clearly exhibits traits typically associated with the genus Chamaeleo including the higher than broad body, well developed keel along the back, large eyes, helmet-like casque, well defined parietal crest and the presence of a swollen throat pouch likely containing the characteristic projectile tongue these reptiles are known for. Only a small section of an arm is preserved, which matches the narrow nature of chameleon limbs. Parts of the upper lip were curled up during preservation, revealing two different tooth morphologies. Teeth towards the front show three cusps while other teeth are composed of a single cone surrounded by a cup. The type description notes that Chamaeleo intermedius preserves no traits unique to this species, but is instead defined based on the combination of features.

The casque or helmet of Chamaeleo intermedius is formed by a well developed and elevated parietal crest and what was originally described as temporal crests on either side of the skull. However a later publication by Klaver argued that these temporal crests may in fact have been misidentified lateral crests based on their resemblance to the same structure in the Namaqua chameleon. The canthi rostralis between the eyes and snout is also well developed. The casque ascends relatively gradually before descending abruptly towards the neck. Both the forked parietal and temporal crests are lined by conic tubercles, which are also present around the eyesockets. The back of this species is lined by a double row of scales, however around the neck some larger scales form structures similar to the dorsal ridge seen in the Namaqua chameleon or the Mount Lefo chameleon. The later was especially highlighted as its dorsal ridge was also composed of two scale rows. Similar but smaller structures are also found further back on the body. Besides this scale structures and the double row along the back, the scales of this species are generally homogenous and of similar size and shape across the body. Chamaeleo intermedius preserves no crest along its throat, no lateral crests or occipital lobes attached to the casque and no other ornaments such as brow or nose horns.

In regards to the homogenous scales, dorsal knobs, lack of a throat crest and elevated parietal crest it resembles the modern Namaqua chameleon from southern Africa. The two differ however as the modern species has irregular dorsal scales, an unforked parietal crest and a head and body that are both notably broadened. The dorsal knobs of Chamaeleon intermedius also bear resemblance to those found in some Mount Lefo chameleons. The list of differences between the two is however greater, as the Mount Lefo chameleon has varying scale size across the body, a throat crest, both temporal and lateral crests and a flat casque. The overall crest anatomy of the fossil species is generally similar to the side-striped chameleon and species related to it such as the Jackson's chameleon, Werner's chameleon, Ngosi Volcano chameleon as well as the tiger chameleon. Here too several differences were however noted, including the heterogenous scales of the body, presence of a gullar crest and form of the dorsal crest.

== Classification ==
When described, Chamaeleo intermedius was firmly placed in the extant genus Chamaeleo. Specific attention is drawn to its anatomy displaying a mix of features between two groups within the genus, those surrounding the common chameleon and Namaqua chameleon and those surrounding the side-striped chameleon. However, in recent years the later group has been deemed distinct enough to warrant its own independent genus, now named Trioceros. This may be resolved by observations made by Klaver. Klaver argues that the temporal crest of Chamaeleo intermedius may in fact be homologous to the lateral crest of the Namaqua chameleon and furthermore goes on to say that forked parietals are also known in species of the Chamaeleo group and not exclusive to what is now Trioceros. Subsequently, the argument is made that Chamaeleo intermedius, in spite of its name, fits neatly into the genus Chamaeleo and may in fact not be the transitional form it was initially thought to be.
