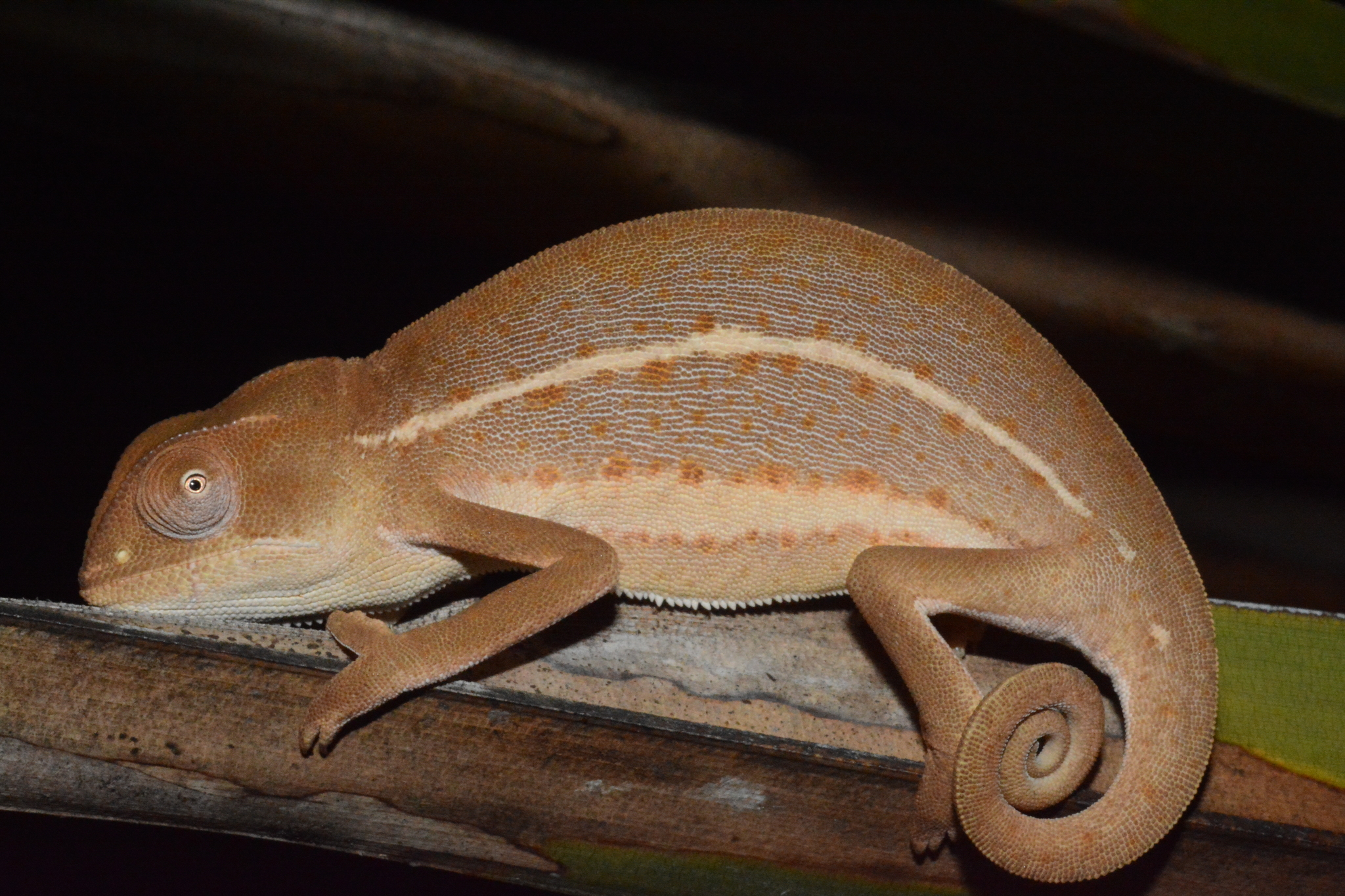

Conservation status
- Least Concern (IUCN 3.1)

Scientific classification
- Kingdom: Animalia
- Phylum: Chordata
- Class: Reptilia
- Order: Squamata
- Suborder: Iguania
- Family: Chamaeleonidae
- Genus: Chamaeleo
- Species: C. laevigatus

Binomial name
- Chamaeleo laevigatus Gray, 1863
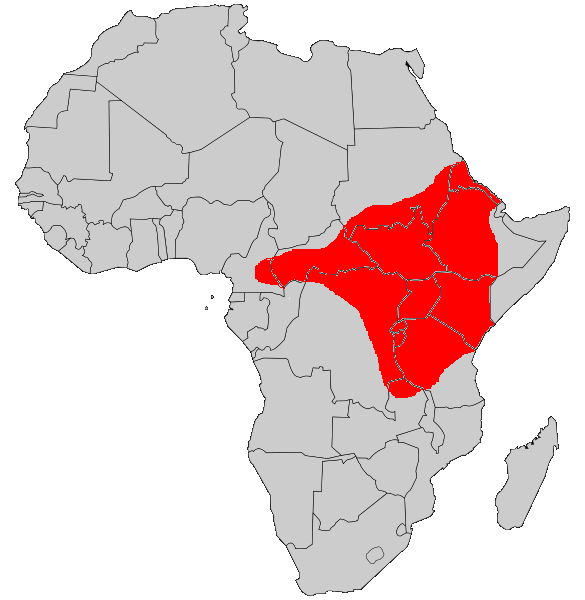
- Distribution of Smooth Chameleon

Synonyms
- Chamaeleon sphaeropholis Reichenow, 1887

= Smooth chameleon =

Species of lizard

The smooth chameleon (Chamaeleo laevigatus) is a species of chameleon native to Sub-Saharan Africa. It is bluish-green and has small scales. Its body is very slender, and it is similar to Chamaeleo senegalensis.

== Distribution ==
Found mostly in the lowlands, Chamaeleo laevigatus is widely distributed in the Central and East Africa. It has been recorded in Burundi, Rwanda, Kenya, Sudan, South Sudan, Uganda, Tanzania, the Democratic Republic of the Congo, Central African Republic, Zambia, Ethiopia, and Cameroon. There is uncertainty whether the Cameroonian records represent this species or the morphologically similar Chamaeleo senegalensis, and the same may apply to the Central African Republic.

== Habitat ==
It is an arboreal savanna species, sometimes observed in trees along watercourses.
