= Austin Stevens =

South African-born Australian naturalist

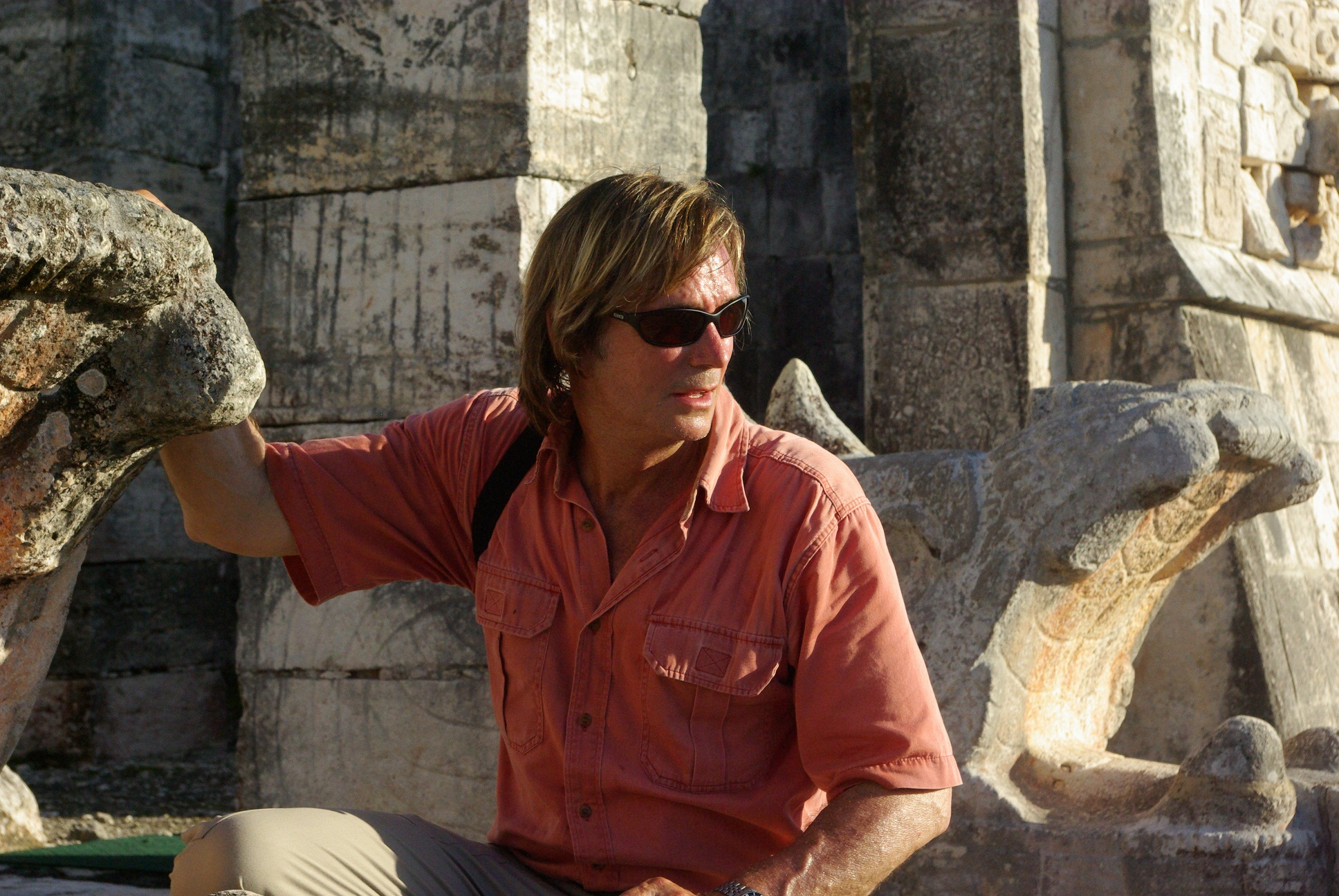
- Born: 19 May 1950 (age 76); Pretoria, Transvaal (modern-day Gauteng), South Africa
- Occupations: Herpetologist; wildlife photographer; filmmaker
- Years active: 1974−present
- Website: Austin Stevens Official Website (closed in 2016)

Austin Stevens (born 19 May 1950) is a South African-born Australian naturalist, herpetologist, wildlife photographer, documentarian, television personality, and author. He is best known as the host of the Animal Planet nature documentary series Austin Stevens: Snakemaster (2004−09).

== Early life ==
Stevens was born on 19 May 1950 in Pretoria, Transvaal. His mother was often ill, lost a lung in a car accident, and died when Stevens was in his 30s; his father owned a small typewriter repair business. Stevens became interested in snakes at the age of 12, and by the time he finished school, his reptile collection included some of the most exotic and venomous species in the world. He traces his adventurous streak back to his grandfather from Bristol, England and part founder of the AJS Motorbike Corporation.

== Career ==
Stevens' career in herpetology also included hosting a TV programme called Austin Stevens: Snakemaster. The show aired on Animal Planet in the United States and 5 in the United Kingdom. For season two, the series was rechristened Austin Stevens Adventures, which, in a similar vein to fellow Animal Planet shows The Crocodile Hunter and The Jeff Corwin Experience, began focusing on other animals, such as rhinos and hyenas, along with snakes; the show was presented in high definition and broadcast a total of 28 episodes before ending in 2009. His book The Last Snake Man was published in the UK by Noir Publishing.

Stevens uses a Samsung Pro815 and an unspecified Sony Cybershot model for general use.

=== Personal life ===
In December 2007, Austin Stevens married his second wife Amy, a young python keeper from Australia. Following the marriage, Stevens relocated to Australia.

In September 2016, Stevens revealed that he had been diagnosed with Parkinson's disease.

In June 2023, Stevens revealed that he had had surgery to remove a basal cell skin cancer from his right brow. Stevens later reported that the surgery was a success and no further treatment was necessary.

== Works ==
Some of his credits:

- Dragons of the Namib, a documentary about the life of the Namaqua Chameleon. Producer and cinematographer.
- Africa's Deadliest Dozen, a documentary about the venomous snakes of Africa. Cinematographer.
- Die Natur der Schlange (German: The Nature of Snakes), a 1997 German Documentary on snakes, aired on ZDF.
- Austin takes wildlife stock photographs for Animals Animals/Earth Scenes
- He is a media donor on ARKive

Books:

- Snakes in My Bed (Penguin 1992)
- The Last Snake Man (Noir Publishing 2007) ISBN 978-0-9536564-6-2
- Snakemaster (Skyhorse Publishing 2014)

DVDs:

- Snake Bite: In Search of the King Cobra (Go Entertain 2005)
- Austin Stevens: Snakemaster (first three episodes)
