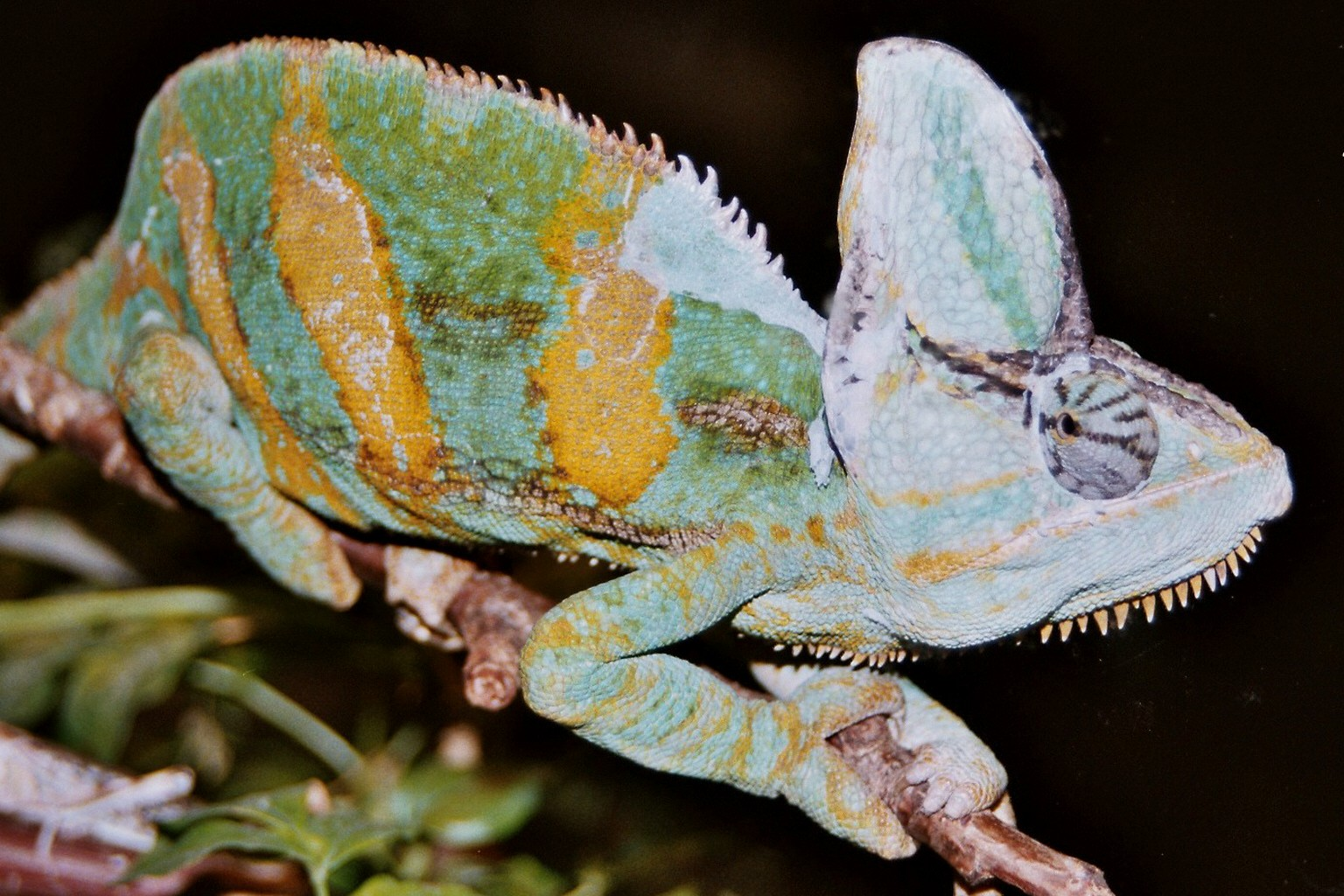
- Chamaeleo calyptratus, veiled chameleon

Scientific classification
- Kingdom: Animalia
- Phylum: Chordata
- Class: Reptilia
- Order: Squamata
- Suborder: Iguania
- Family: Chamaeleonidae
- Subfamily: Chamaeleoninae
- Genus: Chamaeleo; Laurenti, 1768

Type species
- Chamaeleo parisiensium Laurenti, 1768

Diversity
- 14 species

= Chamaeleo =

Chamaeleo Temporal range: Early Miocene- present, 26–0 Ma

Genus of lizards

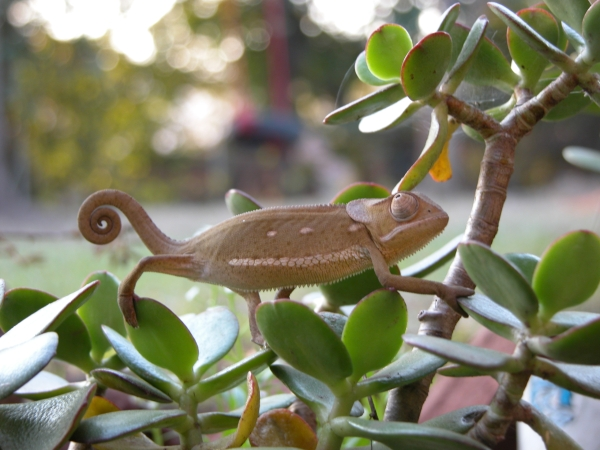
Chamaeleo dilepis, flap-necked chameleon

Chamaeleo is a genus of chameleons in the family Chamaeleonidae. Most species of the genus Chamaeleo are found in sub-Saharan Africa, but a few species are also present in northern Africa, southern Europe, and southern Asia east to India and Sri Lanka.

== Description ==
Species in the genus Chamaeleo are slow moving, with independently movable eyes, the ability to change skin colouration, a long tongue, usually a prehensile tail, and special leg adaptations for grasping vegetation. Males are generally larger and more colorful than females. Almost all species have a maximum snout-vent length (SVL) between 15 and 40 centimetres (5.9 and 15.7 in).

== Behavior ==
The vast majority of Chamaeleo species are arboreal and typically found in trees or bushes, but a few species (notably the Namaqua Chameleon) are partially or largely terrestrial.

== Reproduction ==
The genus Chamaeleo includes only oviparous species.

== In captivity ==
With few exceptions, the chameleons most commonly seen in captivity are all members of the genus Chamaeleo; the most commonly found species in the pet trade (as well as through captive breeders) include the common, Senegal, and veiled chameleons, but all chameleons tend to require special care, and are generally suited to the intermediate or advanced reptile keeper.

== Taxonomy ==
Chamaeleo is the type genus of the family Chamaeleonidae.

All other genera of "traditional chameleons" in the subfamily Chamaeleoninae (Archaius, Bradypodion, Calumma, Furcifer, Kinyongia, Nadzikambia, and Trioceros) have at some point been included in the genus Chamaeleo, but are now regarded as separate genera by virtually all authorities.

== Extant species ==
14 species are recognized as being valid, and subspecies are recognized for some species.

Image	Scientific name	Common name	Distribution
	Chamaeleo africanus Laurenti, 1768	African chameleon	Sahel, from Mali and Mauritania to Sudan, north to Egypt
	Chamaeleo anchietae Bocage, 1872	Angola double-scaled chameleon	Angola, DR Congo, Tanzania
	Chamaeleo arabicus Matschie, 1893	Arabian chameleon	southern Arabian Peninsula
	Chamaeleo calcaricarens Böhme, 1985	Awash spurless chameleon	Ethiopia, Eritrea, Djibouti, N Somalia
	Chamaeleo calyptratus A.M.C. Duméril & A.H.A. Duméril, 1851	veiled chameleon	Yemen and Saudi Arabia
	Chamaeleo chamaeleon (Linnaeus, 1758)	common chameleon	S Greece (Aegean Islands, Crete, Chios, Samos), Malta, S Portugal, S Spain, S/E Turkey, Cyprus, Italy (Apulia, Calabria), N Africa: Western Sahara, Morocco, Algeria, Tunisia, Libya, Egypt, Sinai, Israel, Jordan, SW Saudi Arabia, Yemen, Lebanon, Syria, Iraq
	Chamaeleo dilepis Leach, 1819	flap-necked chameleon	Congo, Angola, Cameroon, Congo, Equatorial Guinea, Gabon, Kenya, Malawi (Shire Highlands), Namibia, Nigeria, Republic of South Africa, Eswatini, Botswana, Somalia, Tanzania, Uganda, Democratic Republic of the Congo (Zaire; except in the north), Zambia, Burundi, Uganda, E Zaire, Tanzania (Pemba Island), Mozambique, Ethiopia, Zimbabwe
	Chamaeleo gracilis Hallowell, 1844	graceful chameleon	Central African Republic, Ivory Coast, Ethiopia, Democratic Republic of the Congo (Zaire), Senegal, Gambia, Sierra Leone, Liberia, Ghana, Togo, Nigeria, Cameroon, Tanzania, Kenya, Uganda, Somalia, Ethiopia, Sudan, Guinea (Conakry), Gambia, Benin, E Burkina Faso
	Chamaeleo laevigatus Gray, 1863	smooth chameleon	Burundi, Rwanda, Kenya, Sudan, Uganda, Tanzania, North and South Democratic Republic of the Congo (Zaire), Central African Republic, Zambia, Eritrea, Ethiopia, Cameroon
	Chamaeleo monachus Gray, 1865	Socotran chameleon	Yemen (Socotra Island)
	Chamaeleo namaquensis A. Smith, 1831	Namaqua chameleon	South Angola, Namibia, Republic of South Africa
	Chamaeleo necasi Ullenbruch, P. Krause & Böhme, 2007	Nečas' flap-necked chameleon	Togo, Benin
	Chamaeleo senegalensis Daudin, 1802	Senegal chameleon	Tropical West Africa from Senegal to Cameroon: Guinea-Bissau, Guinea (Conakry), Sierra Leone, Liberia, Ivory Coast, Ghana, Togo, Benin, Nigeria, Mali, Gambia, Central African Republic, Mauritania
	Chamaeleo zeylanicus Laurenti, 1768	Indian chameleon	Sri Lanka, India (Gujarat, Maharashtra, Kerala, Madhya Pradesh, Southern plains of the Ganges, Tamil Nadu, Telangana), Pakistan

Nota bene: A binomial authority or trinomial authority in parentheses indicates that the species or subspecies was originally described in a genus other than Chamaeleo.

== Fossils ==
Image	Scientific name	Distribution
	†Chamaeleo caroliquarti Moody & Rocek, 1980	Czech Republic (Miocene)
	†Chamaeleo intermedius Hillenius, 1978	Kenya (Miocene)
