= Chamaeleo necasi =

Conservation status
- Data Deficient (IUCN 3.1)

Scientific classification
- Kingdom: Animalia
- Phylum: Chordata
- Class: Reptilia
- Order: Squamata
- Suborder: Iguania
- Family: Chamaeleonidae
- Genus: Chamaeleo
- Species: C. necasi

Binomial name
- Chamaeleo necasi Ullenbruch, P. Krause & Böhme, 2007
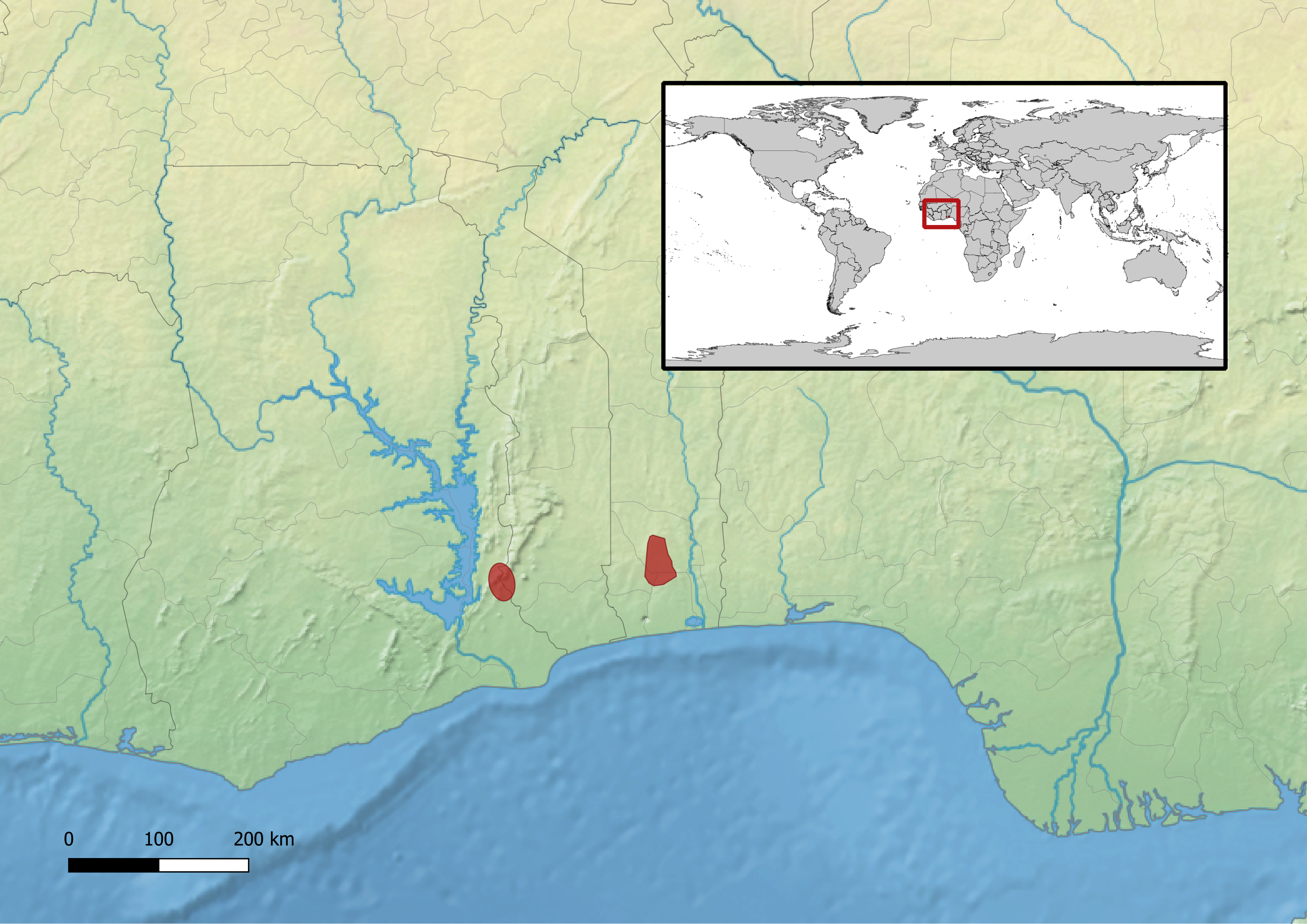

Species of lizard

Chamaeleo necasi, also known commonly as Necas's chameleon or Necas' chameleon, is a species of lizard in the family Chamaeleonidae. The species is native to West Africa.

== Etymology ==
The specific name, necasi, is in honor of Czech herpetologist Petr Nečas.

== Geographic distribution ==
Chamaeleo necasi is found in Benin and Togo.

== Habitat ==
The preferred natural habitat of Chamaeleo necasi is forest, at elevations up to 500 m (1,600 ft).

== Reproduction ==
Chamaeleo necasi is oviparous.
