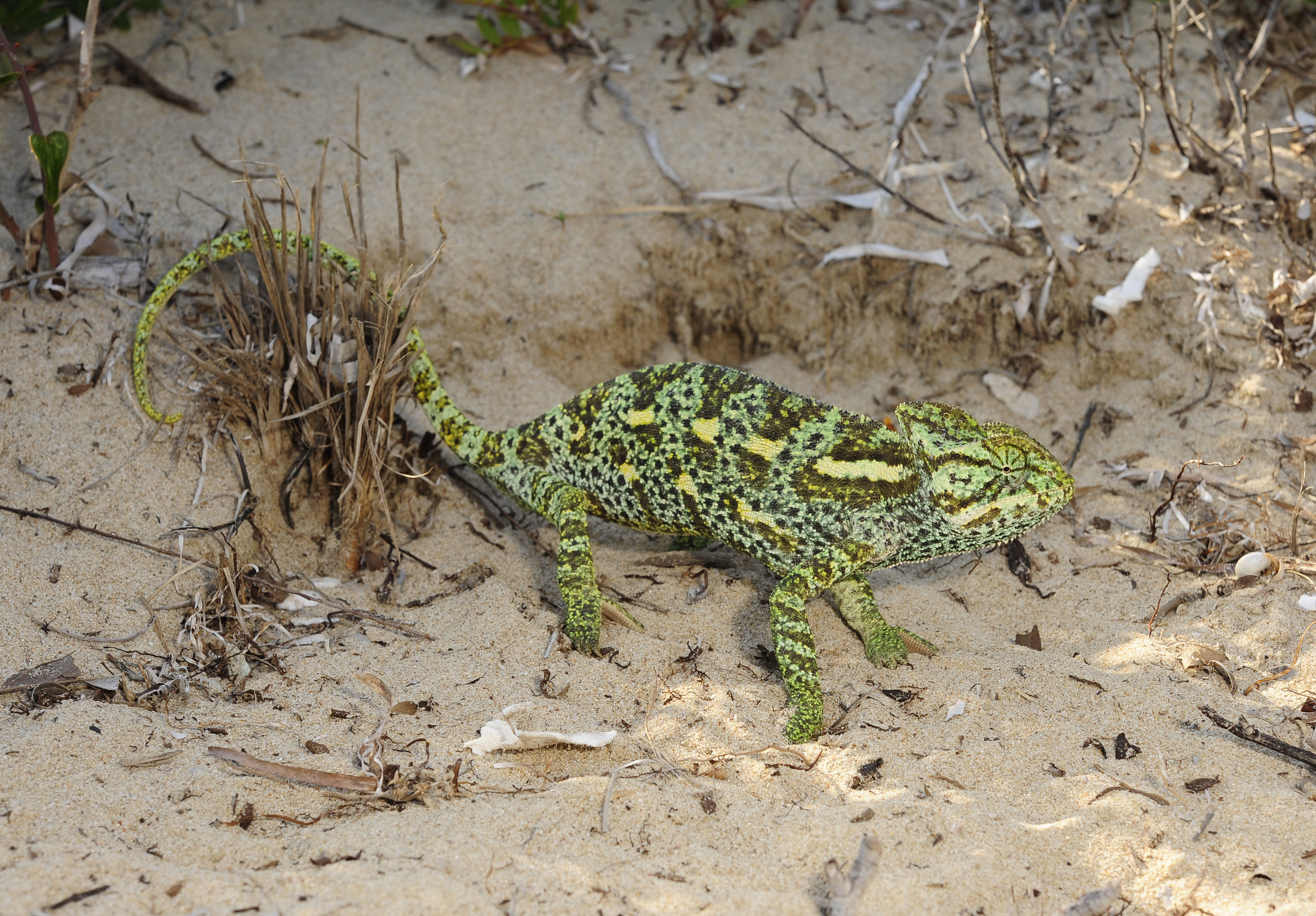

Conservation status
- Least Concern (IUCN 3.1)

Scientific classification
- Kingdom: Animalia
- Phylum: Chordata
- Class: Reptilia
- Order: Squamata
- Suborder: Iguania
- Family: Chamaeleonidae
- Genus: Chamaeleo
- Species: C. africanus

Binomial name
- Chamaeleo africanus Laurenti, 1768
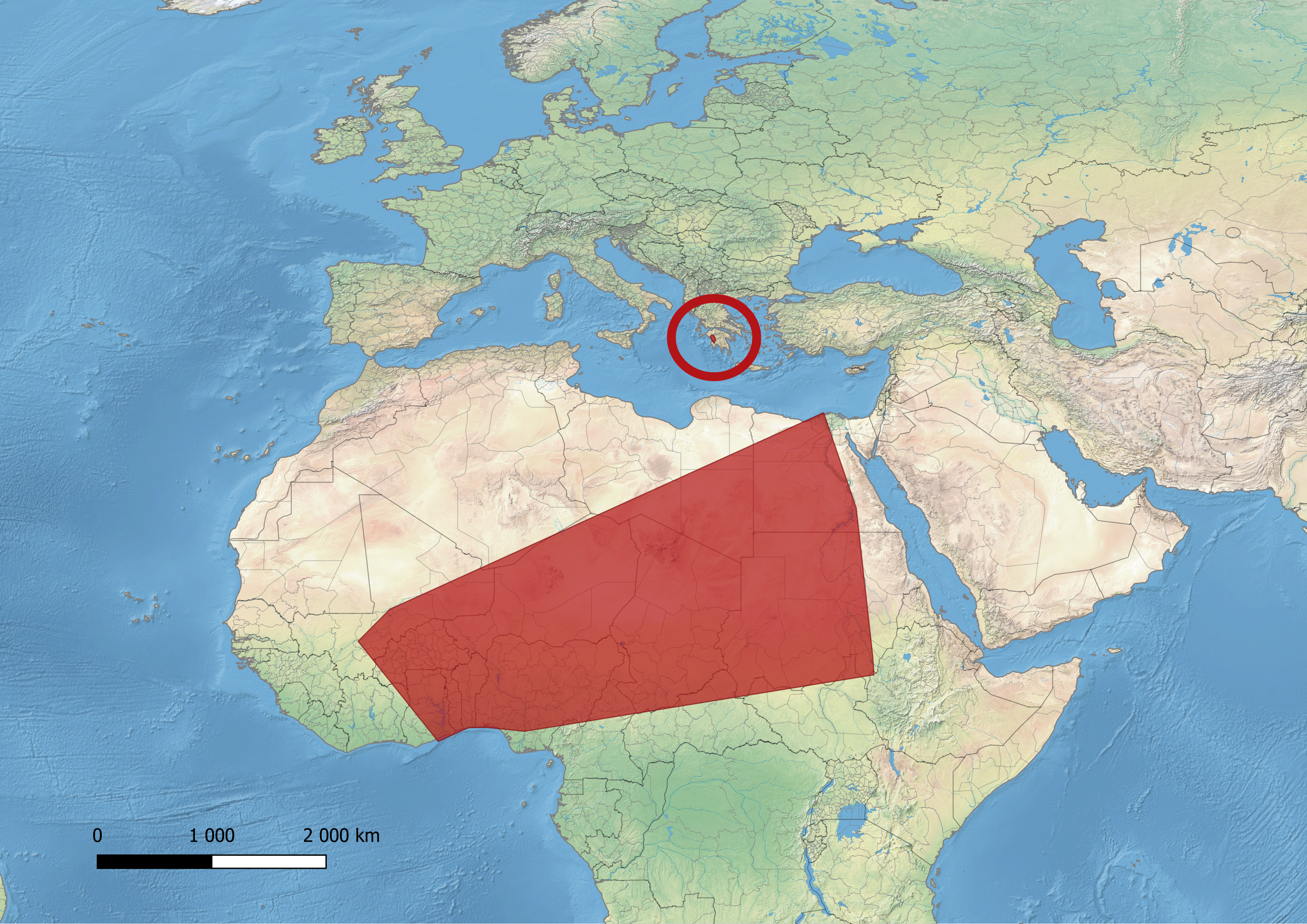

Synonyms
- Chamaeleo basiliscus Cope, 1868

= African chameleon =

Species of lizard

Silent movie from a zoo. Raymond L. Ditmars?, 1915. Collection EYE Film Institute Netherlands.

The African chameleon, basilisk chameleon, or Sahel chameleon (Chamaeleo africanus) is a species of chameleon native to the Sahel and Nile Valley, with an introduced population present in Greece. An average size may be around 34 cm (13 in) long, including its tail.

== Range ==
Chamaeleo africanus is found in much of the Sahel, from Mali and Mauritania to Sudan. Its range also extends north along the Nile to Egypt, although it might have been introduced there. From Egypt, the species has been brought to the Peloponnese. It lives in dry savanna.

== Description ==
The African chameleon is a slow-moving, laterally flattened species growing to a maximum length of 46 cm (18 in). It has bulbous eyes which can move independently of each other and a prehensile tail. It is very similar in appearance to the common chameleon (Chamaeleo chamaeleon) but has no flaps at the back of its head and is rather larger. It is often green with many black spots, but like other chameleons, is capable of changing its colour. It has a large bony casque on its head. It has long limbs, and the male has tarsal spurs.

== Behaviour ==
The African chameleon is usually found on the lower branches of trees, on shrubs and on reeds (Phragmites). It grasps its support with its four-toed feet, a pair of toes on either side of the branch, and its tail, and remains stationary or advances slowly and stealthily. It feeds mainly on insects which it catches by suddenly extending its sticky-tipped tongue. It may also eat small lizards or fledgling birds. The female descends to the ground to breed and lays a clutch of up to seventy eggs in an underground nest. These take about three months to hatch and the young chameleons take a year or more to reach maturity.
