= Chamaeleo calcaricarens =

Conservation status
- Least Concern (IUCN 3.1)

Scientific classification
- Kingdom: Animalia
- Phylum: Chordata
- Class: Reptilia
- Order: Squamata
- Suborder: Iguania
- Family: Chamaeleonidae
- Genus: Chamaeleo
- Species: C. calcaricarens

Binomial name
- Chamaeleo calcaricarens Böhme, 1985
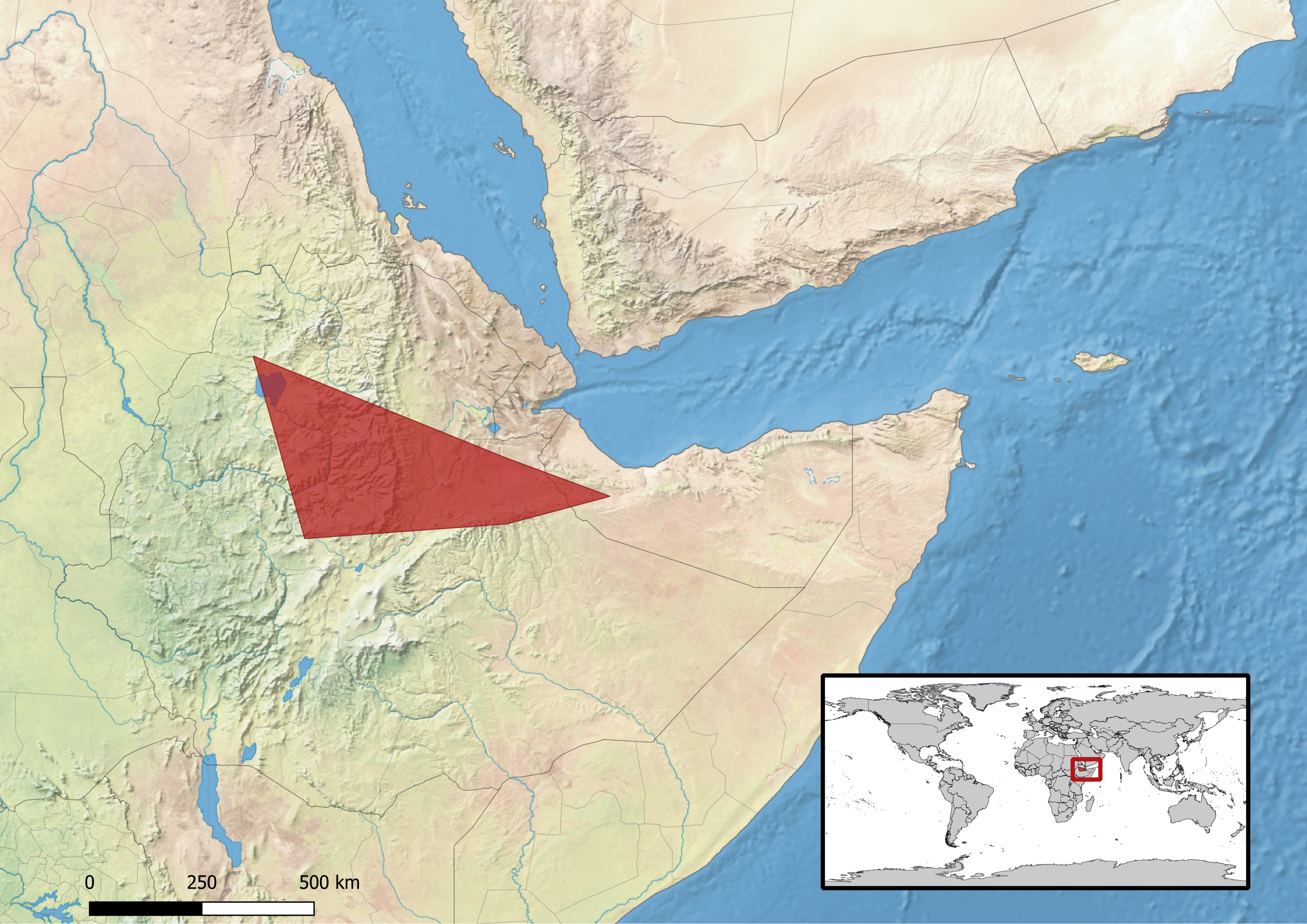

Species of lizard

Chamaeleo calcaricarens is a species of chameleon found in Ethiopia, Eritrea, Djibouti, and Somalia.
