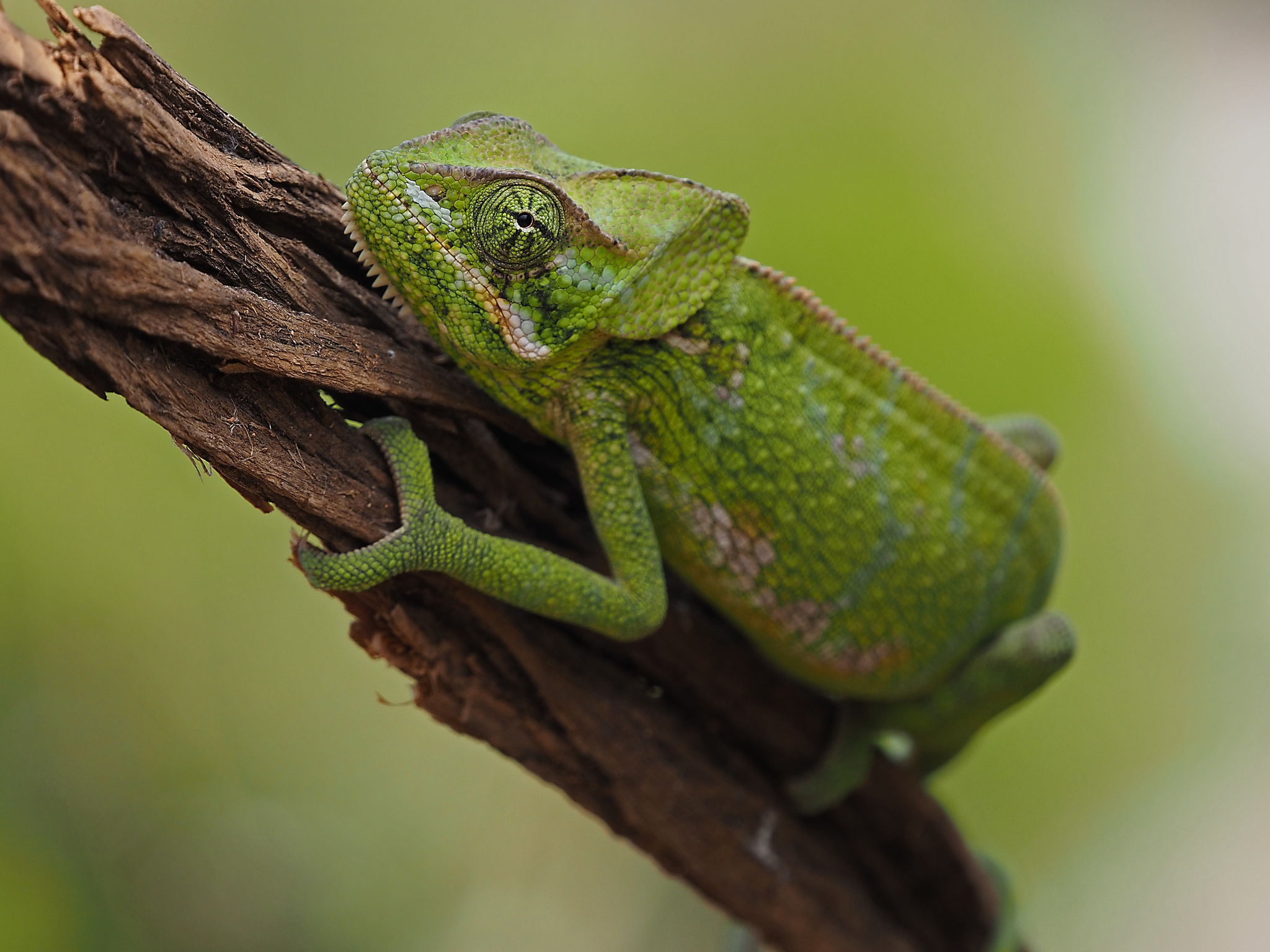

Conservation status
- Near Threatened (IUCN 3.1)

Scientific classification
- Kingdom: Animalia
- Phylum: Chordata
- Class: Reptilia
- Order: Squamata
- Suborder: Iguania
- Family: Chamaeleonidae
- Genus: Chamaeleo
- Species: C. monachus

Binomial name
- Chamaeleo monachus Gray, 1865
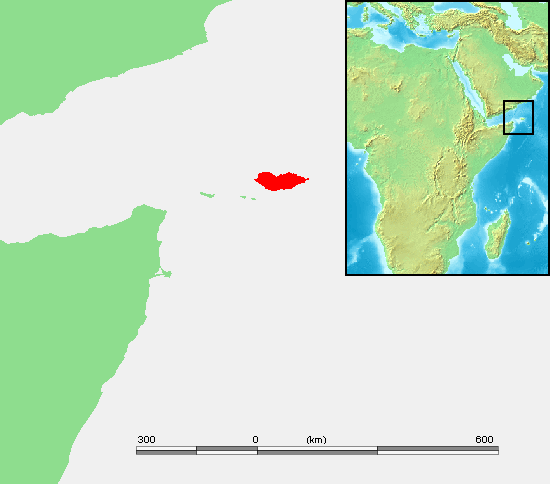
- Range of Socotran chameleon

= Chamaeleo monachus =

Socotran chameleon

Species of lizard

The Socotran chameleon (Chamaeleo monachus) is a species of chameleon endemic to the island of Socotra. When alarmed, it makes a hissing noise, and depending on its mood, it may change color. It is endangered by overgrazing, and is listed as Near Threatened by the IUCN Red List. The Socotran chameleon lives in dense shrubland, along wadis, and sometimes in palm plantations.

== Taxonomy ==
Chamaeleo monachus was first scientifically described by John Edward Gray around 1865; however, he incorrectly identified Madagascar as the type locality. It was not until 1880, when Isaac Bayley Balfour led the first scientific expedition on Socotra, was the correct locality of the species identified.
