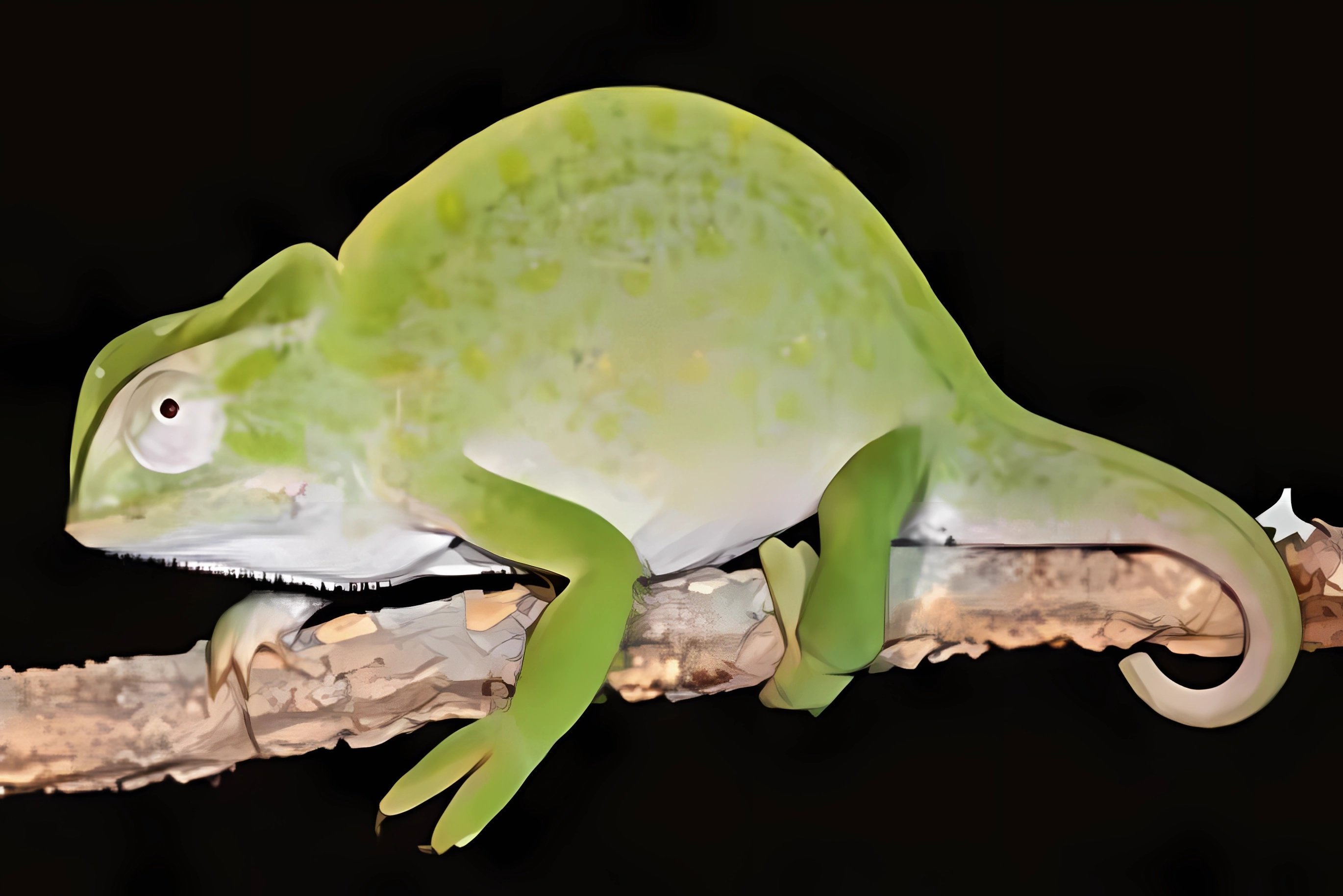

Conservation status
- Least Concern (IUCN 3.1)

Scientific classification
- Kingdom: Animalia
- Phylum: Chordata
- Class: Reptilia
- Order: Squamata
- Suborder: Iguania
- Family: Chamaeleonidae
- Genus: Chamaeleo
- Species: C. anchietae

Binomial name
- Chamaeleo anchietae Bocage, 1872

= Chamaeleo anchietae =

Species of lizard

Chamaeleo anchietae, the double-scaled chameleon, is a species of chameleon found in Angola, Democratic Republic of the Congo and Tanzania.
