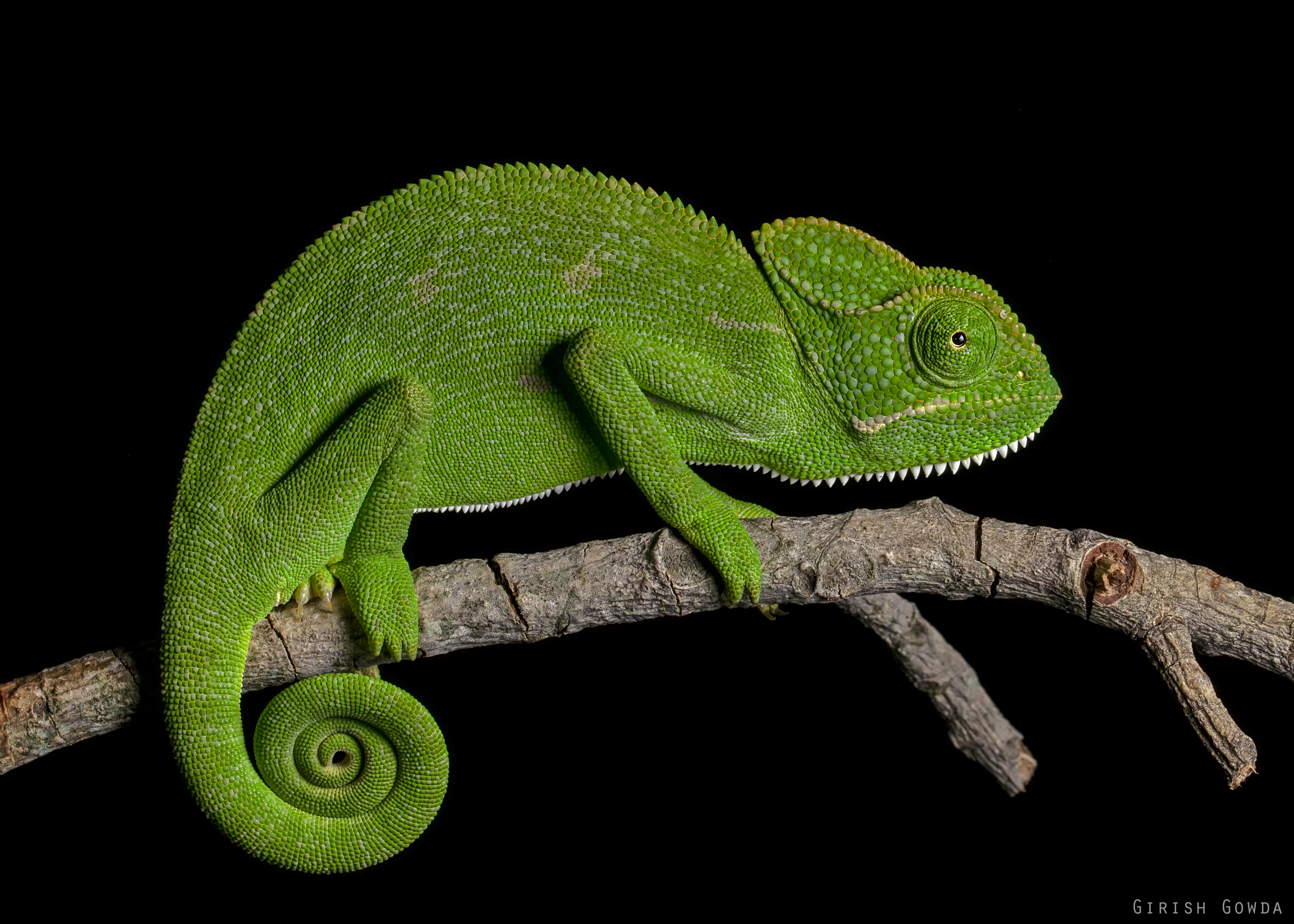
- from Kanakpura, Karnataka, India

Conservation status
- Least Concern (IUCN 3.1)

Scientific classification
- Kingdom: Animalia
- Phylum: Chordata
- Class: Reptilia
- Order: Squamata
- Suborder: Iguania
- Family: Chamaeleonidae
- Genus: Chamaeleo
- Species: C. zeylanicus

Binomial name
- Chamaeleo zeylanicus Laurenti, 1768
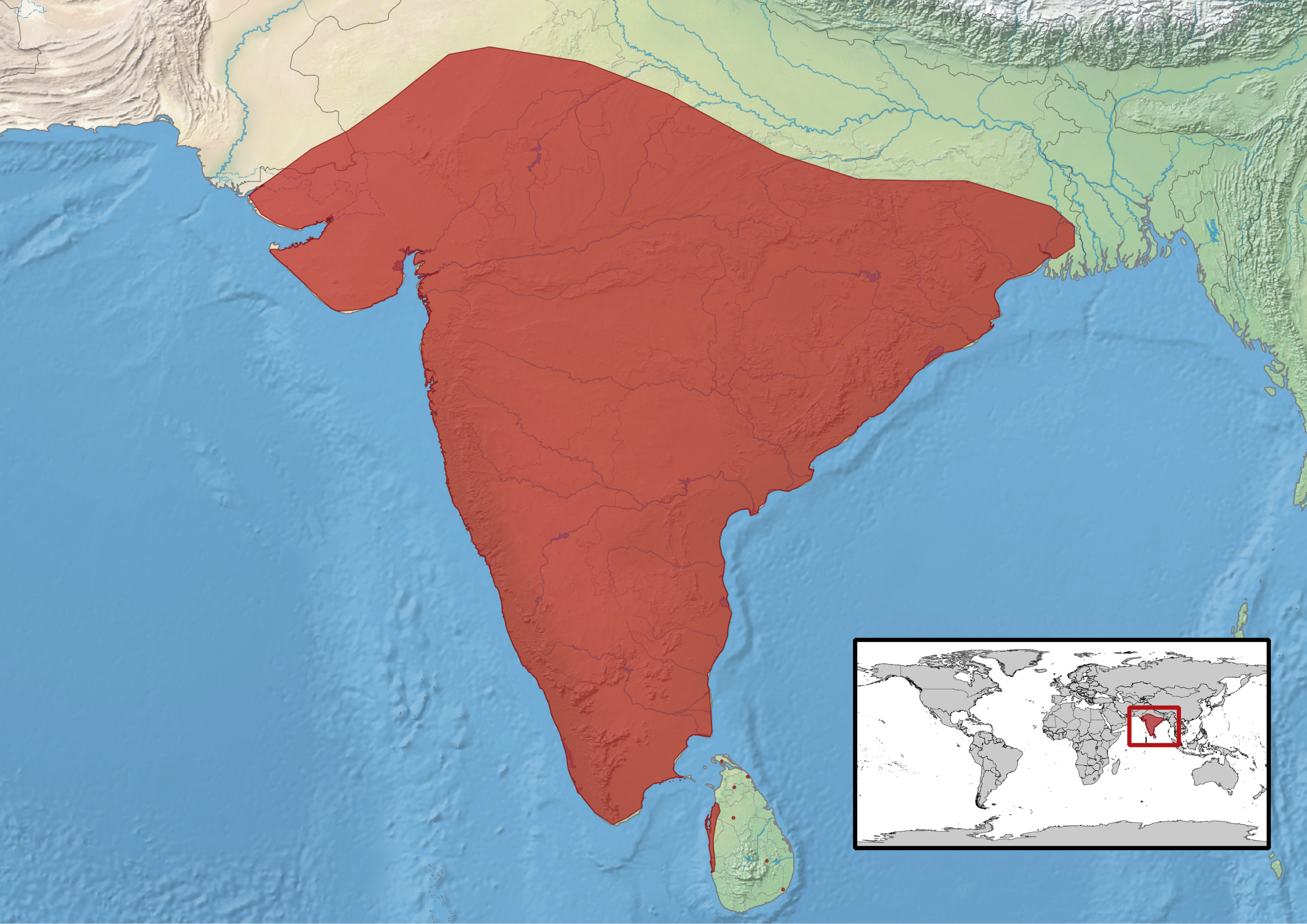

= Indian chameleon =

Species of lizard

The Indian chameleon (Chamaeleo zeylanicus) is a species of chameleon found in Sri Lanka, India, Pakistan and select other parts of South Asia. Like other chameleons, this species moves slowly with a bobbing or swaying movement (attempting to mimic swaying branches) and are usually arboreal. They have an extremely long and sticky tongue, which they use to catch insects from several feet away. Also like other chameleons, C. zeylanicus has bifurcated feet with a tongs-like shape, a prehensile tail, independent eye movement, and the ability to rapidly change skin colouring and patterns. Despite common misconceptions, they do not change their visual appearance based on their surroundings or background, or even for camouflage, and may not even be able to perceive colour differences; rather, it is primarily for communication with others of their species, including to signify the receptiveness of a female (brighter patterns tend to show a willingness to mate) or submissiveness in general disputes (in territorial or male-female disputes, darker hues are often associated with submission, anger or desiring solitude). Additionally, colouring can change for controlling body temperature, changing to darker colours to absorb heat, or lighter to cool themselves.

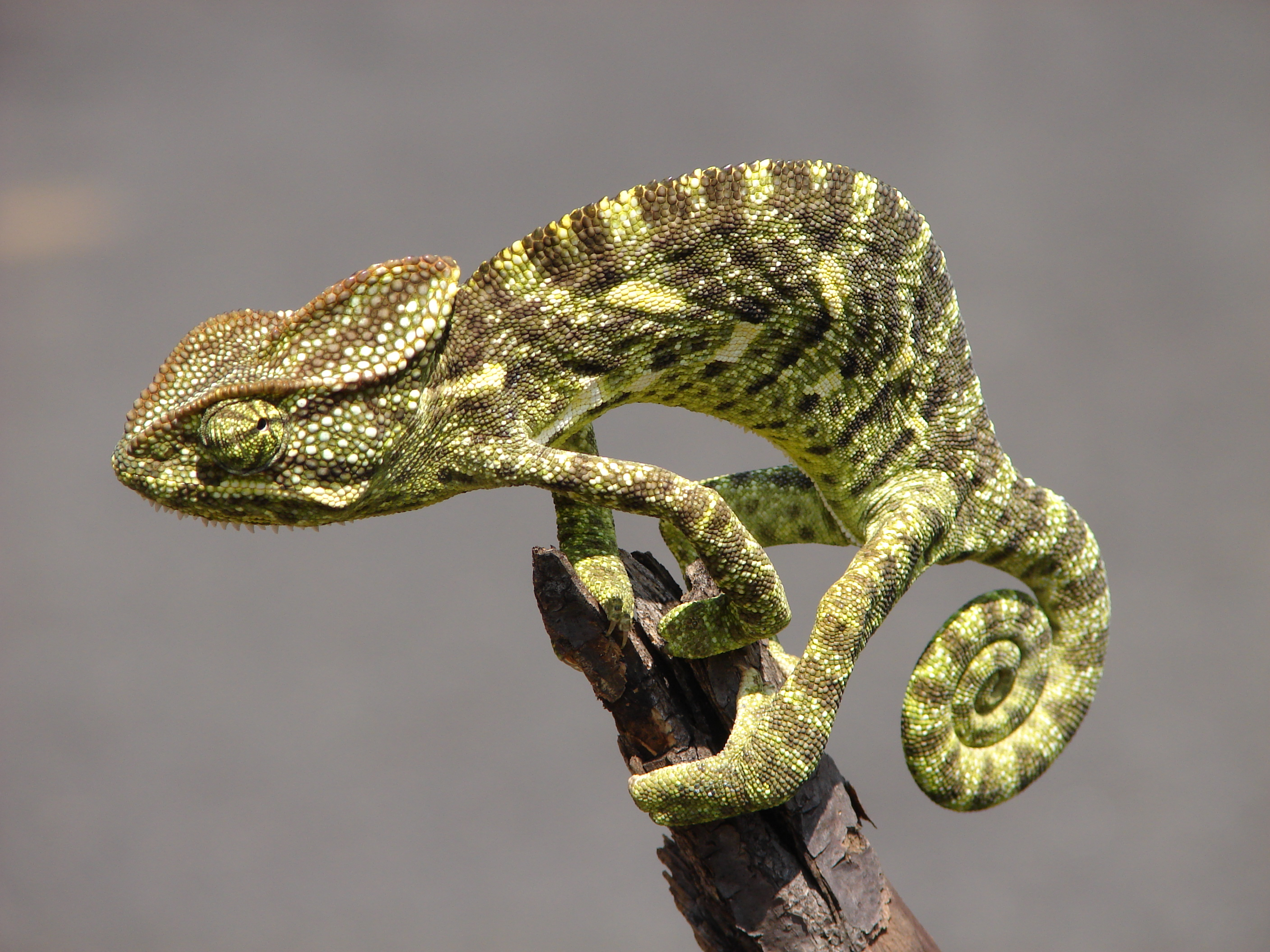
Indian chameleon

== Distribution ==
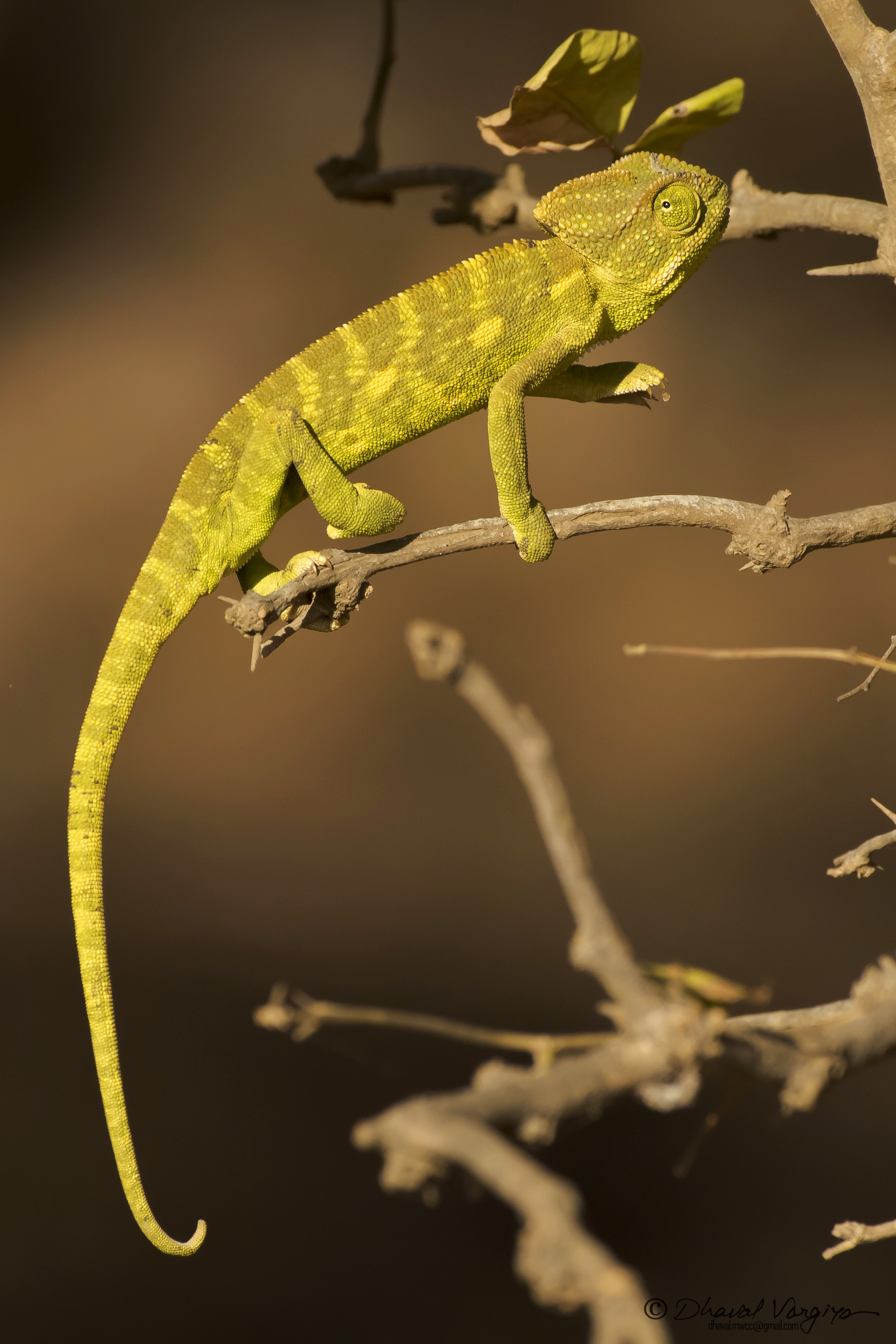
Indian chameleon at Gir Wildlife Sanctuary, Gujarat

They are found throughout much of India south of Ganga river, southeasternmost Pakistan, and parts of Sri Lanka. This makes them widely geographically separated from all other chameleons, which inhabit Africa, the Indian Ocean islands near Africa, southern Europe, and the Arabian Peninsula. Phylogenetic evidence suggests that this unusual distribution is the consequence of oceanic dispersal to India from Arabia during the mid-Miocene.

The type locality is Sri Lanka, restricted by Mertens in 1969.

== Description ==
The head has a bony casque, ornamented with crests or tubercles. A separation between the eyes, the interorbital septum, is present. Its dentition is acrodont; the teeth are compressed, triangular, and more or less distinctly tricuspid. The palate is toothless. The eyes are large, covered by a thick, granular lids pierced with a small central opening for the pupil. No tympanum or external ear is present. The body is compressed, and the neck is very short. The vertebrae are procoelian; abdominal ribs are present. The limbs are long, raising the body. The digits are arranged in bundles of two and three; in the hand, the inner bundle is formed of three, the outer of two digits; it is the reverse in the foot. The tail is prehensile. The head and body are covered with granules or tubercles.

The casque is much elevated posteriorly, with a strong curved parietal crest; the distance between the commissure of the mouth and the extremity of the casque equals or nearly equals the distance between the end of the snout and the hinder extremity of the mandible; no rostral appendages occur; a strong lateral crest, not reaching the end of the parietal crest, is present; an indication of a dermal occipital lobe is found on each side, not reaching the parietal crest. No enlarged tubercles occur on the body; a feebly serrated dorsal crest is present; a series of conical tubercles form a very distinct crest along the throat and belly. Males have a tarsal process or spur, the tail is longer than head and body. The gular-ventral crest and the commissure of the mouth are white.

From snout to vent, it is up to 7 in long, with a prehensile tail of 8 in.
