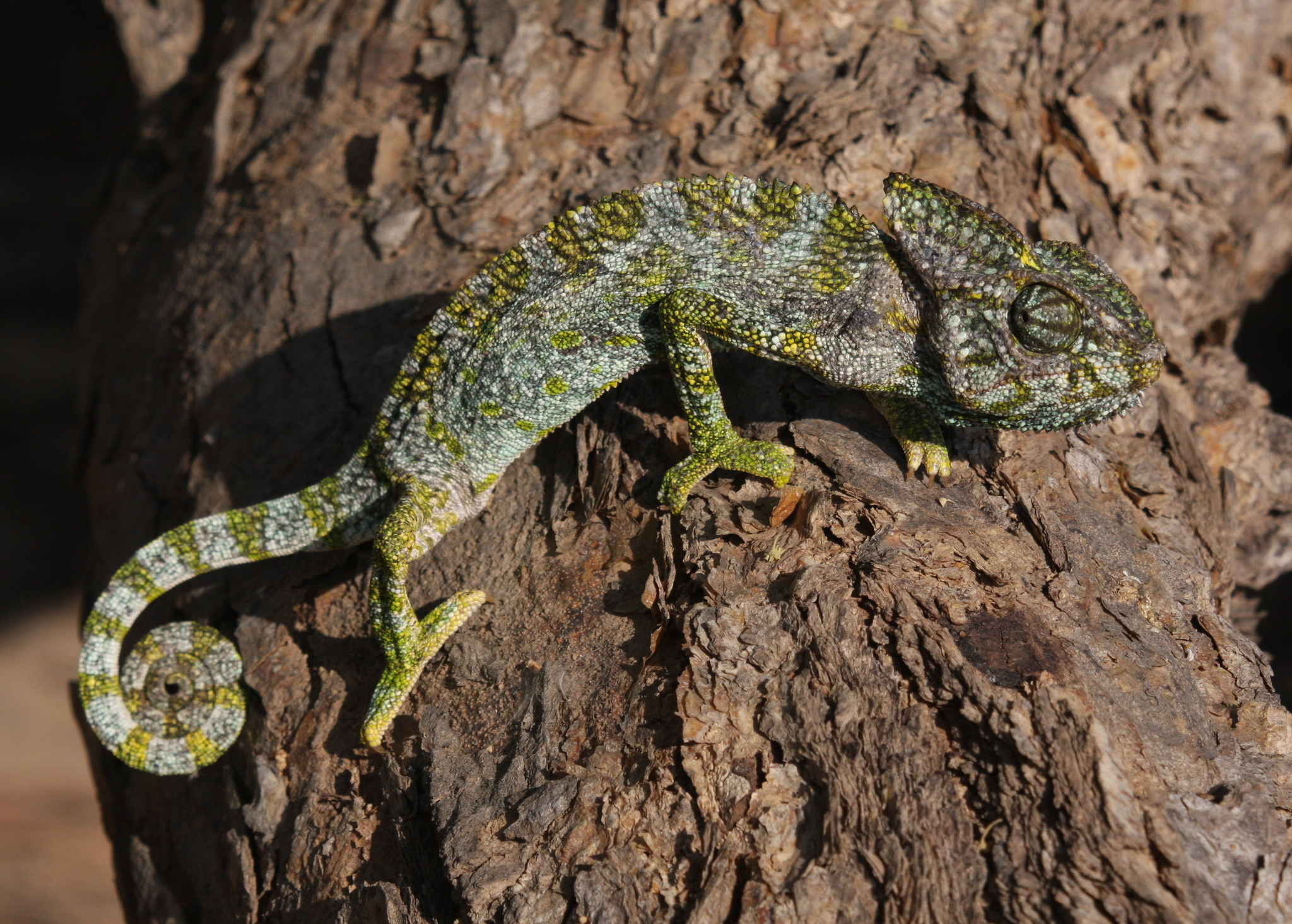

Conservation status
- Least Concern (IUCN 3.1)

Scientific classification
- Kingdom: Animalia
- Phylum: Chordata
- Class: Reptilia
- Order: Squamata
- Suborder: Iguania
- Family: Chamaeleonidae
- Genus: Chamaeleo
- Species: C. arabicus

Binomial name
- Chamaeleo arabicus Matschie, 1893
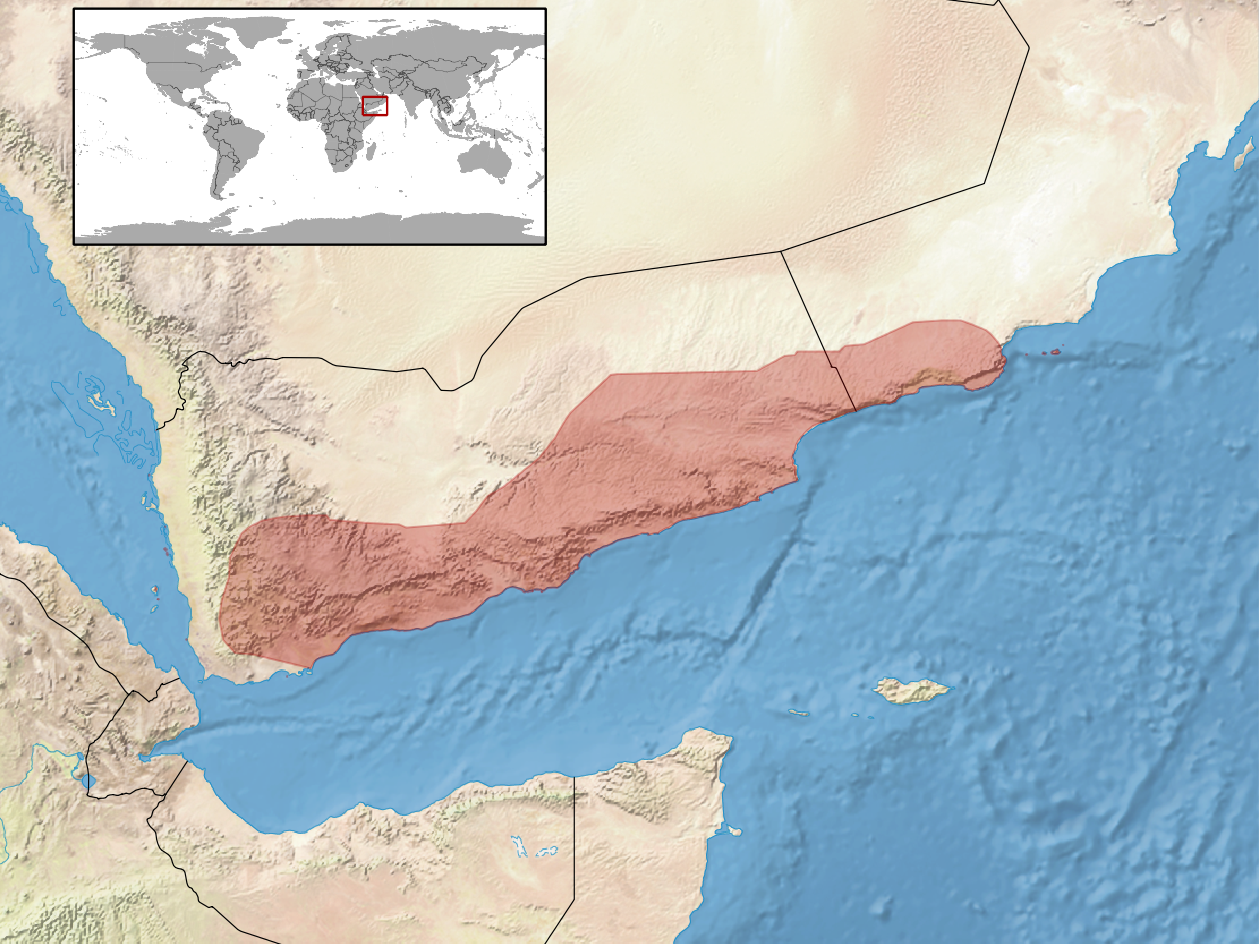
- Arabian chameleon's distribution

= Arabian chameleon =

Species of lizard

The Arabian chameleon (Chamaeleo arabicus) is a species of chameleon native to the southern Arabian Peninsula. During the monsoon season, they turn green.
