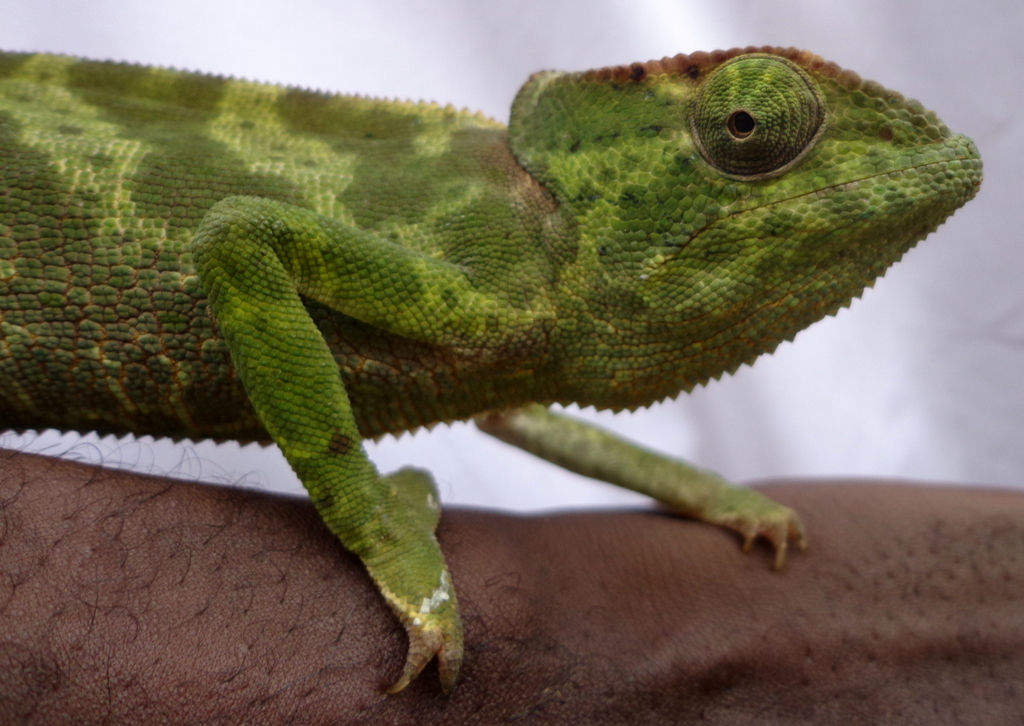
- Chamaeleo gracilis

Conservation status
- Least Concern (IUCN 3.1)

Scientific classification
- Kingdom: Animalia
- Phylum: Chordata
- Class: Reptilia
- Order: Squamata
- Suborder: Iguania
- Family: Chamaeleonidae
- Genus: Chamaeleo
- Species: C. gracilis

Binomial name
- Chamaeleo gracilis Hallowell, 1844
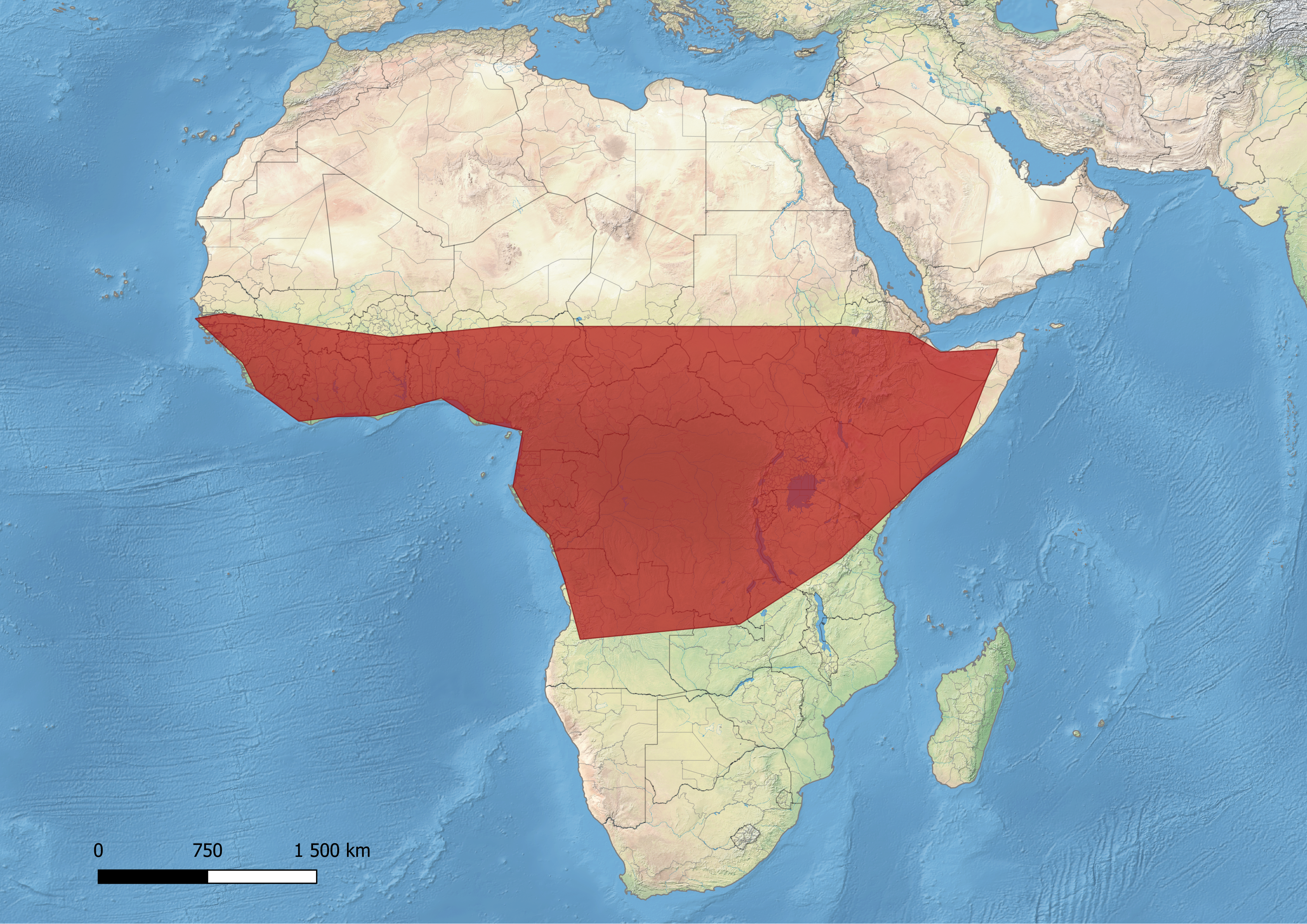

Synonyms
- Chamaeleo gracilis Hallowell, 1844; Chamaeleo burchelli Hallowell, 1856; Chamaeleo granulosus Hallowell, 1856; Chamaeleo simoni Boettger, 1885; Chamaeleon gracilis — Boulenger, 1885; Chamaeleo gracilis — Nečas, 1999

= Graceful chameleon =

Species of lizard

The graceful chameleon (Chamaeleo gracilis) is a species of chameleon native to sub-Saharan Africa. It is commonly around a foot (30.5 cm) long. Because of its abundance, it is heavily exploited by the pet trade.

== Geographic range ==
The graceful chameleon inhabits much of sub-Saharan Africa, from Senegal in the west to Angola in the south and Ethiopia in the east. It mostly lives in forests, though it tolerates bushy areas near plantations and savanna.

== Description ==
C. gracilis is often green, yellow, or brown, with a green stripe on its side. Although it is usually a foot (30.5 cm) in total length (including tail), it can grow up to 15 inches (38 cm) in total length.

== Behavior ==
The graceful chameleon is diurnal; it hunts for prey during the morning and evening, while it rests in the shade during the hottest part of the day. Males are very territorial, and often threaten each other with colorful displays. It eats insects, and can live up to 10 years in captivity.

== Reproduction ==
C. gracilis breeds twice per year, once in the dry season and again at the end of the wet season. 20 to 50 eggs are laid per clutch.

== Subspecies ==
Two subspecies are recognized as being valid, including the nominotypical subspecies.

- Chamaeleo gracilis etiennei Schmidt, 1919
- Chamaeleo gracilis gracilis Hallowell, 1844

== Etymology ==
The subspecific name, etiennei, is in honor of Belgian physician and entomologist "Dr. Etienne" who assisted the Congo Expedition of the American Museum of Natural History.
