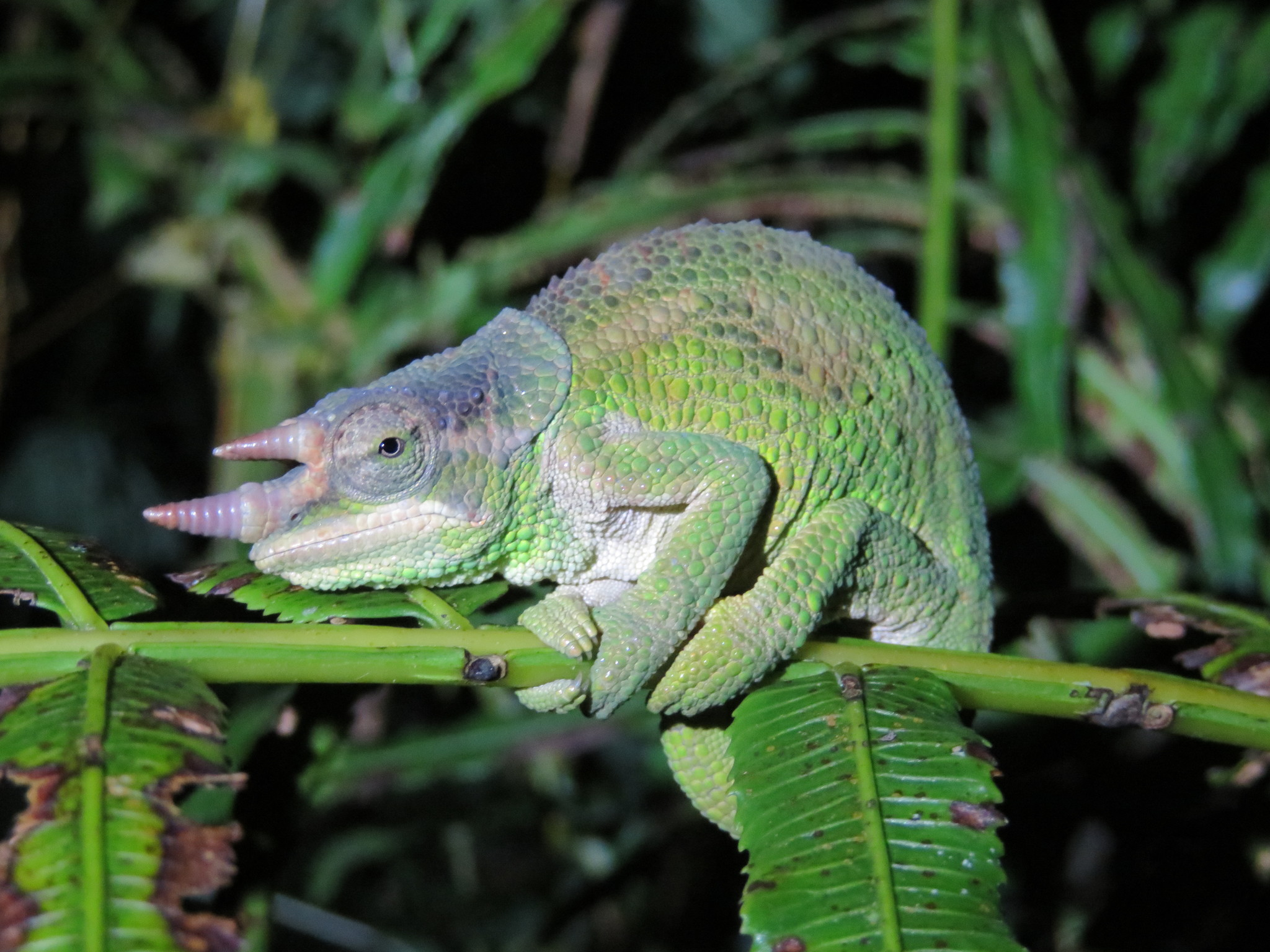

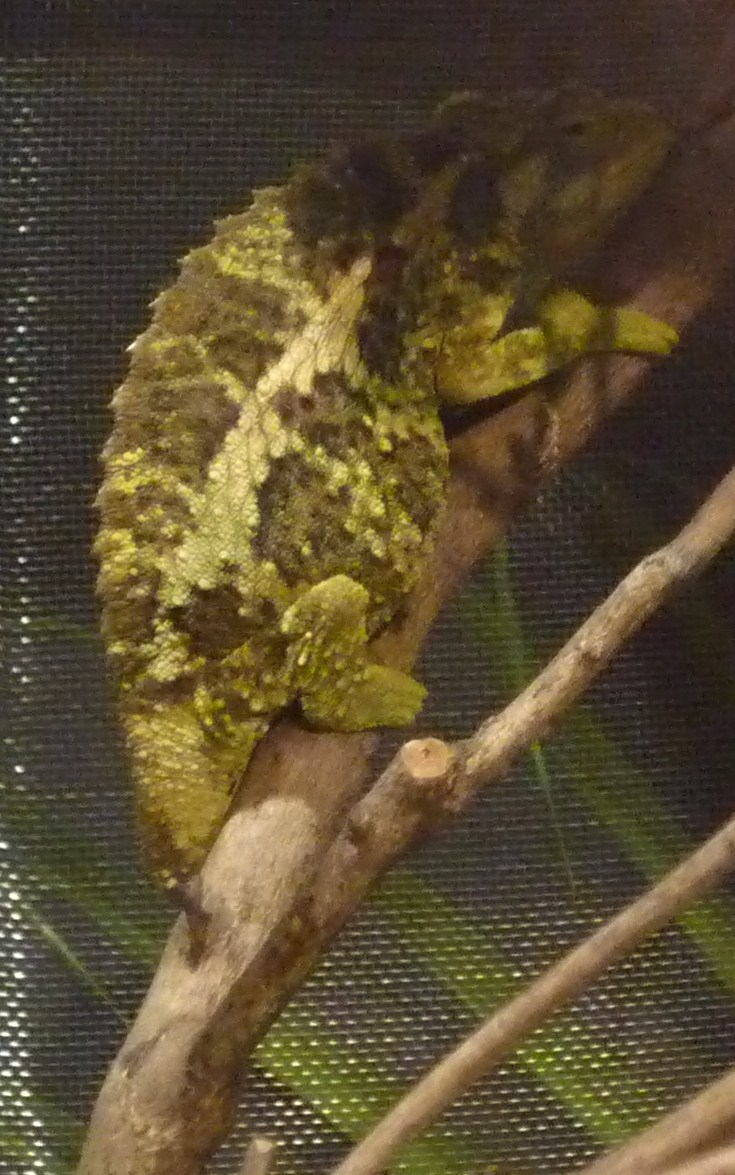
- Male (top), female (bottom)

Conservation status
- Least Concern (IUCN 3.1)

Scientific classification
- Kingdom: Animalia
- Phylum: Chordata
- Class: Reptilia
- Order: Squamata
- Suborder: Iguania
- Family: Chamaeleonidae
- Genus: Trioceros
- Species: T. werneri

Binomial name
- Trioceros werneri (Tornier, 1899)

= Trioceros werneri =

Species of lizard

Trioceros werneri, the Wemer's chameleon or Wemer's three-horned chameleon, is a species of chameleon that is endemic to forests and nearby gardens at altitudes of 1,700–2,600 m (5,600–8,500 ft) in the Eastern Arc Mountains of Tanzania. The adult male has three distinct "horns", whereas the female has no or only a single short horn on the nose. Like many (but not all) Trioceros species of highlands, the female T. werneri does not lay eggs, but instead gives birth to live young, typically 15–20 at a time.

== Taxonomy ==
The three long annulated horns in the male T. werneri makes it superficially similar to T. jacksonii and T. johnstoni, and to extent also to the short-horned T. fuelleborni and the smooth-horned T. oweni, but they are not close relatives.

Although currently recognized as a single relatively widespread species, it is considered likely that T. werneri is a species complex and a taxonomic review is necessary.
