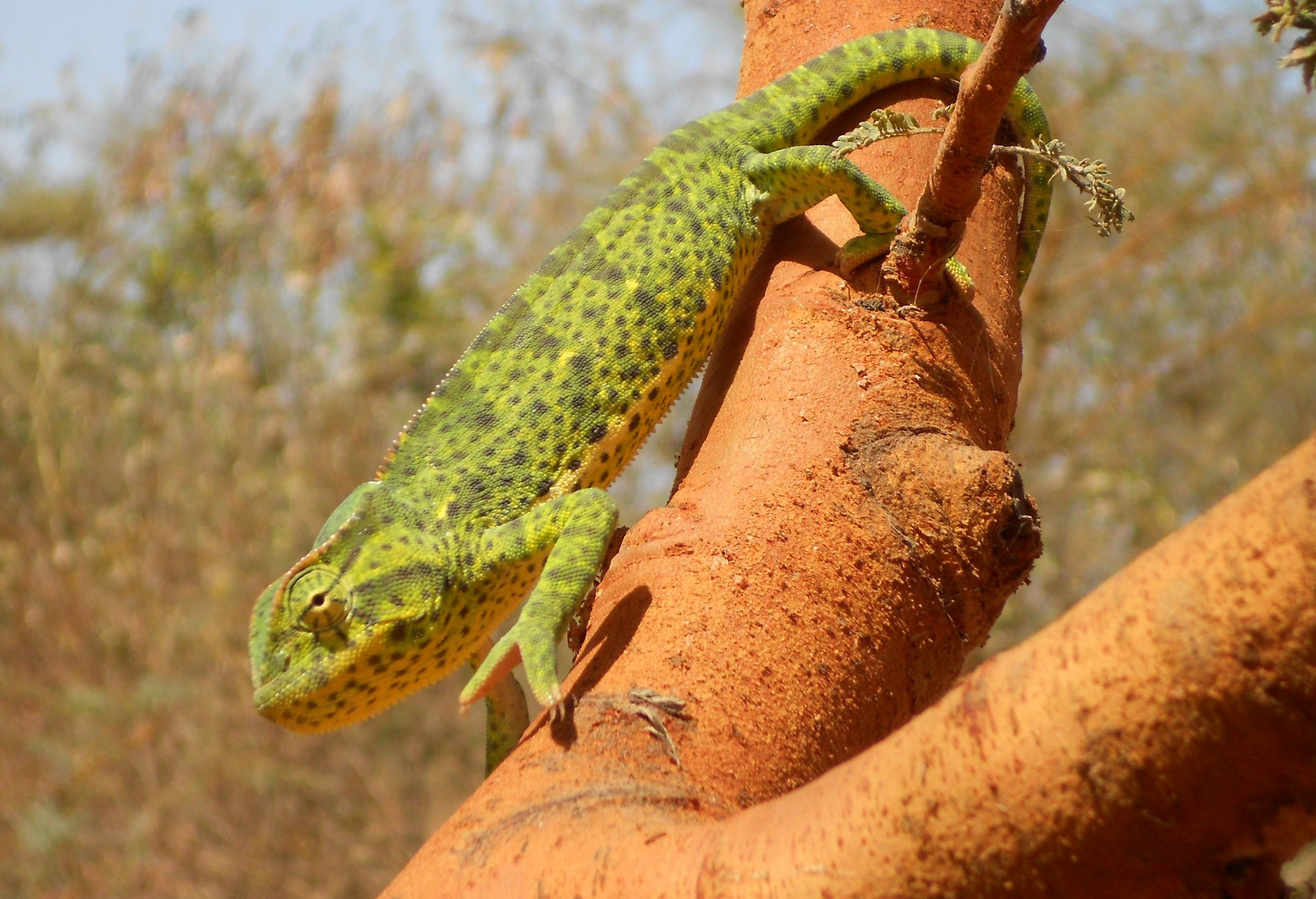
- Chamaeleo senegalensis on a tree branch in Senegal

Conservation status
- Least Concern (IUCN 3.1)

Scientific classification
- Kingdom: Animalia
- Phylum: Chordata
- Class: Reptilia
- Order: Squamata
- Suborder: Iguania
- Family: Chamaeleonidae
- Genus: Chamaeleo
- Species: C. senegalensis

Binomial name
- Chamaeleo senegalensis Daudin, 1802
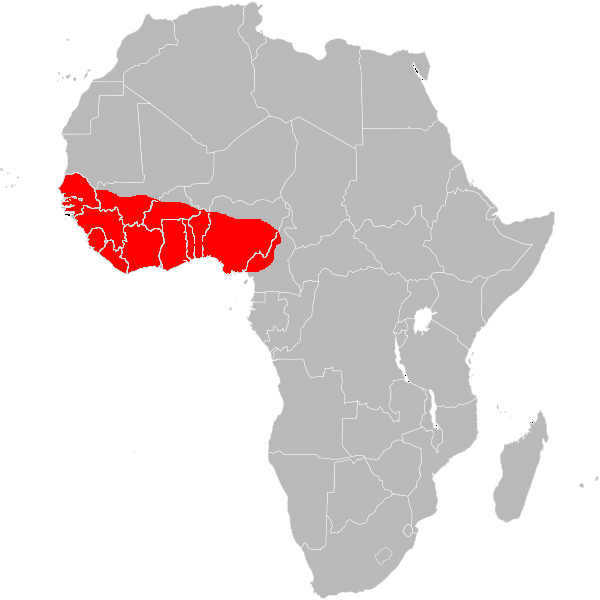
- Range of Senegal chameleon

= Senegal chameleon =

Species of lizard

The Senegal chameleon (Chamaeleo senegalensis) is a species of chameleon native to West Africa. Its range includes Senegal, Mali, Nigeria, and Cameroon, and it lives in moist savanna. Due to its wide range and unknown population, the Senegal chameleon is listed as Least Concern by the IUCN Red List. However, it may be threatened by the pet trade. The Senegal chameleon is usually olive brown, and ranges from 20 to 30 cm in length, although the male is usually smaller.

== Gallery ==
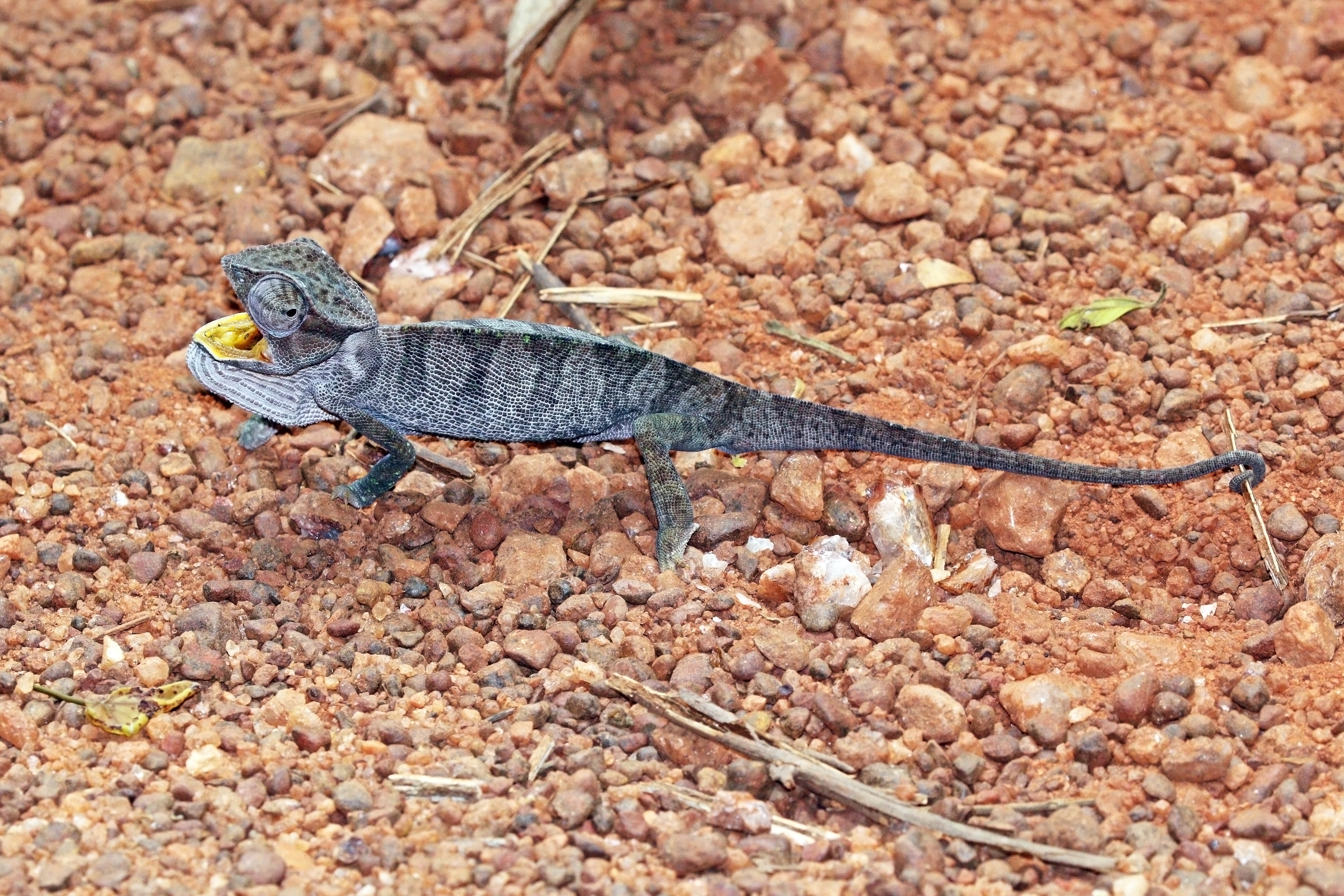
Chamaeleo senegalensis in the Bobiri Forest, Ghana

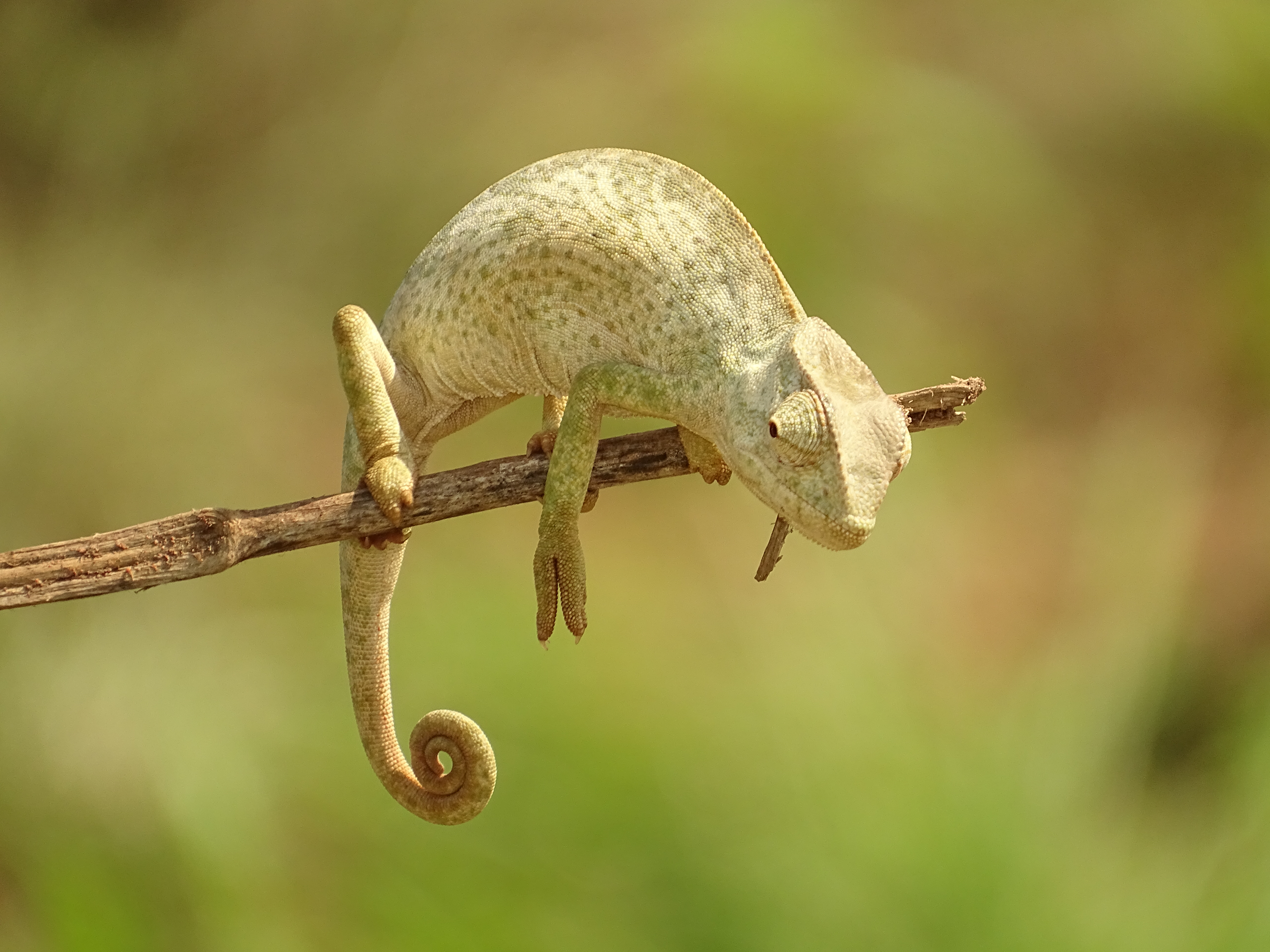
Chamaeleo senegalensis in Pendjari National Park

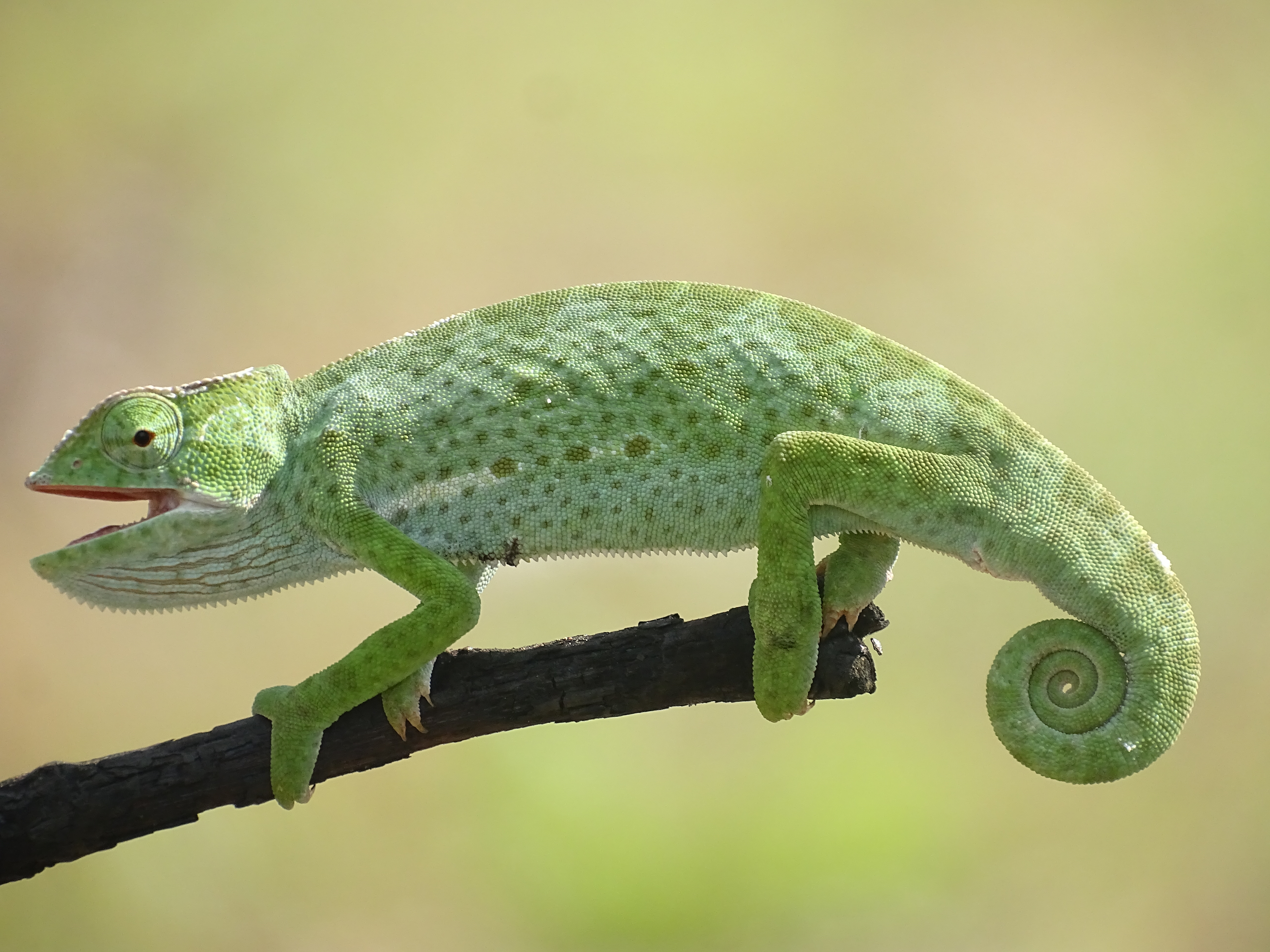
Senegal chameleon in Pendjari National Park in Benin.
