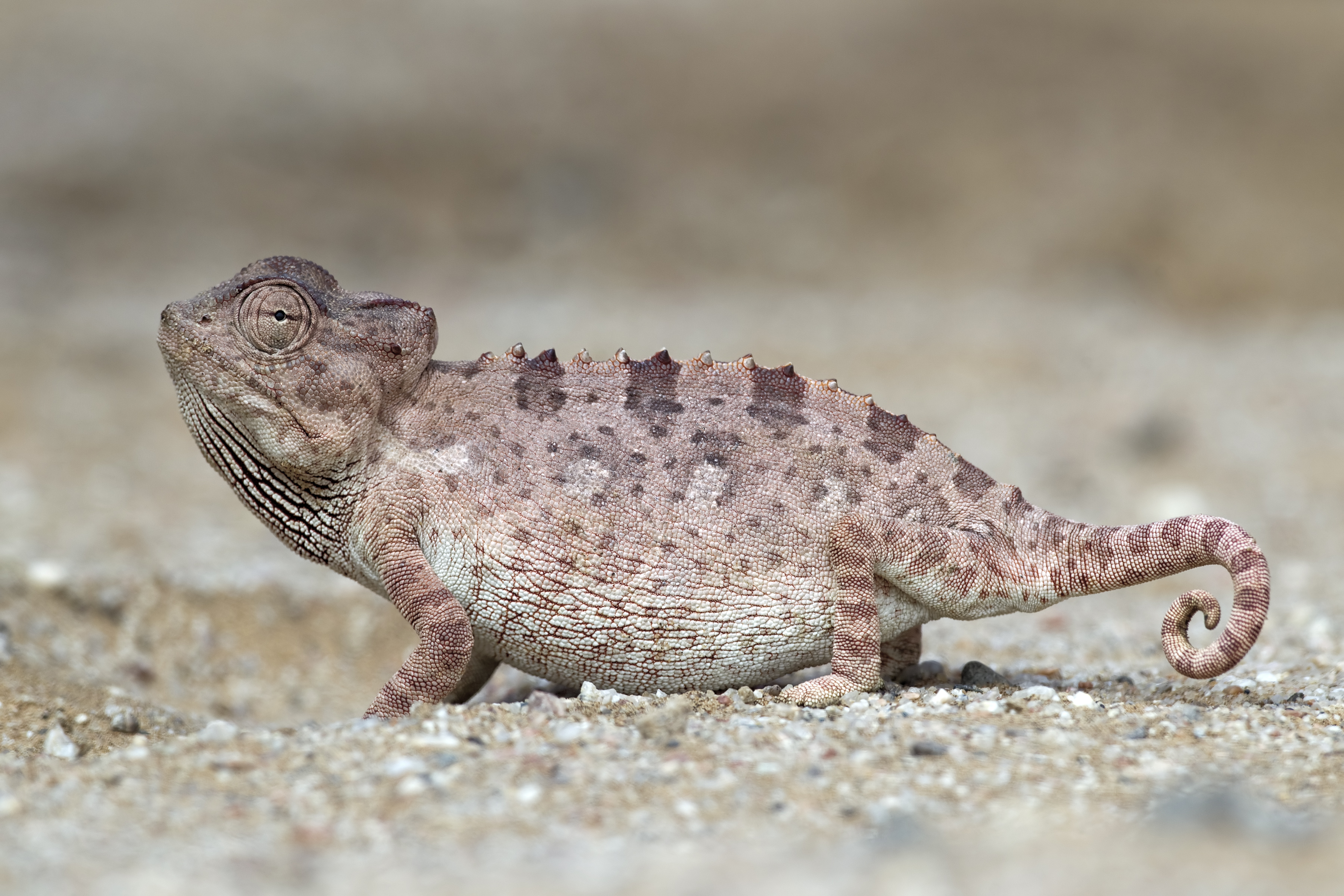

Conservation status
- Least Concern (IUCN 3.1)

Scientific classification
- Domain: Eukaryota
- Kingdom: Animalia
- Phylum: Chordata
- Class: Reptilia
- Order: Squamata
- Suborder: Iguania
- Family: Chamaeleonidae
- Genus: Chamaeleo
- Species: C. namaquensis

Binomial name
- Chamaeleo namaquensis Smith, 1831
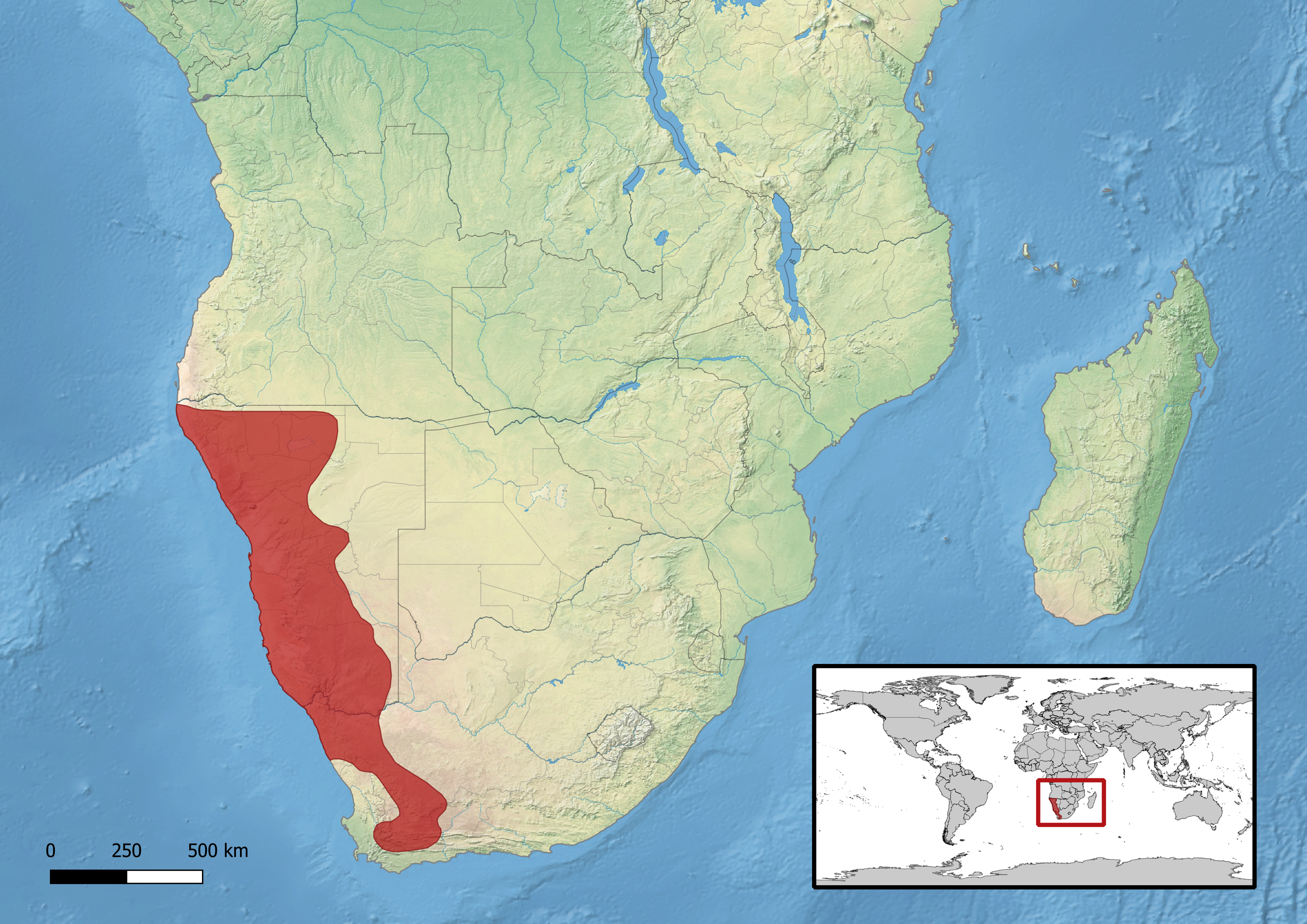

= Namaqua chameleon =

Species of lizard

The Namaqua chameleon (Chamaeleo namaquensis) is a ground-living lizard found in the western desert regions of Namibia, South Africa and southern Angola.

== General anatomy ==
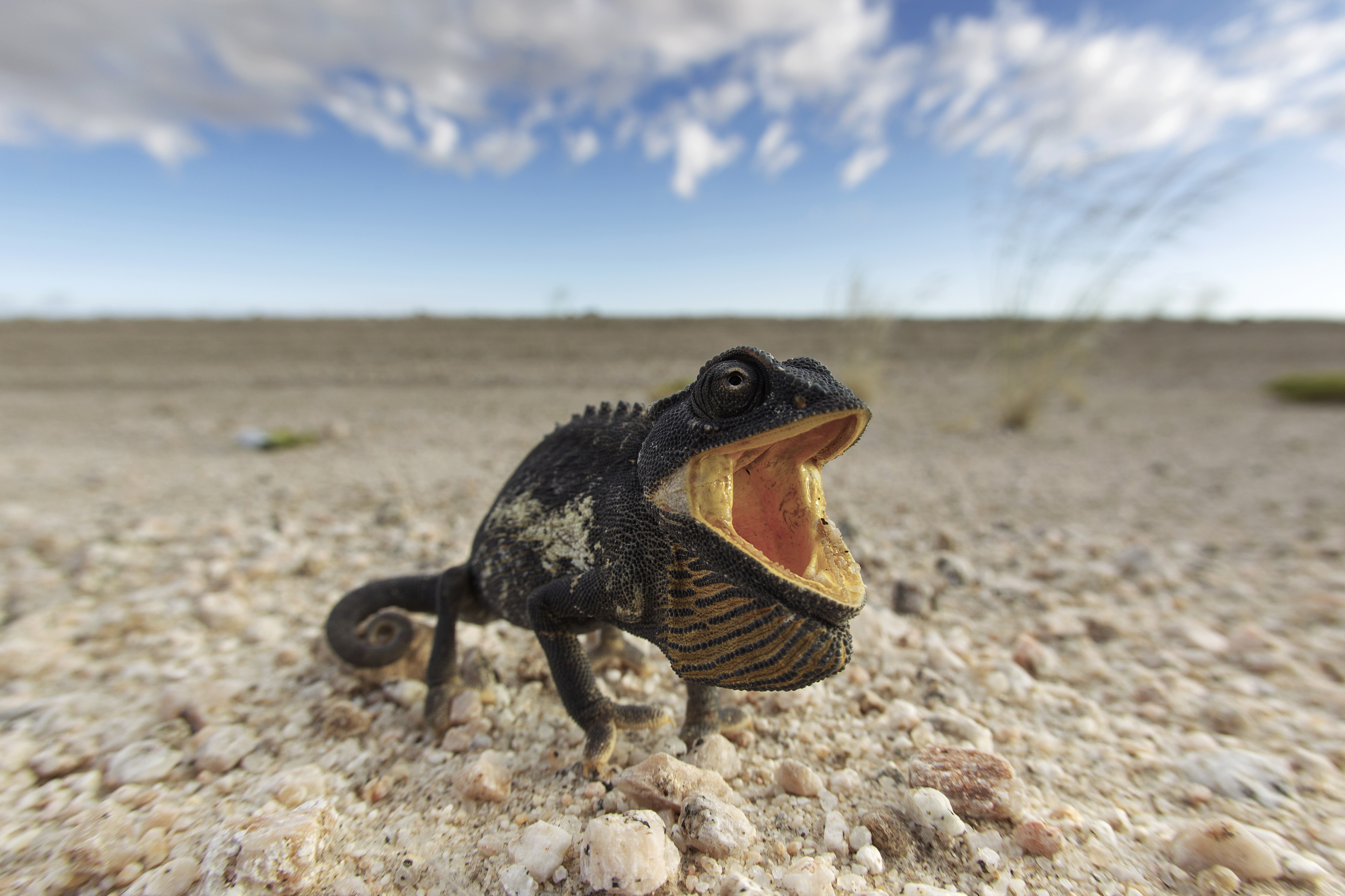
Threat display, Namib-Naukluft National Park

Chamaeleo namaquensis is one of the largest chameleon species in southern Africa, and reaches up to 25 cm in length. Females are larger than males, though the latter are proportionately more robust and have larger heads and head ornamentation, as well as a bulge under the tail base due to the presence of hemipenes. Its tail is far shorter than its body and those of other arboreal chameleons as an adaptation to its primarily terrestrial habitat. It has large dorsal spines and a prominent, pointed casque on the back of its head and lacks the neck flap of other Chamaeleo species. Like many chameleons, this species has nasal salt glands which excretes excess minerals such as sodium chloride and potassium.

It has hygroscopic skin, and shares a feature with some other lizards (such as the thorny devil, Texas horned lizard, Saara hardwickii, and the giant girdled lizard) in that it can drink moisture in contact with its scales through capillary action.

=== Thermoregulation ===
Although capable of changing colour, this chameleon is usually some shade of grey or brown with several lighter patches on the flank, dark patches below the dorsal ridge and yellow or red striping on the throat. This ability aids in thermoregulation, becoming black in the cooler morning to absorb heat more efficiently, then a lighter grey color to reflect light during the heat of the day — or showing both colors at the same time, neatly separated left from right by the spine. Like most desert animals, it is adapted to high environmental temperatures, but can also tolerate periods of low temperatures. Although temperature varies throughout the year, the natural habitat of this species has a yearly average coastal temperature of 19.3 °C in the air, and 26.6-31.8 °C on the substrate surface. Further inland, air temperature averages at 24.1 °C while substrate temperatures average between 30-34.5 °C.

== Distribution ==
This chameleon species occurs naturally throughout the arid western part of southern Africa, and is particularly common in the Namib Desert. It is recorded as far south as Sutherland, in the Western Cape, South Africa, and as far north as southern Angola. In the furthest eastern edge of its range, in eastern Namibia, it overlaps with the natural range of its relative, the flap-necked chameleon.

Within its natural range, it inhabits arid and semi-arid areas, such as Karoo shrubland, sandy desert and gravel plains, even foraging in intertidal zones. It is terrestrial, and is usually seen walking along the ground, although young are often found climbing.

== Behaviour ==
=== Feeding habits ===
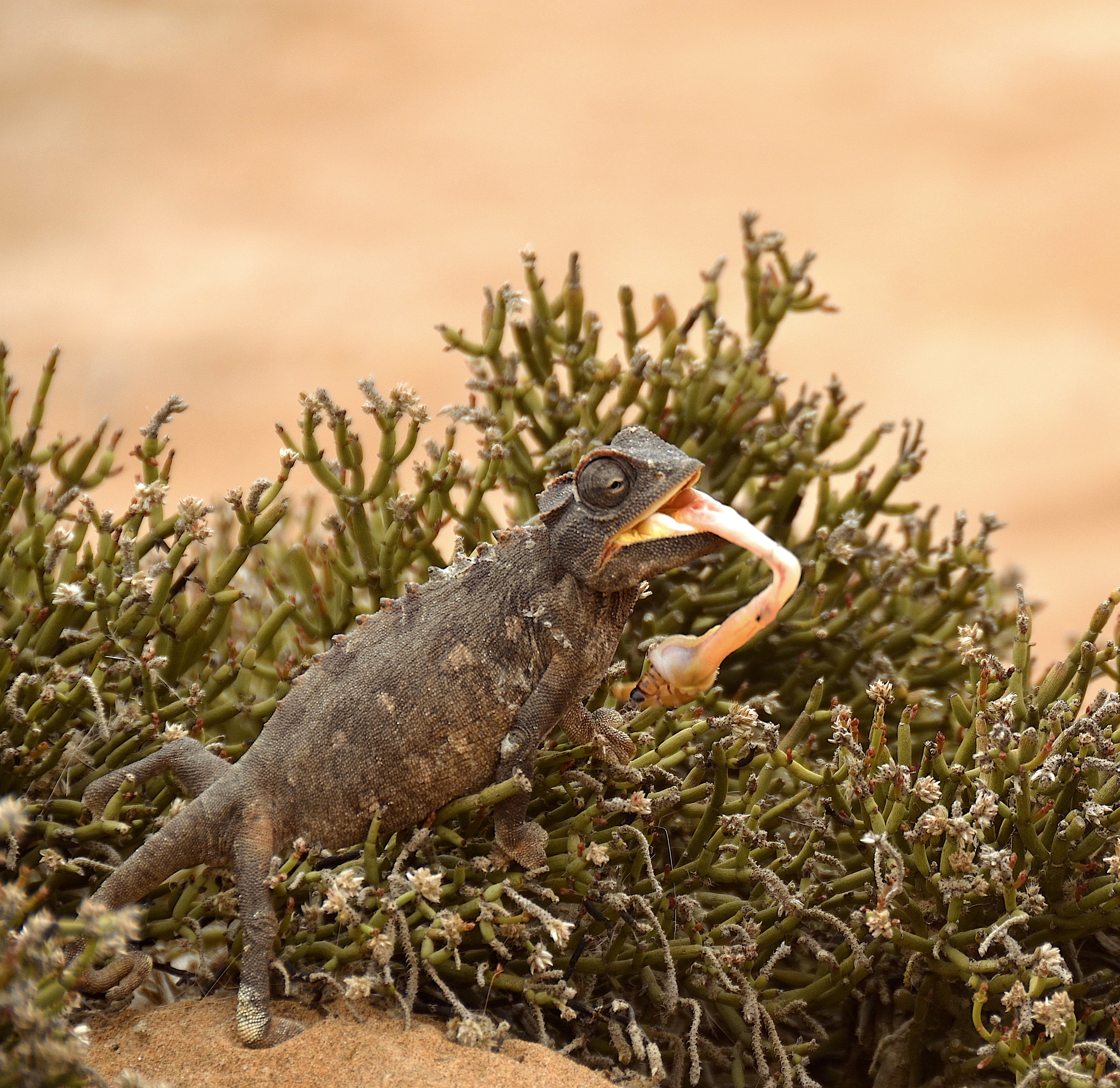
Namaqua chameleon showing long tongue by catching a beetle

Unlike the arboreal chameleons of the genus Chamaeleo, its tail is not prehensile, but otherwise it still hunts in the same way, slowly stalking its prey and catching it with its long tongue. Unusually for a chameleon, they will also chase down prey attempting to flee and will sometimes seize them with their jaws rather than with their tongue. Namaqua chameleons primarily feed on insects, eating mostly tenebrionid beetles and to a lesser extent oedipodine grasshoppers. They will occasionally feed on lizards (including young chameleons of their own species), snakes, and various other arthropods. In one exceptional case, an individual was seen catching and killing a Peringuey's adder twice its own length. They mostly hunt their prey in sandy dunes and rocky areas, but some coastal populations also forage for marine arthropods in intertidal zones, making it the only chameleon species to do so. Although typically feeding on live prey, in captivity they can sometimes be weaned onto dead food items.

When hunting potentially dangerous prey, individuals quickly learn to disable its weapons first (biting the heads of snakes and lizards, the fangs of spiders, the stingers of scorpions and hymenopterans, etc) before finally dispatching and consuming it.

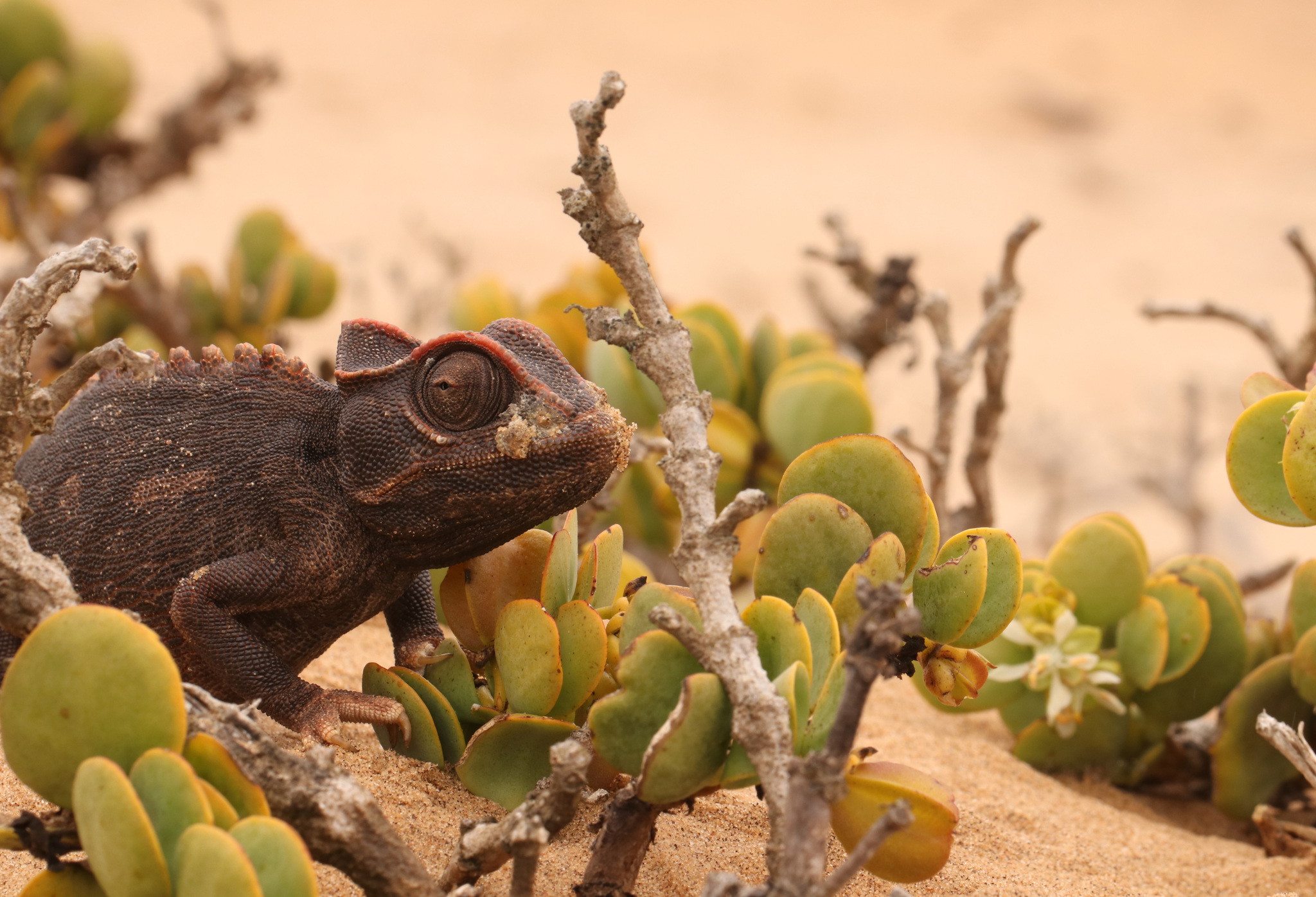
Amongst Zygophyllum stapfii, showing what is potentially nasal potassium salt secretions on the nose.

This species also regularly consumes plant matter in the wild, and is one of several chameleon species recorded doing so. Plant matter may account for up to 29.1% of their diet amongst coastal populations and 20% amongst those inland, although an average of 2.8% for coastal and 1.5% for inland populations are more common. Of plant material, the "fleshy parts" of Zygophyllum stapfii are most commonly eaten. In captivity, plant matter is still consumed, especially succulents, but less frequently than in the wild. This suggests that the species may actually be an omnivorous chameleon, which is further supported by the presence of potassium in the excretions of the nasal glands as is the case with herbivorous lizards.

Inorganic material such as small stones, gravel, and sand are also ingested. They account for as much as 30% of the diet in coastal populations and 1.1% in inland populations, although an average of 6.2% and 0.5% is more common, respectively. It has been suggested that inorganic material may help with digestion or removing parasites. Regarding the former explanation, coastal populations which ingest more plant material also ingest more inorganic material.

This species has a high metabolic rate and is voracious, often feeding until the stomach has been completely filled, and immediately begins feeding again after food has traveled to the small intestine. Individuals in the wild are usually found gorged to the limit; an adult has an average of 12 meals a day, each meal usually consisting of about 19-23 large darkling beetles. This is a reflection of food in the Namib Desert being highly abundant and constantly available; a condition that is difficult to replicate in captivity. As a result, captive individuals do not grow as fast as they do in the wild.

==== Water ====
Water is of critical importance to Namaqua chameleons, which drink dew water and fog condensation on surfaces such as vegetation, rocks, and sand. Heavy fog rolling in from the ocean occurs most days of the year through much of their habitat, being present in the mornings and afternoons, but occasionally persisting through the entire day. They also obtain moisture content from food, especially darkling beetles and plant matter. However, they can also drink water through capillary action; small channels in the scales can transport water across the body. In an experiment, dyed water placed on the side of its body visibly moved to its back and towards the head and tail. The chameleon then turned its head and drank the water that collected on its body.

More unusually for a desert reptile, it has an extraordinarily small bladder that is nearly useless for storing water. Furthermore, little storage space for water is available in the gut as it is typically filled with food. It appears that this is because sufficient water is readily available through regular fogs, food, and the cloaca reabsorbing moisture from urine, the latter which is aided by the salt glands removing excess minerals. Additionally, as a reptile, its rate of loss of water is far lower than in mammals and can also obtain relatively more water from the protein degradation of food. However, this species must have a regular source of drinking water other than its food and humidity in order to survive.

=== Predation ===
Namaqua chameleons are preyed upon by jackals, hawks, and eagles, and possibly monitor lizards. Similar to other chameleon species in areas near human habitation, it falls victim to introduced predators such as domestic cats, dogs and foxes. This species runs fast for a chameleon however and will do so to evade potential danger. It will also defend itself by quickly turning black, inflating the body and gular pouch, hissing, and gaping the bright yellow mouth in an attempt to startle the threat to buy enough time to flee. If cornered, it will charge and try to bite the attacker with its powerful jaws, and if successful, violently rips and tears at the flesh without letting go.

=== Social ===
Namaqua chameleons become fiercely territorial upon reaching adulthood, and begin to maintain vast territories. Territorial conflicts when territories overlap are common. Such conflicts between same sex individuals are far more common, but male-female conflicts occur as well. Females are larger and more aggressive than males; as a result, territorial disputes between females are somewhat more common than in males. Nevertheless, females hold far smaller territories than males. The average territory size of females is 868 m² amongst inland and 382 m² amongst coastal populations. Males hold territories averaging 1,250 m² amongst inland and 1,718 m² amongst coastal populations. During such conflicts, individuals often severely injure each other. After mating, the individual holding the territory will forcefully evict the other.

Juveniles meanwhile are not seen as a territorial threat by adults and are in this respect ignored. Juveniles do not hold territories and have a shifting home range, and as such will even sleep with other juveniles when given the opportunity.

While territories cannot be held in captivity, they are known to defend resting and nesting areas of about 35cm in diameter in captive settings. However, the defence of immediate nesting sites occurs only in captivity.

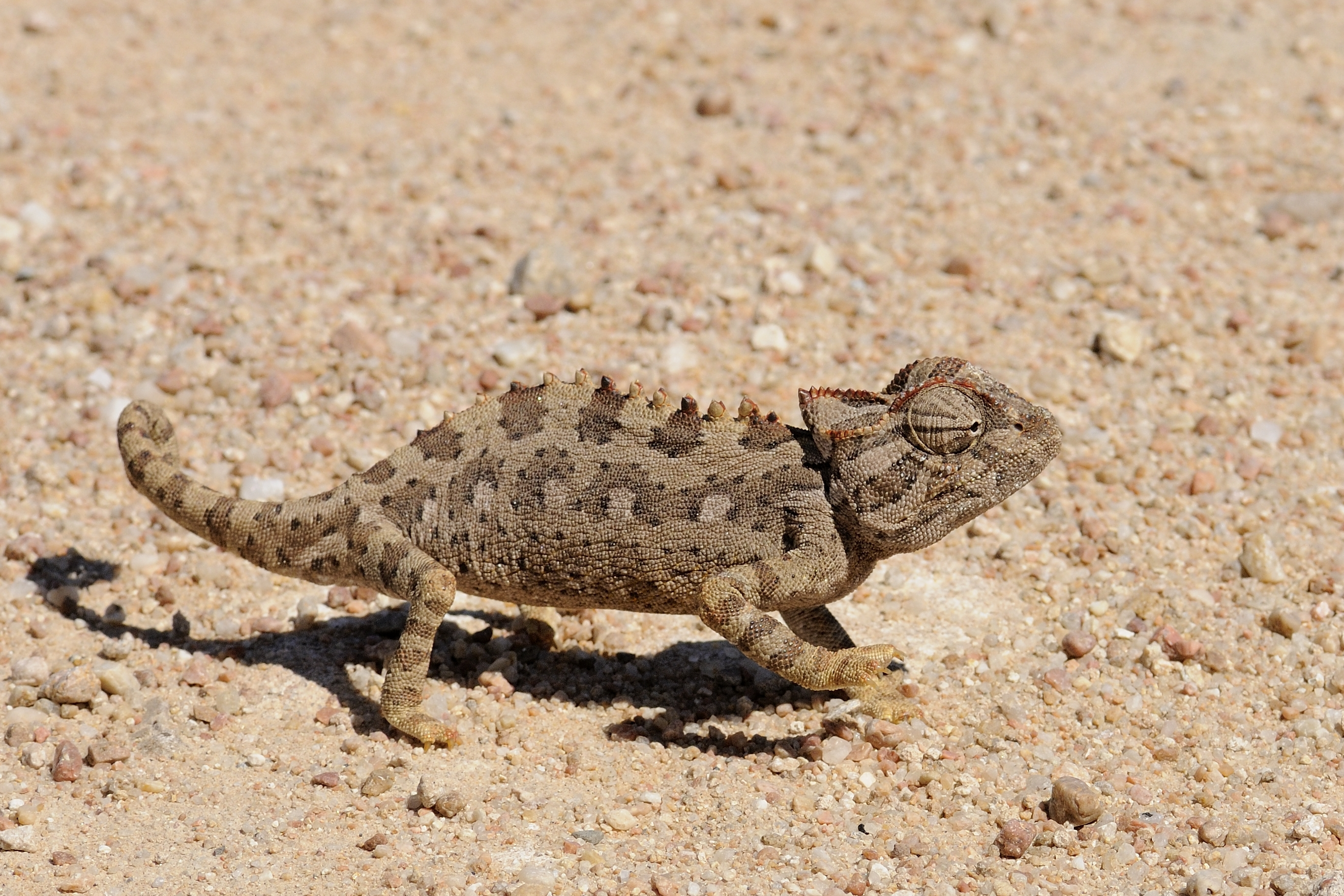
Namaqua chameleon in the Namib Desert

==== Reproduction ====
Breeding can occur at any point in the year, after which eggs spend a gestation period of 35-45 days inside the mother. Adult females lay around 2-3 clutches of eggs a year, although occasionally may lay up to 4. Each clutch consists of 10-13 eggs, but may be as large as 22 eggs or as little as 6. Eggs are buried under loose gravel and in a layer of moist sand, as dried sand shrivels up the eggs. Sometimes an extension of their resting burrow may be excavated for egg laying. Such behaviour may indicate a level of parental care of eggs due to the close proximity of the eggs to the parent throughout incubation. In the wild, a 20-25 cm deep burrow is excavated, and the eggs are laid in the burrow at a depth of 15 cm to reach the damp layer of sand. In captive settings, eggs may be buried about 10cm under the substrate. Groups of 6-8 eggs are laid in layers, with one layer being buried before laying another directly above. Excavation and laying last 8-10 hours. Unusually in captive settings, other chameleons of either sex may assist in covering the hole after laying. Eggs have a gestation period of 35-45 days inside the mother, and take about 100 days to hatch after being laid. Compared to adults, young prefer and are more skilled at climbing. Females become sexually mature by 150 days, and males by 210 days. Like many chameleons and other lizards, females can store sperm after mating once so that more fertile eggs may be laid months later.

Laying is taxing on females and depletes their fat reserves. Females subsequently eat as much as the stomach capacity allows. In captive settings, females should be allowed to eat as much as they want after laying.

Due to the especially advanced state of embryos and eggs by the time they are laid, it has been suggested that this species is in the process of evolving ovoviviparity.

===== Courtship =====
During courtship, adults adopt a mottled and spotted colouration. Like some iguanids, only recently ovulated females are receptive to mating. Non-receptive females will attack males attempting to mate, and the size disparity often causes serious injury or even death of the male.

=== Burrowing ===
Unlike more arboreal chameleon species, Namaqua chameleons often utilize burrows as retreats. Sometimes they will take advantage of abandoned rodent burrows, but will often excavate their own as well.

== Conservation ==
Namaqua chameleons are listed as CITES II. In 2012, the filming of the Mad Max sequel Fury Road caused damage to Namaqua chameleon habitat in Dorob National Park and Namib-Naukluft National Park.
