= Ottoman invasion of Mani =

Ottoman invasion of Mani may refer to:

- Ottoman invasion of Mani (1770)
- Ottoman invasion of Mani (1803)
- Ottoman invasion of Mani (1807)
- Ottoman invasion of Mani (1815)
