= Military history of Greece =

The military history of Greece is the history of the wars and battles that took place in Greece, the Balkans, and the Greek colonies in the Mediterranean Sea and the Black Sea, respectively, since classical antiquity.

== List of military encounters ==
=== Medieval period ===
- Iberian War (526-532)
  - Battle of Dara (530)
- Vandalic War (533-534)
  - Battle of Ad Decimum (533)
  - Battle of Tricamarum (533)
- Gothic War (535-554)
  - Battle of Taginae (552)
  - Battle of Mons Lactarius (553)
- Arab–Byzantine wars (629–1050)
  - Battle of Akroinon
  - Siege of Constantinople (674–678)
  - Siege of Constantinople (717–718)
  - Battle of Lalakaon
- Roman–Persian Wars (92 BC-627)
  - Battle of Nineveh (627)
- Byzantine–Bulgarian wars (680-1355)
  - Battle of Anchialus (763)
  - Battle of Kleidion (1014)
- Siege of Constantinople (1204)
- Battle of Pelagonia
- Byzantine–Seljuq wars (1048–1308)
  - Battle of Philomelion (1116)
  - Siege of Nicaea
  - Battle of Hyelion and Leimocheir
  - Siege of Trebizond (1205–06)
  - Battle of Antioch on the Meander
- Byzantine–Ottoman Wars (1265–1453)
  - Siege of Constantinople (1422)
  - Fall of Constantinople (1453)

=== Ottoman Greece ===
- Battle of Lepanto (1571)
- Epirus peasant revolts (1600), (1611)
- Morean War (1684–1699)
- Orlov Revolt (1770)
- Ottoman invasion of Mani (1770)
- Siege of Kastania (1770)
- Battle of Chesma (1770)
- Battle of Vromopigada (1770)
- Sfakia revolt (1770)
- Ottoman invasion of Mani (1803)
- Souliotes
- Souliote War (1803)
- Ottoman invasion of Mani (1807)
- Ottoman invasion of Mani (1815)

=== 19th century ===
- Greek War of Independence (1821–1829)
  - Siege of Tripolitsa
  - Battle of Gravia Inn
  - Battle of Dervenakia
  - First siege of Missolonghi
  - Second siege of Missolonghi
  - Battle of Vasilika
  - Ottoman–Egyptian invasion of Mani
- Epirus Revolt of 1854
- Cretan Revolt (1866–69)
- Epirus Revolt of 1878
  - Battle of Mouzaki
- Greco-Turkish War (1897)

=== 20th century ===
- First Balkan War (1912–1913)
  - Battle of Sarantaporo
  - Battle of Yenidje
  - Battle of Pente Pigadia
  - Himara revolt of 1912
  - Battle of Elli
  - Capture of Korytsa
  - Battle of Lemnos (1913)
  - Battle of Bizani
- Second Balkan War (1913)
- World War I (1917–1918)
  - Balkans Campaign
  - Macedonian Front
- Southern Russia intervention
- Greco-Turkish War (1919-1922)
  - Battle of Afyonkarahisar-Eskişehir
- World War II
  - Greco-Italian War (1940–1941)
  - Battle of Greece (1941)
  - Battle of Crete (1941)
  - First Battle of El Alamein (1942)
  - Second Battle of El Alamein (1942)
  - Invasion of Normandy (1944)
- Greek Civil War (1945–1949)
- Korean War (1950–1953)
- Turkish invasion of Cyprus
- Kosovo Force

=== 21st century ===
- Afghanistan (2001–2021)
- 2011 Libyan civil war

== List of fortifications in Greece ==
=== Medieval period ===
==== Byzantine ====
- Monemvasia
- Mistra
- Castle of Zarnata

==== Frankish and Crusader ====
- Passavas
- Beaufort
- Tigani
- Grand Magne, among several castles referred to as Kastro tis Orias
- Kelefa

==== Venetian ====
- Kastro Larissa at Argos
- Palamidi at Nafplio

=== Modern ===
==== American ====
- NSA Souda Bay

==== Greek ====
- Metaxas Line

== List of Greek military institutions ==
- Hellenic Military Academy
- Hellenic Naval Academy
- Hellenic Air Force Academy

== List of military alliances ==
=== Byzantine ===
- Goths
- Varangians
- Bulgarians
- Armenians
- Italian city-states
- Rus' people
- Alans
- Republic of Venice

=== Modern ===
- Russian Empire
- United Kingdom
- France
- Balkan League
- Allies of World War I
- Allies of World War II
- United States
- NATO
- United Nations
- Cyprus
- European Union

== See also ==
- Military of Greece
- History of the Hellenic Army
- History of the Hellenic Navy
- History of the Hellenic Air Force
- List of wars involving Greece
