= Greece–Ottoman Empire relations =

Greece and the Ottoman Empire established diplomatic relations in the 1830s. This was following Greece's formation after its declaration of independence from the Ottoman Empire. Their relations can be characterised as having a history of conflict. There were several wars that they directly and indirectly fought each other and that led to a gradual loss of territory by the Ottoman Empire until its final defeat during World War I.

== Background ==
=== Greek and Turk relations: 6th–14th centuries ===
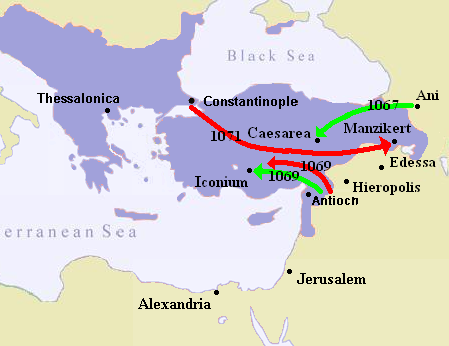
Byzantine territory (purple), Byzantine campaigns (red) and Seljuk campaigns (green)

The Byzantine Empire although a different regime to the nation of Greece, factors into the nations modern relations as heritage. Some view the Byzantine Empire (the Greek-speaking Eastern Roman Empire during the medieval era) as the medieval expression of a Greek nation and a pre-modern nation state.

The Göktürks of the First Turkic Khaganate were the first Turkic state to use the name Türk politically. The first contact with the Romans (Byzantine Empire) is believed to be 563. The 10th century saw the rise of the Seljuk Turks.

The first conflict between the Byzantine Empire and Seljuk Turks occurred at the Battle of Kapetron in 1048. More notable is the Battle of Manzikert in 1071 and the Turkish settlement of Anatolia that followed. Later, Turkish Anatolian beyliks were established both in formerly Byzantine lands and in the territory of the fragmenting Seljuk Sultanate. One of those beyliks was the Ottoman dynasty and become the Ottoman Empire. In 1453, the Ottoman Empire conquered Constantinople, the capital city of the Byzantine Empire.

=== The Rum Millet: 15th–19th centuries ===
All of modern Greece by the time of the capture of the Despotate of the Morea was under Ottoman authority, with the exception of some of the islands.

- Islands such as Rhodes (1522), Cyprus (1571), and Crete (1669) resisted longer due to other empires that came into power from the Frankokratia days
- The Ionian Islands were never ruled by the Ottomans and remained under the rule of the Republic of Venice until their capture by the French First Republic in 1797, then passed to the United Kingdom in 1809 until their unification with Greece in 1864.
- The mountains of Greece were largely untouched, and were a refuge for Greeks who desired to flee Ottoman rule and engage in guerrilla warfare.
- In 1770, the Ottoman army invaded the Mani, one of a series of battles by the Ottomans to subdue the Maniots. The Ottoman's would attempt again in 1803, 1807 and 1815.

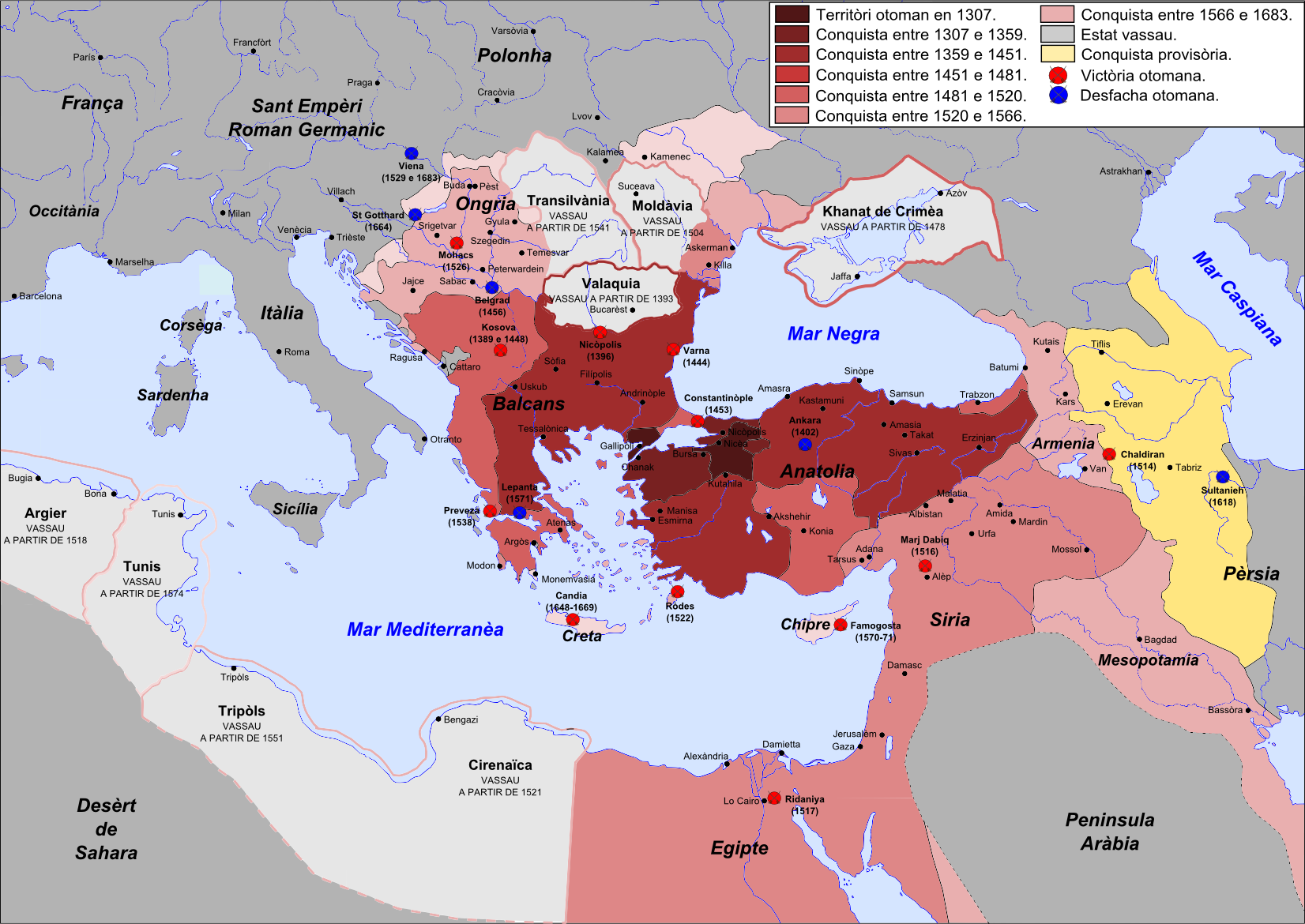
A map of the territorial expansion of the Ottoman Empire from 1307 to 1683.

Life under the Ottoman Empire had several dimensions:

- All conquered Orthodox Christians would be included in the Rum Millet (millet-i Rûm) or the "Roman nation", and enjoyed a certain autonomy. It was named after Roman ("Romioi" in Greek and "Byzantine" by modern historians) subjects of the Ottoman Empire. Christian Orthodox Greeks, Bulgarians, Albanians, Georgians, Arabs, Aromanians, Megleno-Romanians, and Serbs were all considered part of the same millet and the religious hierarchy was dominated by Greeks (but there is evidence that they had different names with Rum representing Greeks only).
- Devshirme was a child levy (in Greek: paidomazoma) which was emotionally traumatic for families. Boys were recruited and forcefully converted to Islam to serve the state but it was also done as a means to dismantle clan ties and dissolve traditions. Historian Constantine Paparrigopoulos estimated 1 million boys were recruited as Janissaries; a figure closer to 1 in 40 is more likely. The system would eventually be dismantled in 1638/1648m and formally abolished in the early part of Ahmet III's reign (1703–1730).
- Dhimmi were subject to the heavy jizya tax, which was about 20%, versus the Muslim zakat, which was about 3%. Other major taxes were the Defter and İspençe and the more severe haraç, whereby a document was issued which stated that "the holder of this certificate is able to keep his head on the shoulders since he paid the Χαράτσι tax for this year..." All these taxes were waived if the person converted to Islam.

Romioi in various places of the Greek peninsula would at times rise up against Ottoman rule, taking advantage of wars the Ottoman Empire would engage in. Those uprisings were of mixed scale and impact.

- During the Ottoman–Venetian War (1463–1479), the Maniot Kladas brothers, Krokodelos and Epifani, were leading bands of stratioti on behalf of Venice against the Turks in Southern Peloponnese. They put Vardounia and their lands into Venetian possession, for which Epifani then acted as governor.
- Before and after the victory of the Holy League in 1571 at the Battle of Lepanto a series of conflicts broke out in the peninsula such as in Epirus, Phocis (recorded in the Chronicle of Galaxeidi) and the Peloponnese, led by the Melissinos brothers and others. They were crushed by the following year. Short-term revolts on the local level occurred throughout the region such as the ones led by metropolitan bishop Dionysius the Philosopher in Thessaly (1600) and Epirus (1611).
- During the Cretan War (1645–1669), the Maniots would aid Francesco Morosini and the Venetians in the Peloponnese. Greek irregulars also aided the Venetians through the Morean War in their operations on the Ionian Sea and Peloponnese.
- A major uprising during that period was the Orlov Revolt (Greek: Ορλωφικά) which took place during the Russo-Turkish War (1768–1774) and triggered armed unrest in both the Greek mainland and the islands.
- In 1778, a Greek fleet of seventy vessels assembled by Lambros Katsonis which harassed the Turkish squadrons in the Aegean Sea, captured the island of Kastelorizo and engaged the Turkish fleet in naval battles until 1790.
- In 1803 there was a final fight between the Souliotes and the local Ottoman ruler, Ali Pasha, which ended the many years of conflicts between them.

Greek nationalism started to appear in the 18th century.

- Following the Orlov Revolt and the Russo-Turkish War (1768–1774), the Treaty of Küçük Kaynarca gave Russian involvement to intervene on the side of Ottoman Eastern Orthodox subjects.
- Greek ethnic identity had fused with the Rum millet identity. However, the 18th century enlightenment would inspire a new secular "Hellenic" identity of the Rum millet. There was a reconceptualisation of the Rum Millet from being Greek Orthodox religion adherents to all Greek speakers The French Revolution further intensified the growing battle between conservative and liberal Greek Orthodox elites and in the 1790–1800 decade a heated conflict broke out
- Despite Greek-speaking and non-Greek speaking Orthodox Christians at the time identifying as Romioi, one of the enlightenment intellectuals Adamantios Korais pushed the word Graikoi as a replacement as it helped disassociate it from the Roman heritage and the Church (as well as being an older word than Hellenes).
- Revolutionary instigator Rigas Velestinlis and the Filiki Eteria behind the 1821 uprising intended to have a Balkan Orthodox uprising and a coalition between all the different ethnic communities. The focus of revolution ideology was the division between the Muslim Ottoman privileged class Askeri with the second class citizens Rayah which was predominately Greek Orthodox.
- Ottoman authorities believed Russia's imperial agenda and the general weakness of the state rather than conscientious political action is why the Greek revolution started.

In March 1821, the Greek War of Independence from the Ottoman Empire began. In Constantinople, on Easter Sunday, the Patriarch of the Greek Orthodox Church, Gregory V, was publicly hanged although he had condemned the revolution and preached obedience to the Sultan in his sermons.

== History ==
=== Formation of Greece: 1822–1832 ===
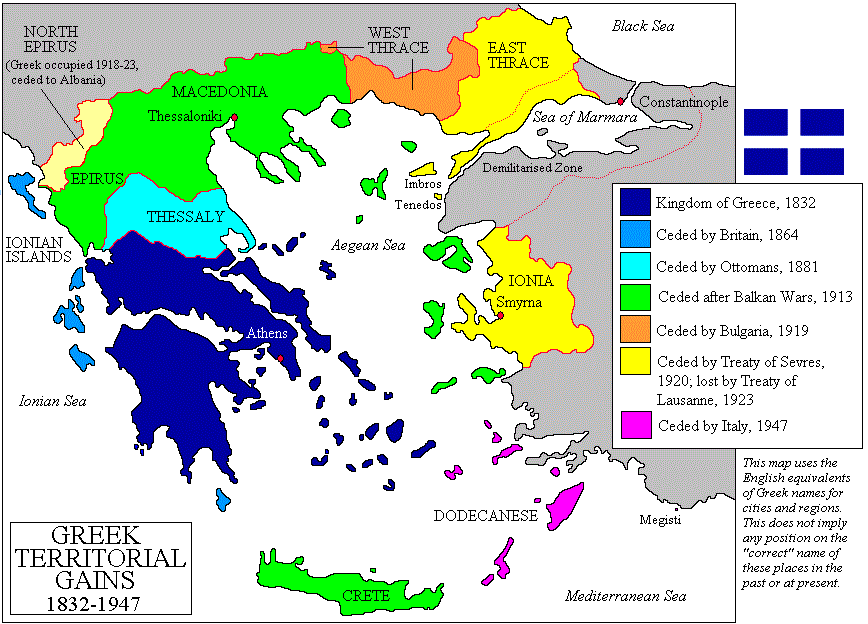
Territorial Expansion of Greece from 1832 to 1947

Building on the success of the first year of war, the Greek Constitution of 1822 would be the first of the new state, adopted at the first National Assembly at Epidaurus.

However, the Greek victories would be short-lived as civil war would weaken its ability to react; the Sultan called for aid from his Egyptian vassal Muhammad Ali, who dispatched his son Ibrahim Pasha to Greece with a fleet and 8,000 men, and later added 25,000 troops. Ibrahim's intervention proved decisive: much of the Peloponnese was reconquered in 1825; the gateway town of Messolonghi fell in 1826; and Athens was taken in 1827. The only territory still held by Greek nationalists was in Nafplion, Mani, Hydra, Spetses and Aegina. During this time, there were many massacres during the Greek War of Independence committed by both revolutionaries and the Ottoman Empire's forces.

The Treaty of London (1827) was declined by the Ottoman Empire, which led to the Battle of Navarino in 1827. The French Morea expedition between 1828 and 1833 would expel Egyptian troops from the Peloponnese and the Russo-Turkish War (1828–1829) which occurred in retaliation due to Russian support at Navarino, led to the Treaty of Adrianople (1829) which enforced the Treaty of London. Karl Marx in an article in the New York Tribune (21 April 1853), wrote: "Who solved finally the Greek case? It was neither the rebellion of Ali Pasha, neither the battle in Navarino, neither the French Army in Peloponnese, neither the conferences and protocols of London; but it was Diebitsch, who invaded through the Balkans to Evros".

The establishment of a Greek state was recognized in the London Protocol of 1828 but it was not until the London Protocol of 1830, which amended the decisions of the 1829 protocol, that Greece was established as an independent, sovereign state. The assassination of Ioannis Kapodistrias, Greece's first governor, would lead to the London Conference of 1832 and that formed the Kingdom of Greece with the Treaty of Constantinople (1832).

The first borders of the Greek state consisted of the Greek mainland south of a line from Arta to Volos plus Euboea and the Cyclades islands in the Aegean Sea. The rest of the Greek-speaking lands, including Crete, Cyprus and the rest of the Aegean islands, Epirus, Thessaly, Macedonia and Thrace, remained under Ottoman rule. Over one million Greeks also lived in what is now Turkey, mainly in the Aegean region of Asia Minor, especially around Smyrna, in the Pontus region on the Black Sea coast, in the Gallipoli Peninsula, in Cappadocia, in Istanbul, in Imbros and in Tenedos.

=== Kingdom of Greece and Ottoman Empire: 1832–1913 ===
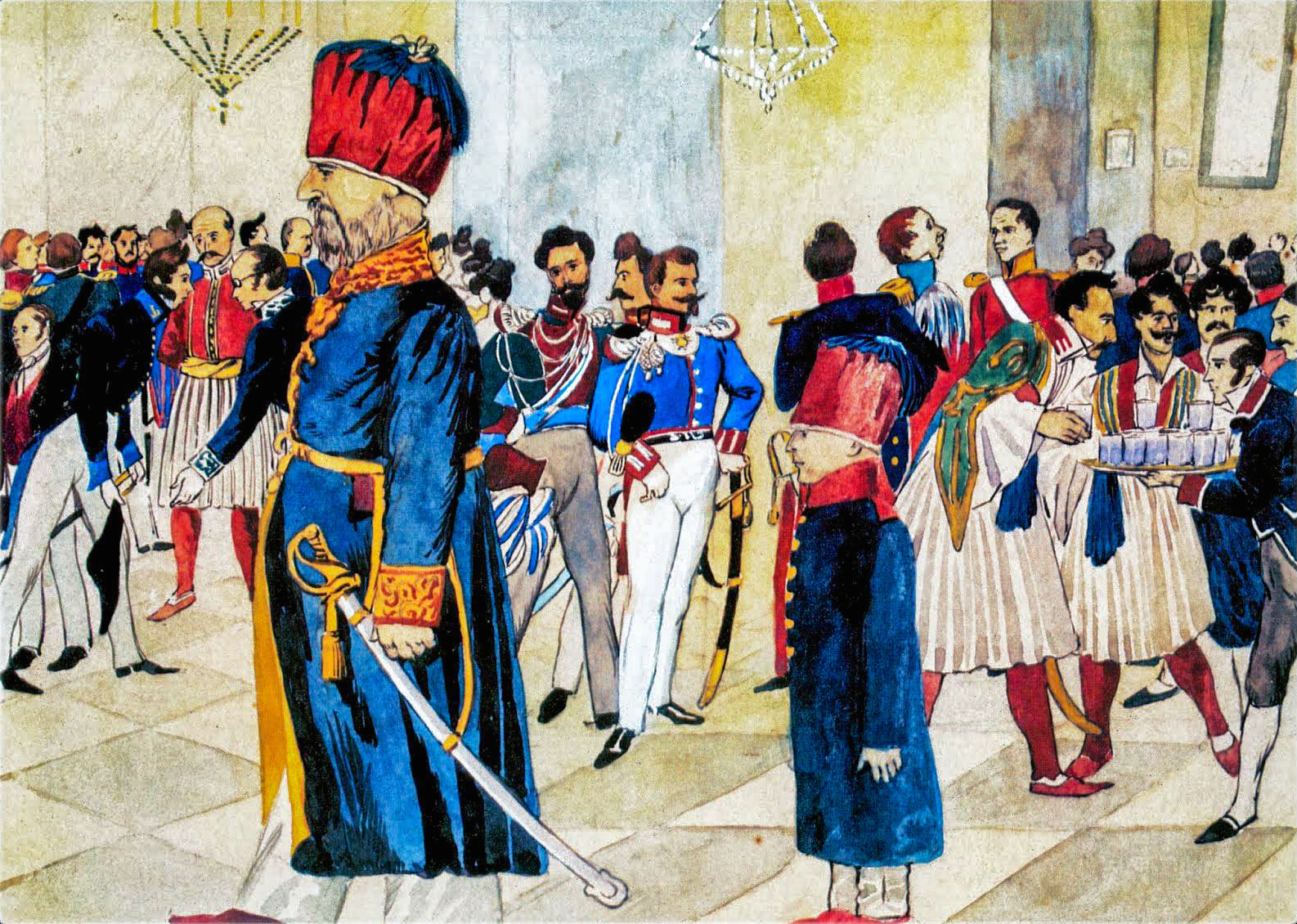
The first Ottoman ambassador to the Greek Kingdom, the Phanariote Konstantinos Mousouros, at a ball in the royal palace in Athens

The relations between Greece and the Ottoman Empire during this time period were shaped by two concepts:

- Termed in history as the Eastern Question with regards to the "sick man of Europe", it encompassed myriad interrelated elements: Ottoman military defeats, Ottoman institutional insolvency, the ongoing Ottoman political and economic modernization programme, the rise of ethno-religious nationalism in its provinces, and Great Power rivalries.
- In Greek politics, the Megali Idea. It was an irredentist concept that expressed the goal of reviving the Byzantine Empire, by establishing a Greek state, which would include the large Greek populations that were still under Ottoman rule after the end of the Greek War of Independence (1821–1828) and all the regions that had large Greek populations (parts of the Southern Balkans, Asia Minor and Cyprus). The term was first introduced by Greek Prime Minister Ioannis Kolettis in 1844 in the inaugural speech of the first Greek constitution in front of Greece's parliament for a common destiny of all Greeks. During the Crimean war the following decade, it became a platform for territorial expansion. It came to dominate foreign relations and played a significant role in domestic politics for much of the first century of Greek independence.

There were five wars that directly and indirectly linked all conflict

- Crimean War (1854 to 1856). Britain and France prevented Greece from attacking the Ottomans by occupying Piraeus. The unsuccessful Epirus Revolt of 1854 tried to take advantage of this period.
- Russo-Turkish War (1877–1878): Greece was prevented from taking military action during this war in 1877, in which the Greeks were keen to join in with the objective of territorial expansion, but Greece was unable to take any effective part in the war. Nevertheless, after the Congress of Berlin, in 1881 Greece was given most of Thessaly and part of Epirus. The 1878 Greek Macedonian rebellion and Epirus Revolt of 1878 occurred during this period.
- Greco-Turkish War (1897): A new revolt in Crete led to the first direct war between Greece and the Ottoman Empire. An unprepared Greek army was unable to dislodge the Ottoman troops from their fortifications along the northern border, and with the resulting Ottoman counter-attack, the war resulted in minor territorial losses for Greece.
- The two Balkan Wars (1912–1913): Four Balkan states, forming the Balkan League, defeated the Ottoman Empire in the First Balkan War (1912–1913). In the Second Balkan War, Bulgaria fought against all four original combatants of the first war, and also faced an attack from Romania from the north. The Ottoman Empire lost the bulk of its territory in Europe. The First Balkan War had Greece seize Crete, the islands, the rest of Thessaly and Epirus, and coastal Macedonia from the Ottomans. Crete was once again the flashpoint for tension between the two nations. The Treaty of London ended the First Balkan war, but no one was left satisfied. The Treaty of Bucharest, concluded the Second Balkan War, which left Greece with southern Epirus, the southern-half of Macedonia, Crete and the Aegean islands, except for the Dodecanese, which had been occupied by Italy in 1911. Conflict would occur with the Epirus Revolt of 1854 (during the Crimean War) and the 1878 Greek Macedonian rebellion and Epirus Revolt of 1878 (during the Russo-Turkish War (1877–1878)). By the end of the Second Balkan War due to the Treaty of Bucharest (1913) Greece grew by two-thirds: it went from 64,790 to 108,610 km^{2} (25,020 to 41,930 sq mi) and its population from 2,660,000 to 4,363,000.

The Young Turks, who seized power in the Ottoman Empire in 1908, were Turkish nationalists whose objective was to create a strong, centrally governed state. The Christian minorities of the Empire, including Greeks, saw their position in the Empire deteriorate.

=== End of the Ottoman Empire and formation of Turkey: 1914–1923 ===
Greece entered the First World War on the side of the Allies in the summer of 1917 following The Great Division between the King and Prime Minister Eleftherios Venizelos. The Ottoman Empire entered the War with the attack on Russia's Black Sea coast on 29 October 1914. The attack prompted Russia and its allies, Britain and France, to declare war on the Ottoman Empire in November 1914. The Armistice of Mudros was signed on 31 October 1918, ending the Ottoman participation in World War I.

With the Allies victory in World War I, Greece was rewarded with territorial acquisitions, specifically Western Thrace (Treaty of Neuilly-sur-Seine) and Eastern Thrace and the Smyrna area (Treaty of Sèvres). Greek gains were largely undone by the subsequent Greco-Turkish War (1919–1922).

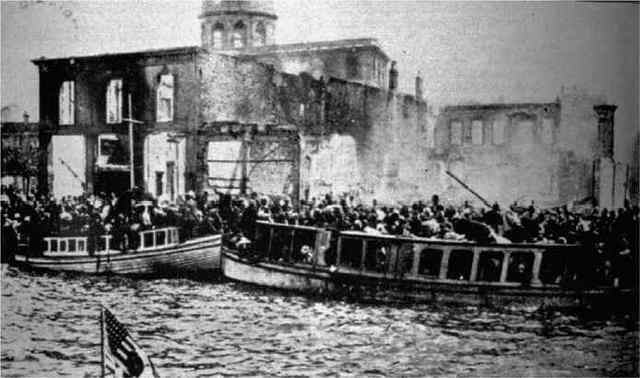
Overcrowded boats with refugees fleeing the Great fire of Smyrna. The photo was taken from the launch boat of a US warship.

- Greece occupied Smyrna on 15 May 1919, while Mustafa Kemal Pasha (later Atatürk), who was to become the leader of the Turkish opposition to the Treaty of Sèvres, landed in Samsun on May 19, 1919, an action that is regarded as the beginning of the Turkish War of Independence. He united the protesting voices in Anatolia and set in motion a nationalist movement to repel the Allied armies that had occupied Turkey and establish new borders for a sovereign Turkish nation. The Turkish nation would be Western in civilization and elevated its Turkish culture (which had faded under Arab culture), which included disassociating Islam from Arab culture and restricted into the private sphere. Having created a separate government in Ankara, Kemal's government did not recognise the Treaty of Sèvres and fought to have it revoked.
- The Turkish army entered Smyrna/İzmir on 9 September 1922, effectively ending the Greco-Turkish War (1919–1922) in the field. The Greek army and administration had already left by sea. The war was put to an end by the Armistice of Mudanya.
- According to some historians, it was the Greek occupation of Smyrna that created the Turkish National movement. Arnold J. Toynbee argues: "The war between Turkey and Greece which burst out at this time was a defensive war for safeguarding of the Turkish homelands in Anatolia. It was a result of the Allied policy of imperialism operating in a foreign state, the military resources and powers of which were seriously under-estimated; it was provoked by the unwarranted invasion of a Greek army of occupation." According to others, the landing of the Greek troops in Smyrna was part of Eleftherios Venizelos's plan, inspired by the Megali Idea, to liberate the large Greek populations in the Asia Minor. Prior to the Great Fire of Smyrna, Smyrna had a bigger Greek population than the Greek capital, Athens. Athens, before the Population exchange, had a population of 473,000, while Smyrna, according to Ottoman sources, in 1910, had a Greek population exceeding 629,000.

On 1 November 1922, the Turkish Parliament in Ankara formally abolished the Sultanate, thus ending 623 years of monarchical Ottoman rule. The Treaty of Lausanne of 24 July 1923, which superseded the Treaty of Sèvres, led to the international recognition of the sovereignty of the newly formed "Republic of Turkey" as the successor state of the Ottoman Empire, and the republic was officially proclaimed on 29 October 1923 in Ankara, the country's new capital. The Lausanne Convention stipulated a population exchange between Greece and Turkey, whereby 1.1 million Greeks left Turkey for Greece in exchange for 380,000 Muslims transferred from Greece to Turkey.

- The Treaty of Lausanne also provided for a Population exchange between Greece and Turkey that had begun before the final signature of the treaty in July 1923. About one and a half million Greeks had to leave Turkey for Greece and about half a million Turks had to leave Greece for Turkey (note that the population exchange was on religious grounds, thus the exchange was officially that of Christians for Muslims). The exceptions to the population exchange were Istanbul (Constantinople) and the islands of Gökçeada (Imbros) and Bozcaada (Tenedos), where the Greek minority (including the Ecumenical Patriarch) was allowed to stay, and Western Thrace, whose Muslim minority was also allowed to stay.
- The Treaty awarded the islands of Imbros and Tenedos to Turkey, with special provisions for the Greeks living there. These rights were revoked or violated by the 26 June 1927 legislation of "Civil Law"

There were atrocities and ethnic cleansing by both sides during this period. The war with Greece and the revolutionary Turks saw both sides commit atrocities. The Greek genocide was the systematic killing of the Christian Ottoman Greek population of Anatolia which started before the World War I, continued during the war and its aftermath (1914–1922). It was perpetrated by the government of the Ottoman Empire led by the Three Pashas and by the Government of the Grand National Assembly led by Mustafa Kemal Atatürk, against the indigenous Greek population of the Empire.
