= Athens War Museum =

Museum in Athens, Greece

- Πολεμικό Μουσείο Αθήνας

- Exterior of the Athens War Museum in 2018
- Established: July 18, 1975
- Location: Vassilissis Sofias Avenue, Athens, Greece
- Coordinates: 37°58′31″N 23°44′43″E
- Type: Military museum
- Public transit access: Evangelismos station, bus
- Website: warmuseum.gr

The Athens War Museum (Greek: Πολεμικό Μουσείο Αθήνας) is the military museum of the Greek Armed Forces. It is located at the Athens city center and it is served by the Athens Metro station of Evangelismos.

Established in 1975, the museum hosts collections that span the period from antiquity through the modern times.

== History ==
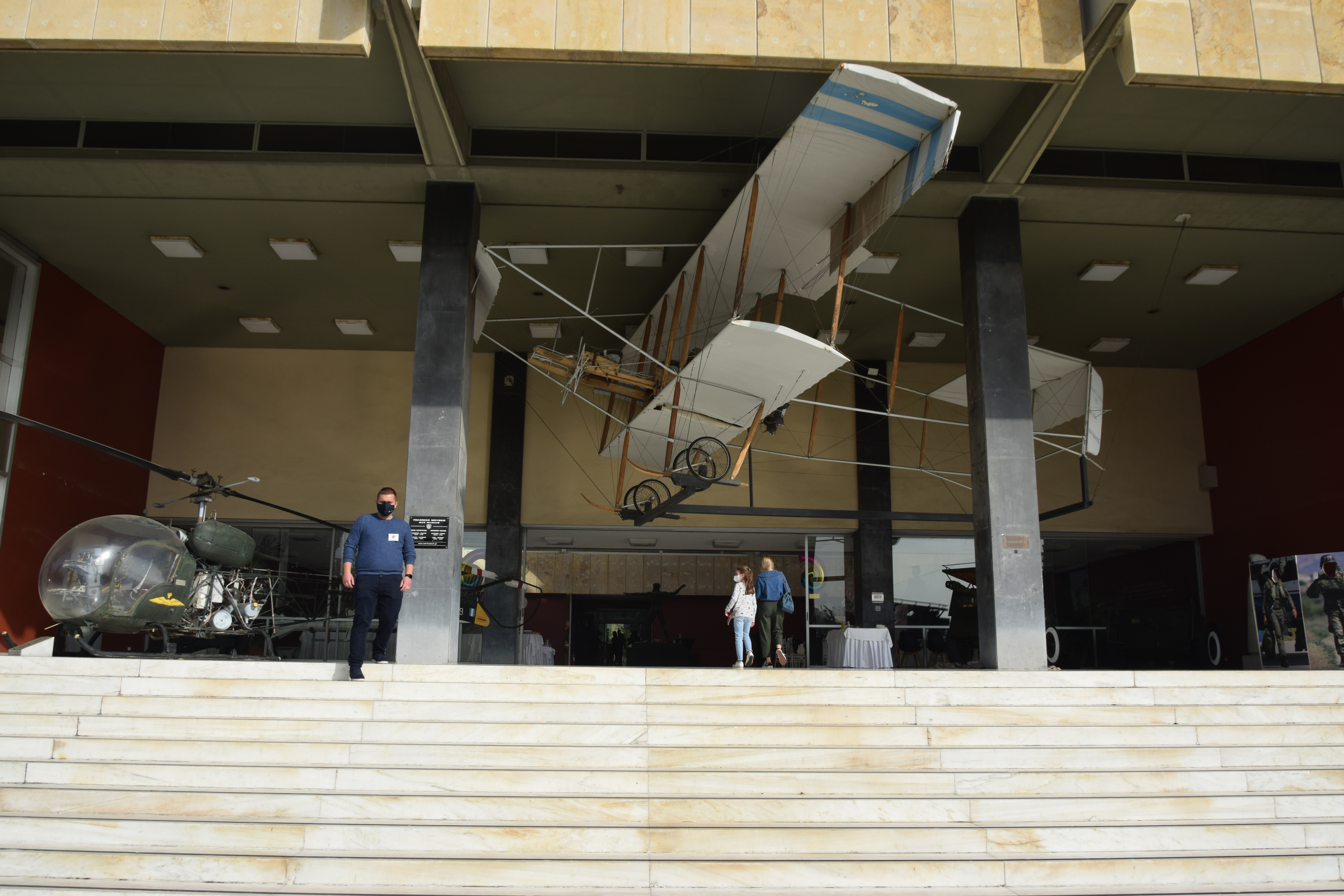
Entrance to the museum

In 1964 the Greek Government decided to create a war museum, which was finally founded in 1969. The design of the museum was undertaken by a team of distinguished architects, headed by Professor Thucydides Valentis of the National Technical University of Athens (N.T.U.A).

The building was erected in 1972 based on the modern trends of the time, with influences from the Bauhaus school. The museum was inaugurated on July 18, 1975, by the President of the Hellenic Republic Konstantinos Tsatsos and the Minister of Defense Evangelos Averoff.

The War Museum has established branches in Thessaloniki, Chania, Rethymno, Nauplion, Tripoli, Kalamata and Chalkida. The house museum of General Napoleon Zervas in Metaxourgeio neighborhood in Athens also serves as a branch of the War Museum.

== Purpose ==
The Athens War Museum is dedicated to the collection, preservation and exhibition of war artifacts, as well as the documentation and study of the military history of Greece from the early Bronze Age up to the present day. The museum also serves as an educational venue for school visits.

== Collections ==
Museum's exterior mainly houses several artillery guns from different eras, as well as decommissioned aircraft of the Greek Air Force.

The interior houses the permanent exhibit of weapons collection, donated to the Greek Army by Petros Saroglos (1864–1920), an officer and collector. The collection consists of weapons of various eras from all over the world, the most important being those of the Greek Revolution, along with artifacts from other civilizations. The War Museum also has a collection of maps and engravings mainly from Greece and its neighbouring regions. Furthermore, exhibits from the Antiquity, which testify to the presence of man from the Neolithic and early Bronze Age to classical antiquity. Visitors can see exhibits about Alexander the Great, Byzantine Empire, the Greek Revolution and the modern Greek history.

Exhibits are presented on almost all of Greece's military engagements of the 20th century: Macedonian Struggle, Balkan Wars, World War I, Asia Minor Campaign, World War II, Greek Expeditionary Corps in Korea. The museum also houses a collection of historic Hellenic Army uniforms, as well as exhibits related to EOKA struggle and the Turkish invasion of Cyprus in 1974.

Museum's various activities include the publication of books, the establishment and maintenance of monuments and memorials and the aid to services and agencies all over Greece. The Museum's exhibition areas are distributed over four levels (floors) and present images of Greek history from antiquity to the present. The museum's centerpieces are weaponry from conflicts where Greece was involved.

== Gallery ==
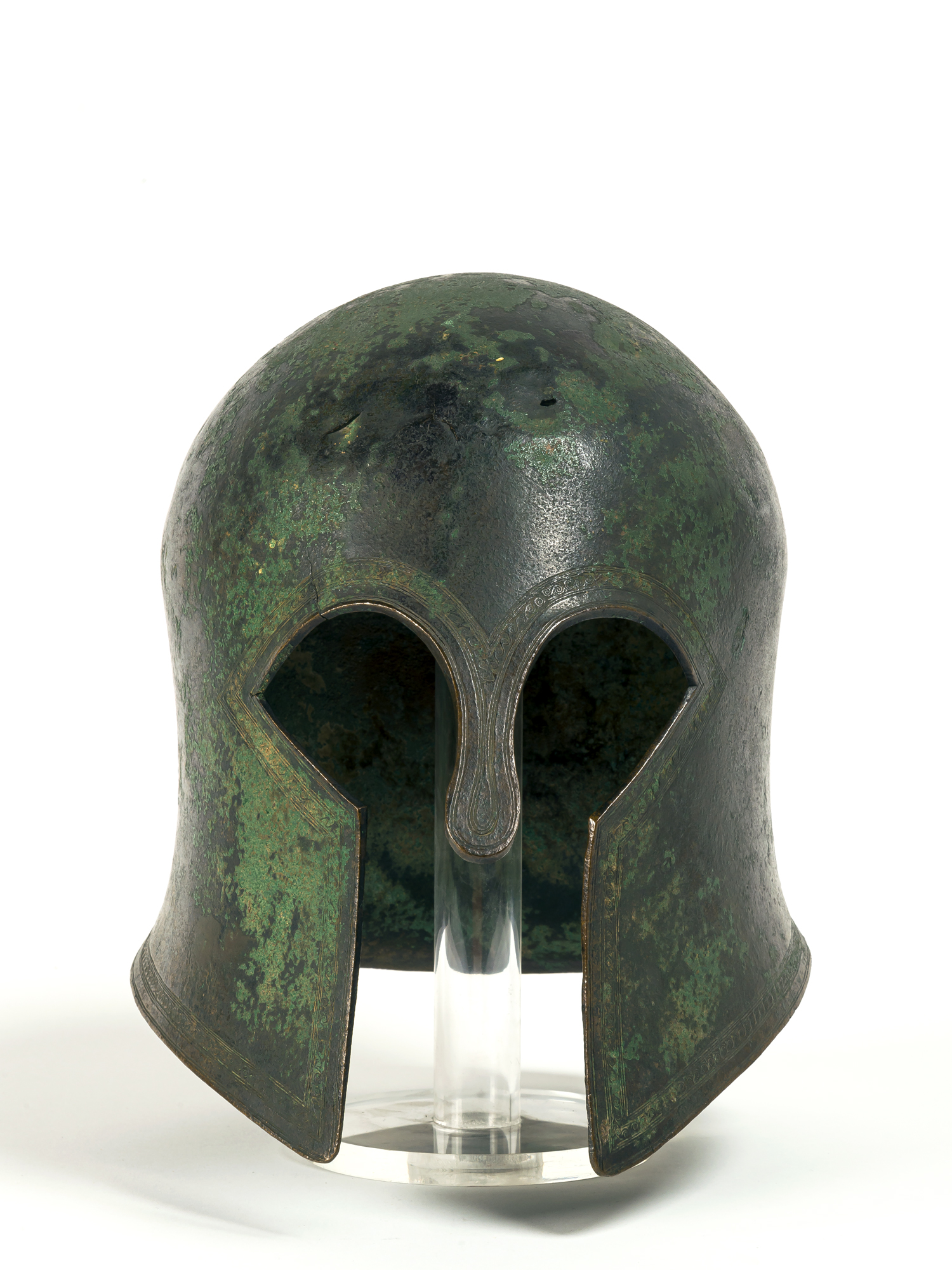
Ancient Greek helmet

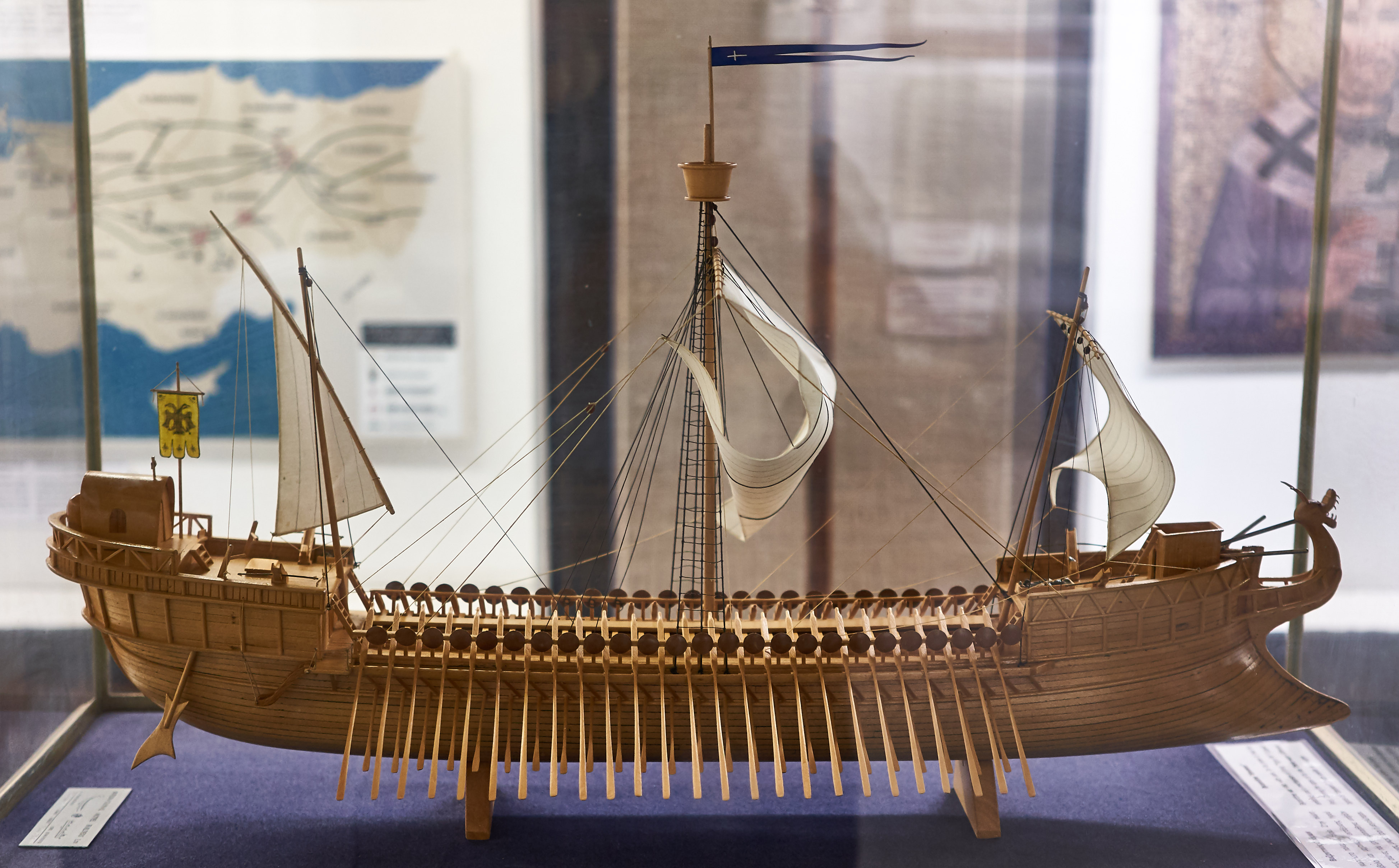
Model of a Byzantine warship (Dromon)

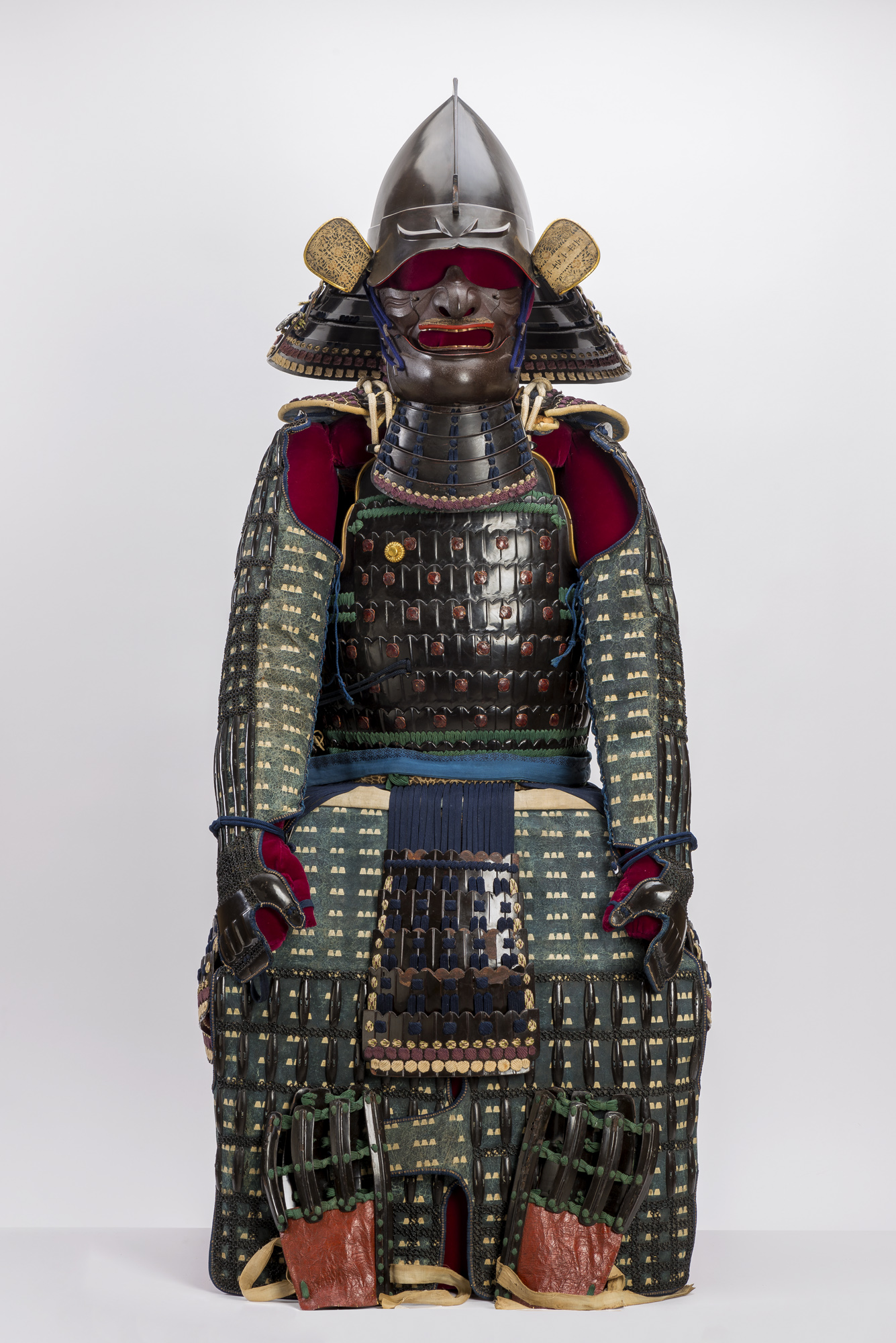
Samurai Japanese warrior armour, 14th century A.D.

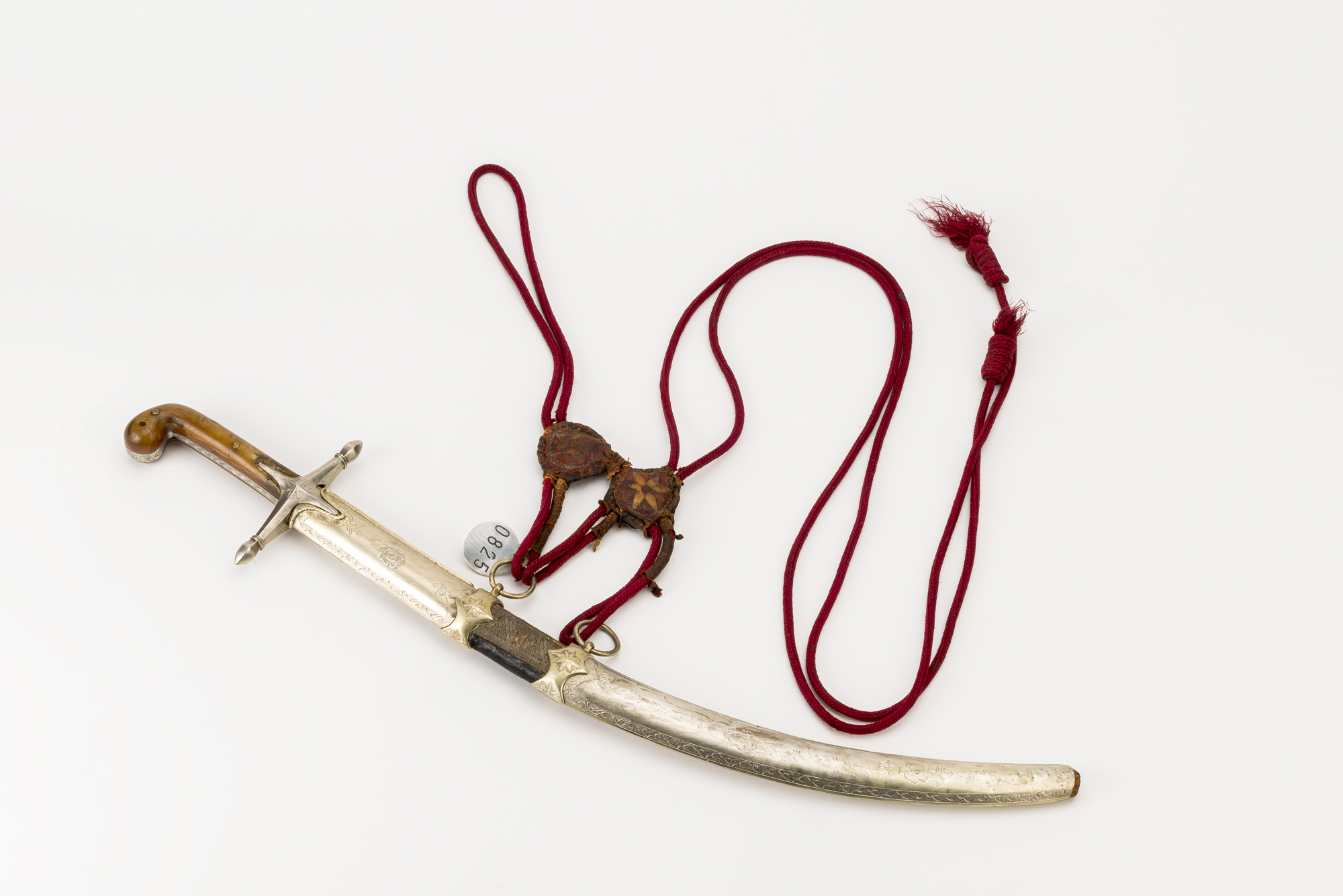
A child's sword from Ottoman Balkans

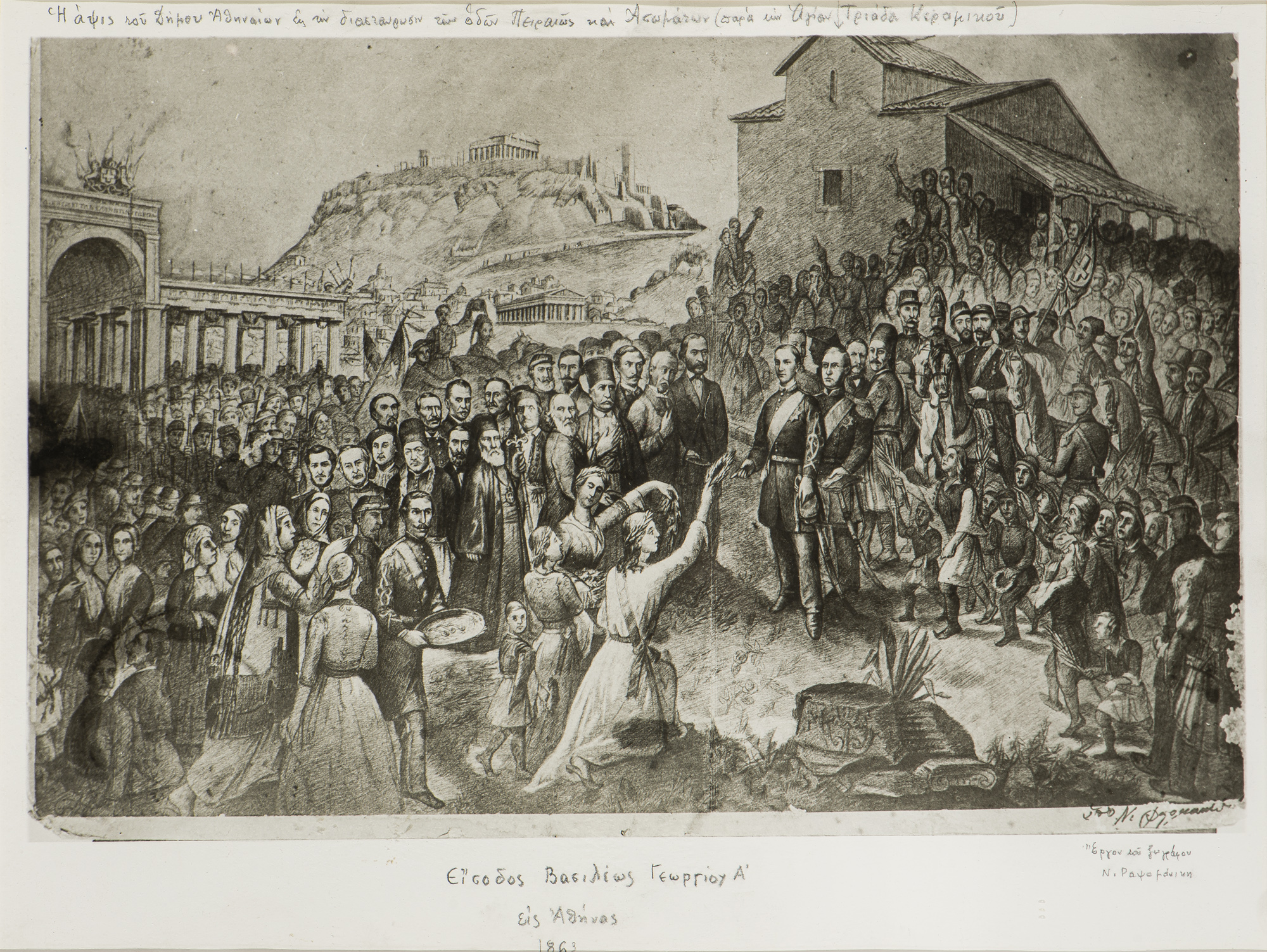
Engraving depicting the arrival of King George I at Athens

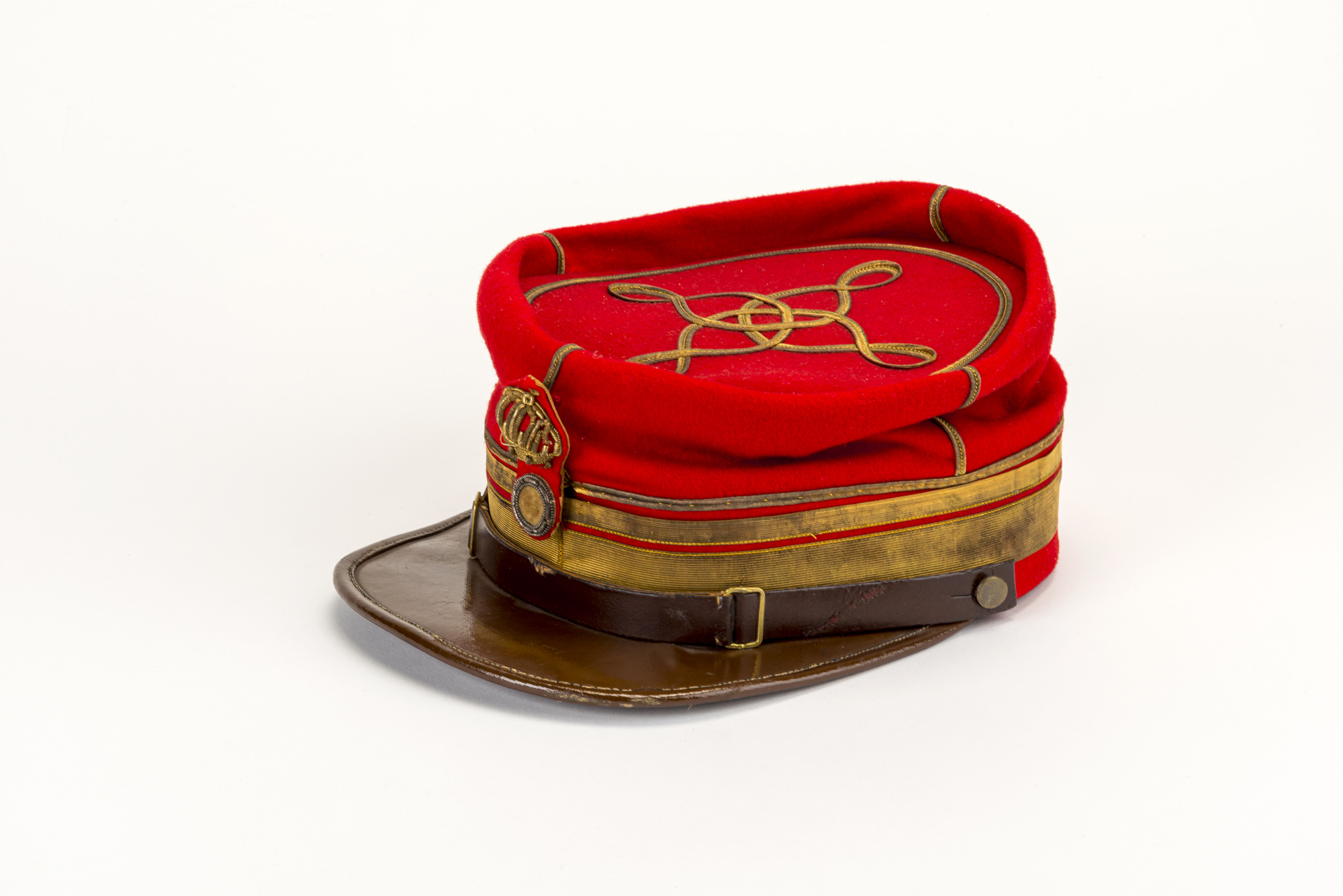
Garibaldini kepi

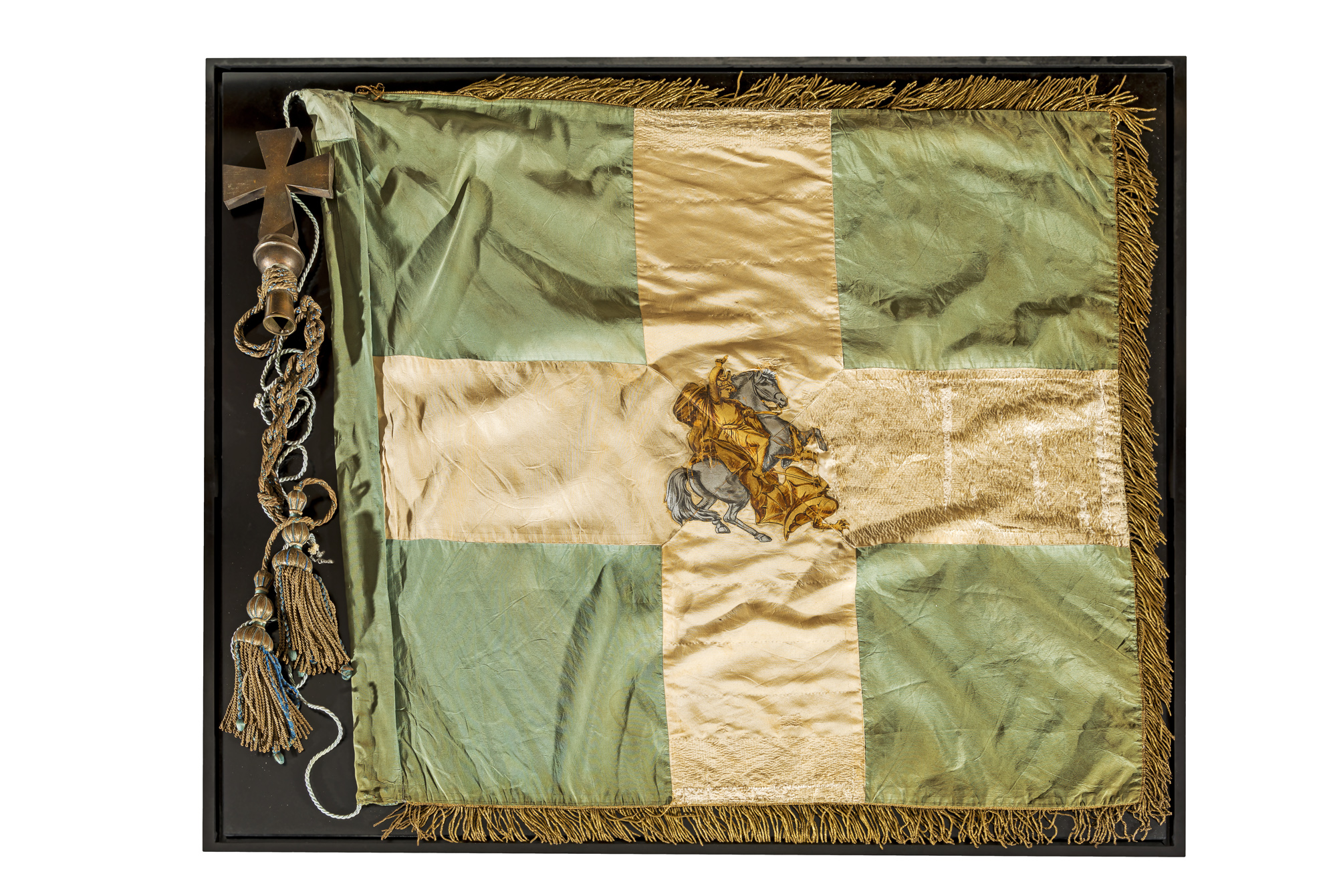
The Greek military flag used during the Victory Parade in Arc de Triomphe

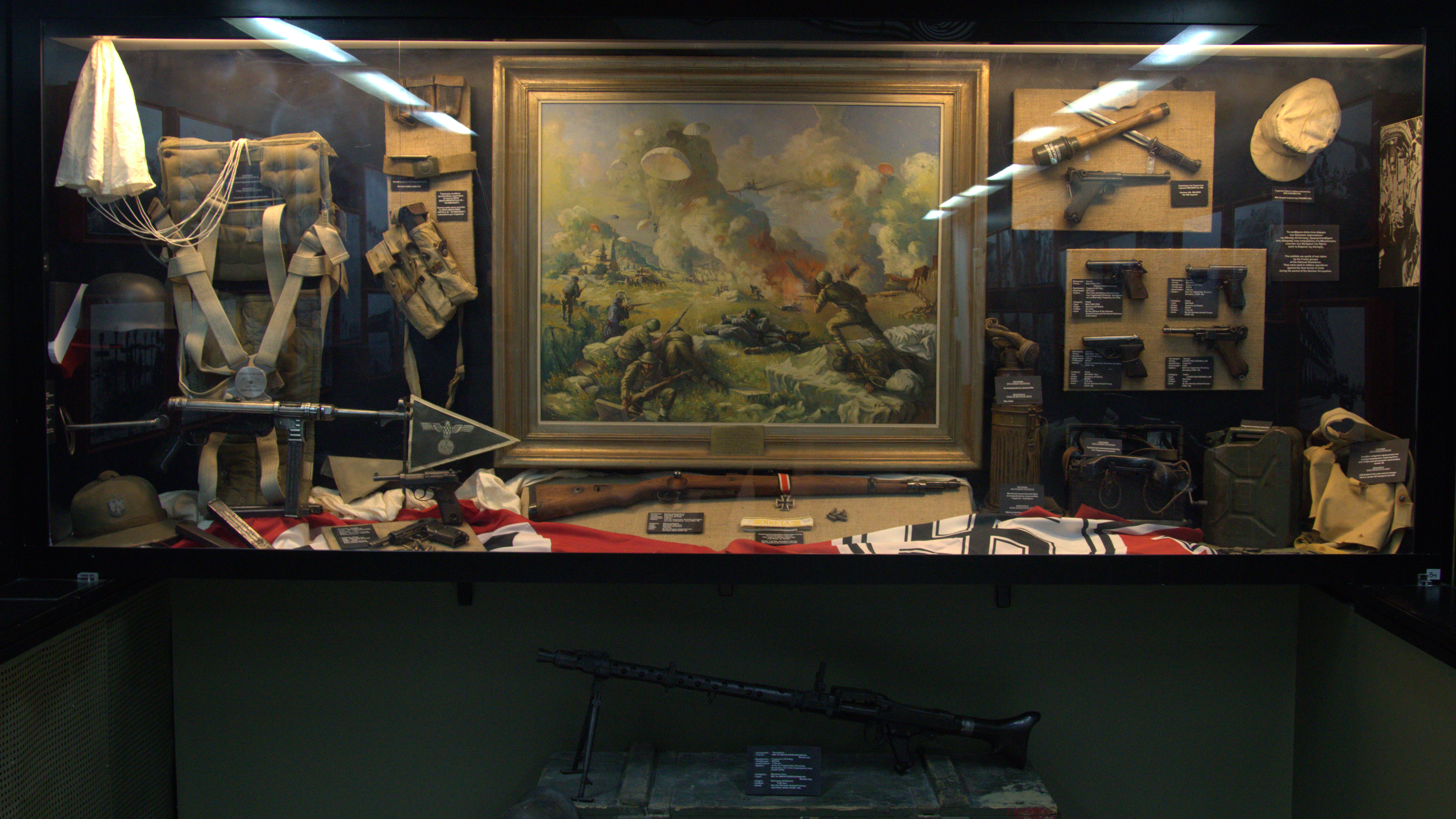
Exhibit showcasing the Battle of Crete

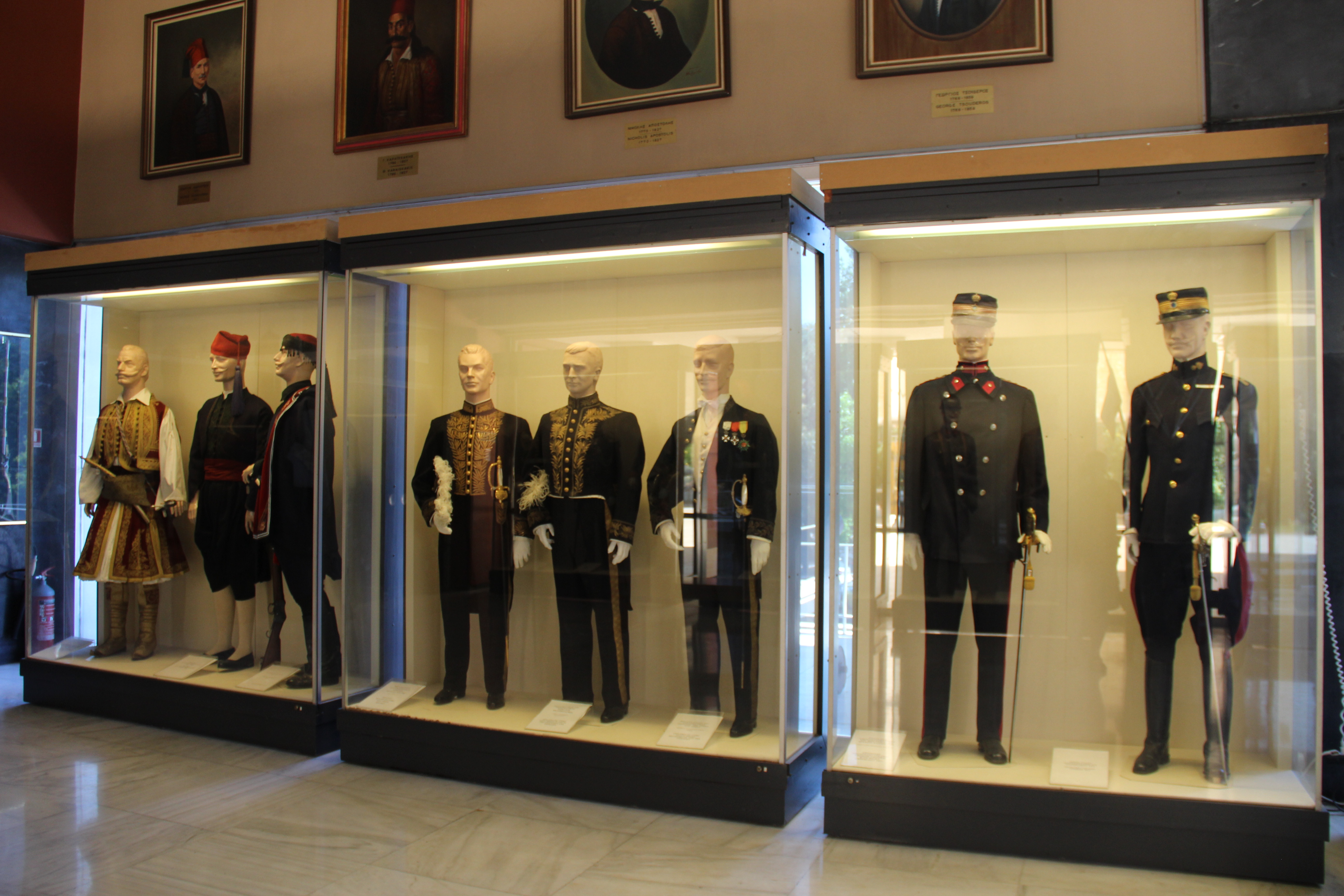
Greek military uniforms from the 19th to the 20th century

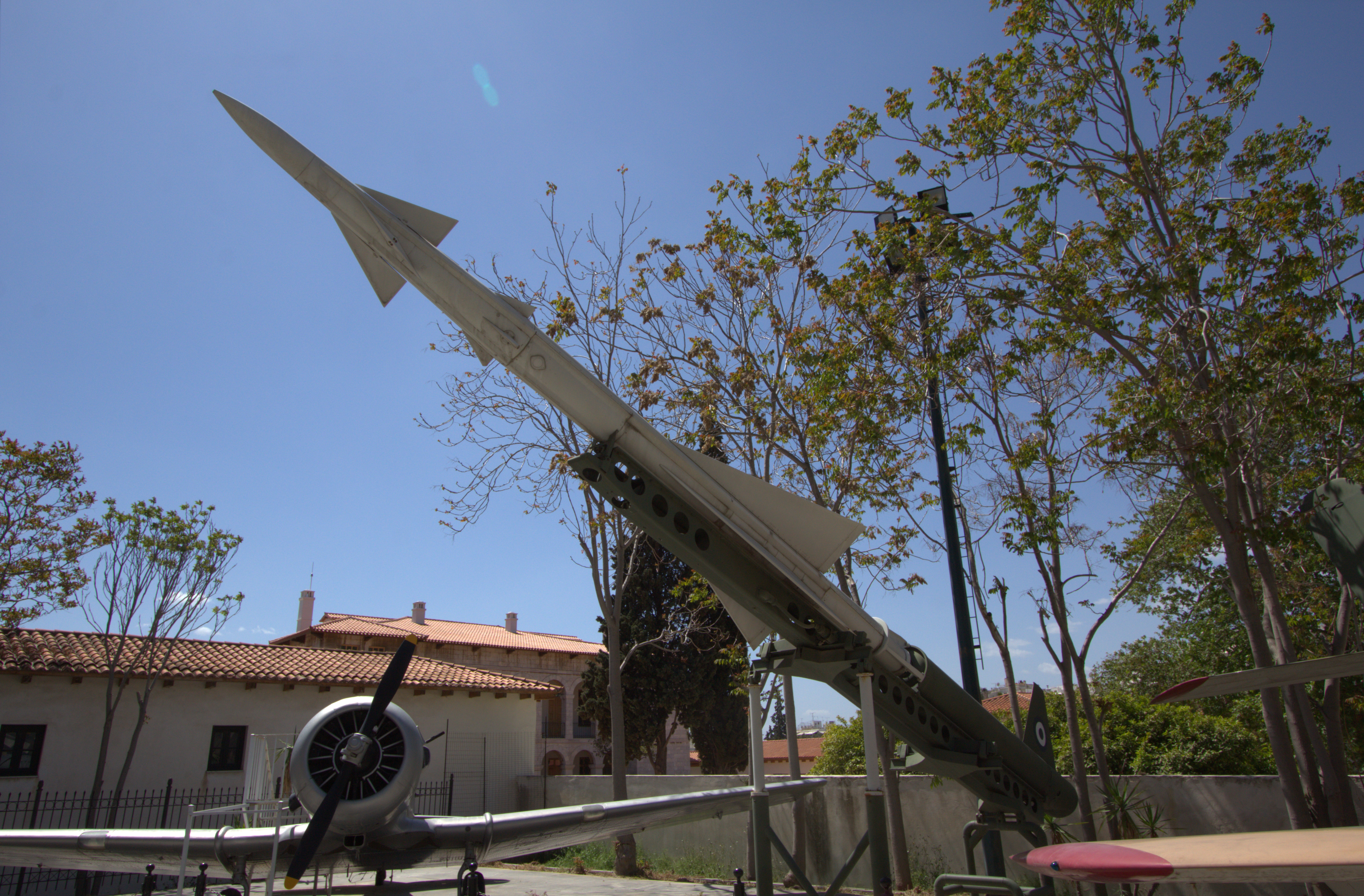
AIAS – anti-aircraft guided, ground & air missile

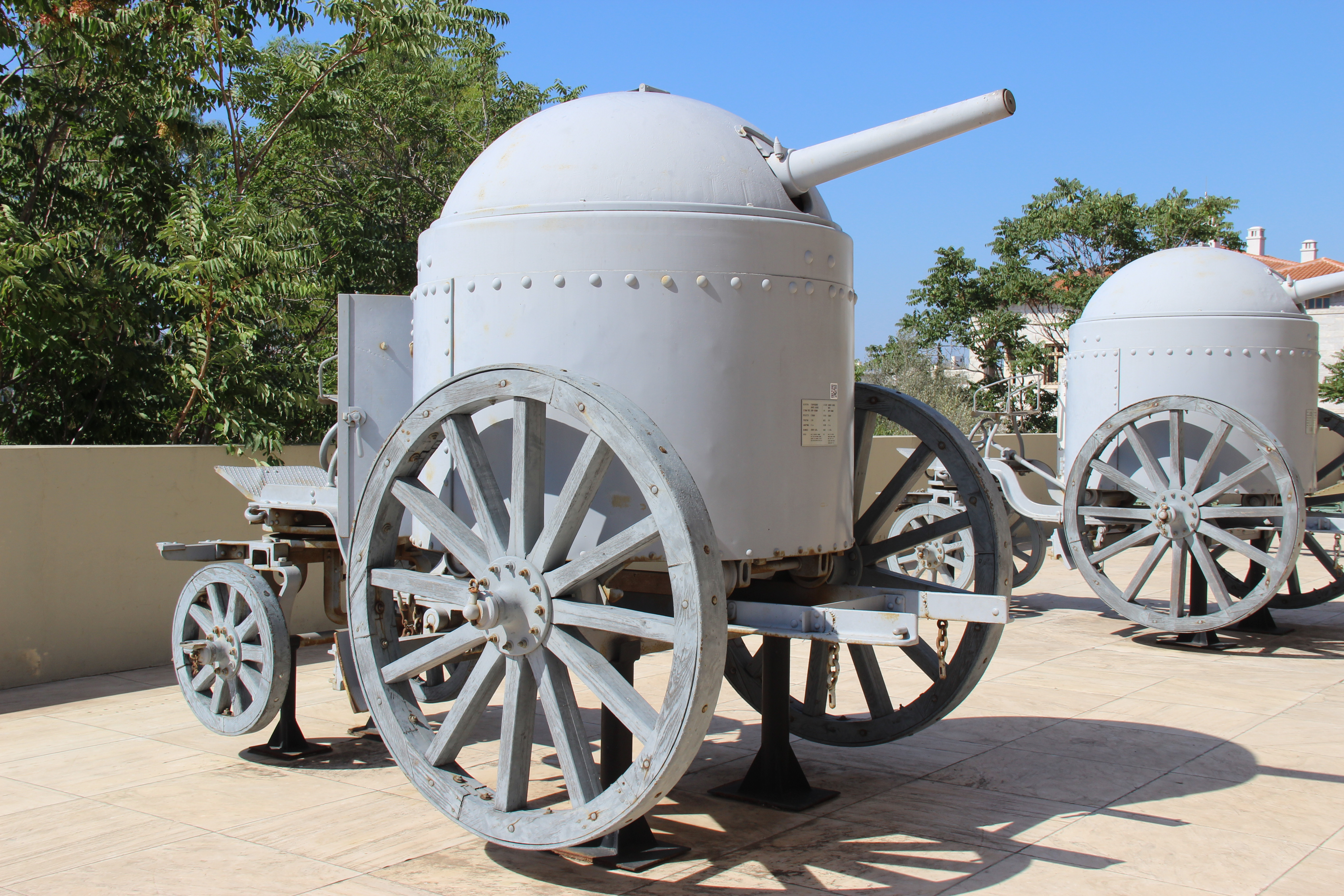
German 57mm armoured carriage captured from the Bulgarians during the First World War

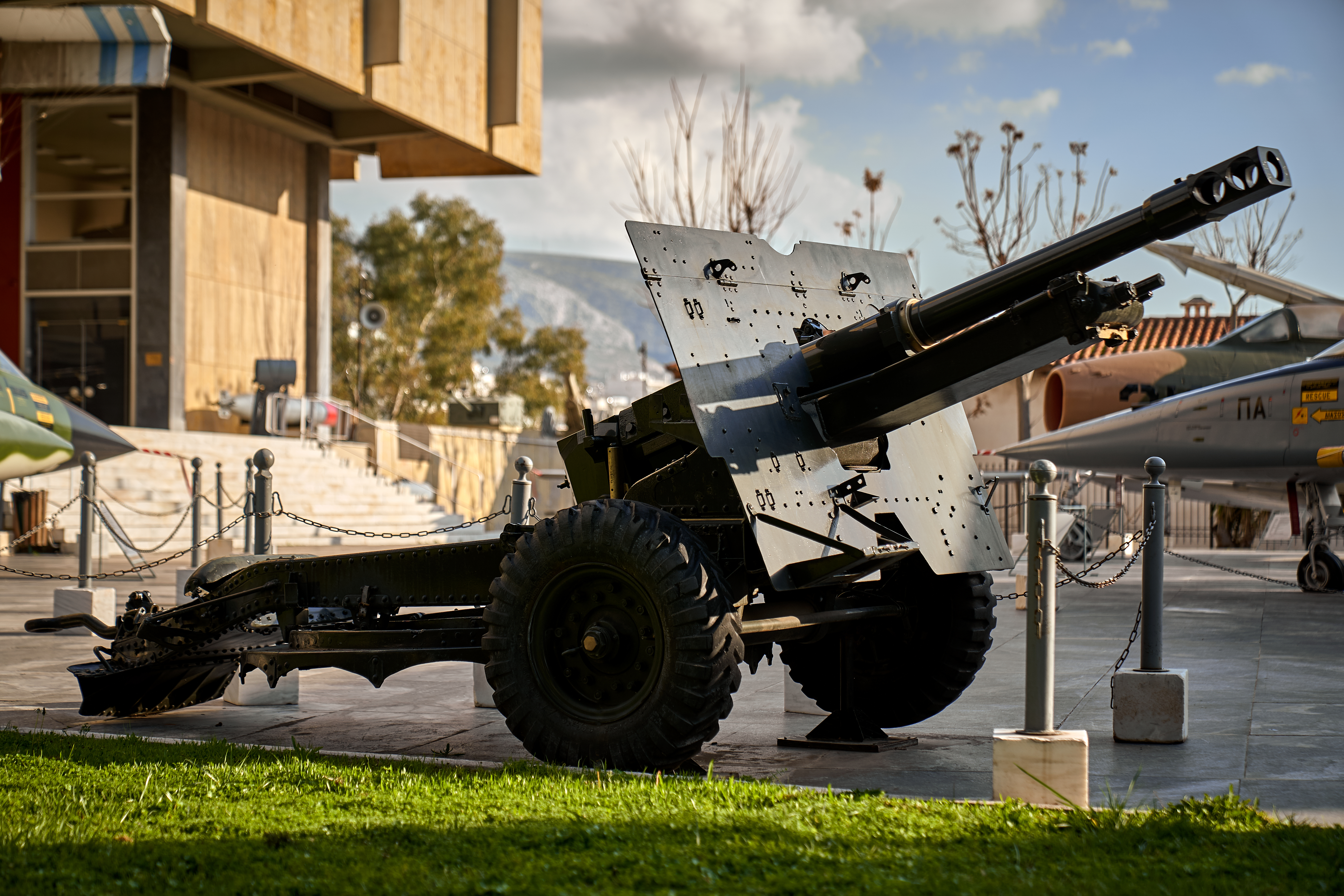
Howitzer QF 25 Pounder

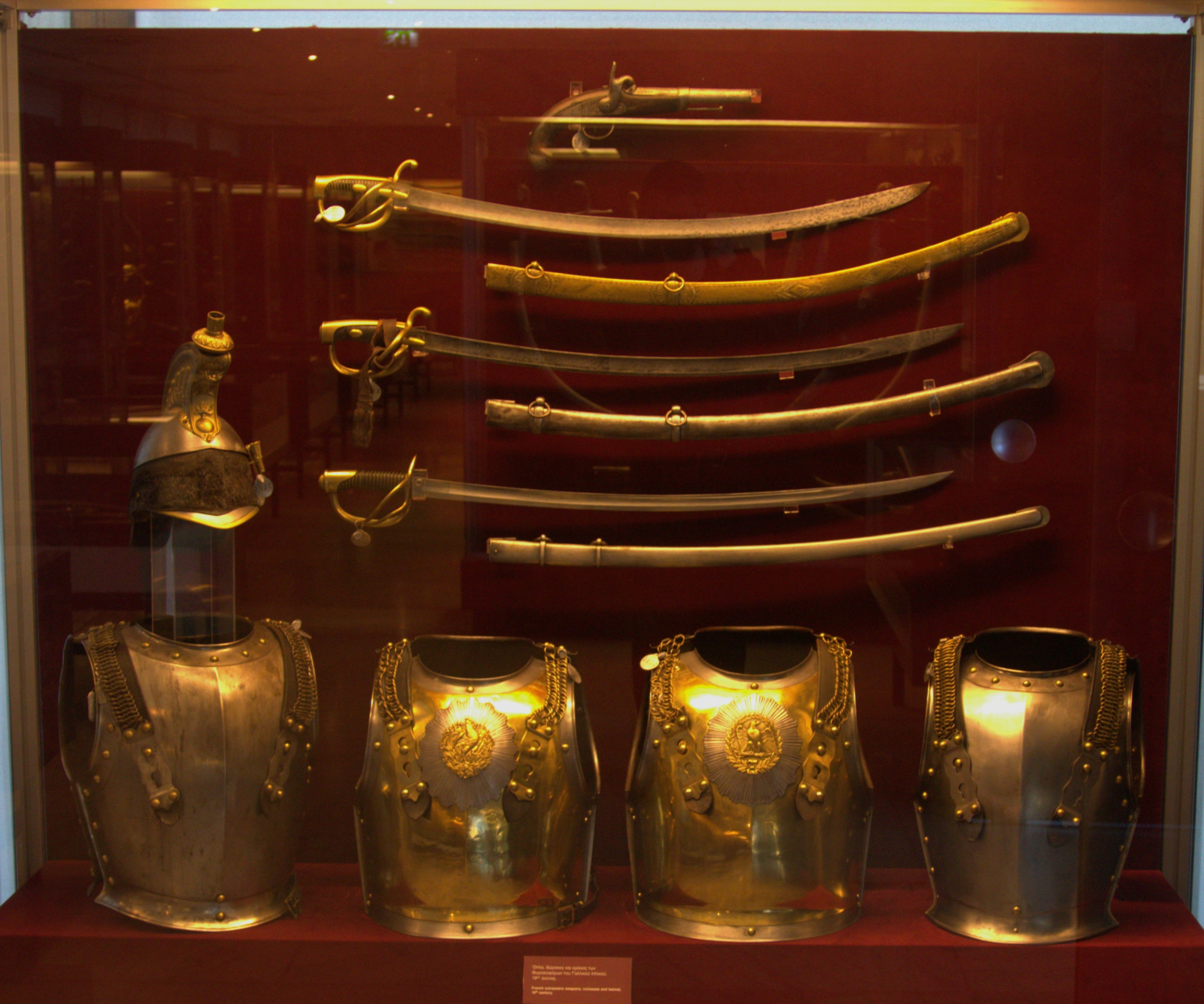
French 19th century cuirassiers weapons, breastplates and helmet

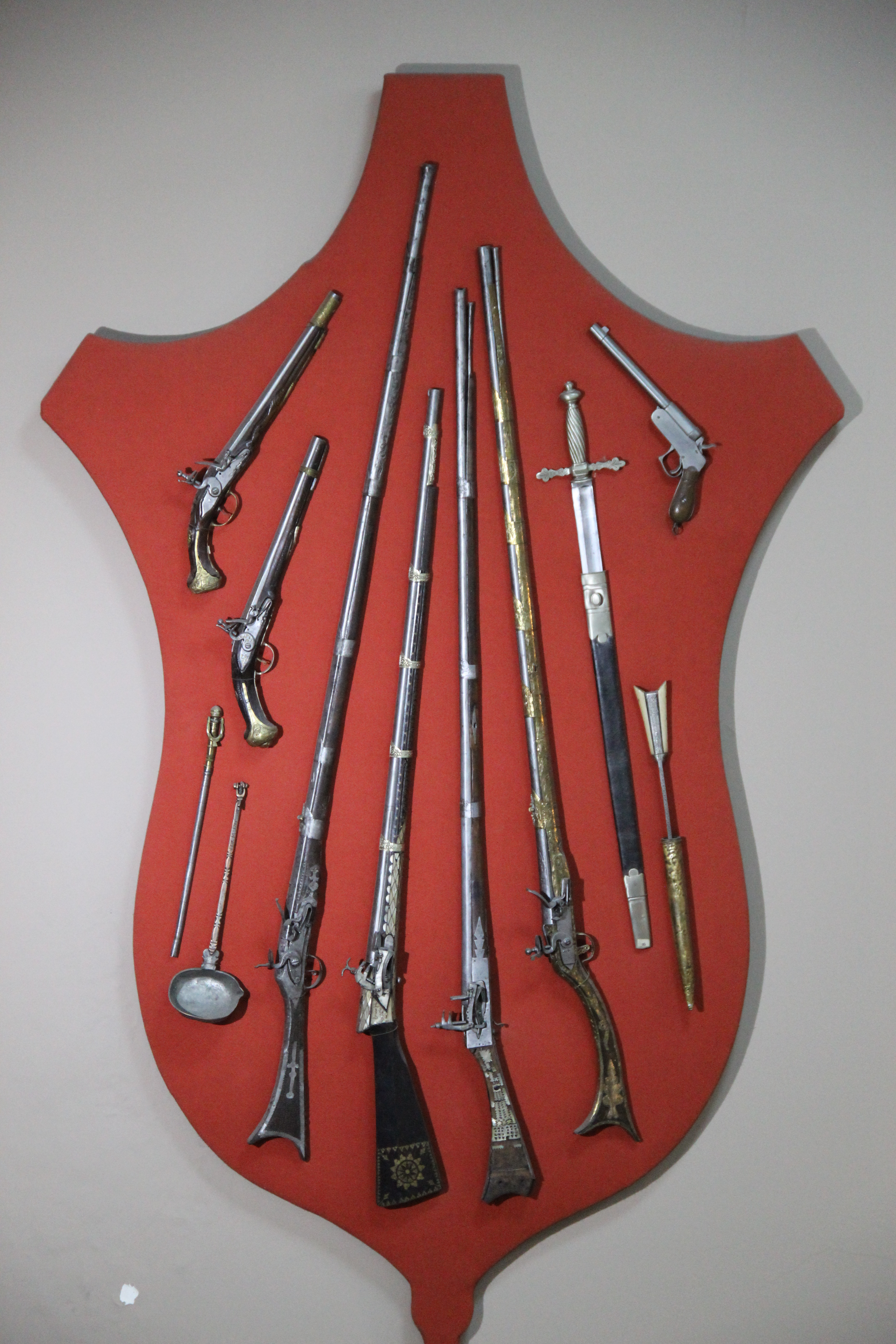
Collection of 19th century weaponry

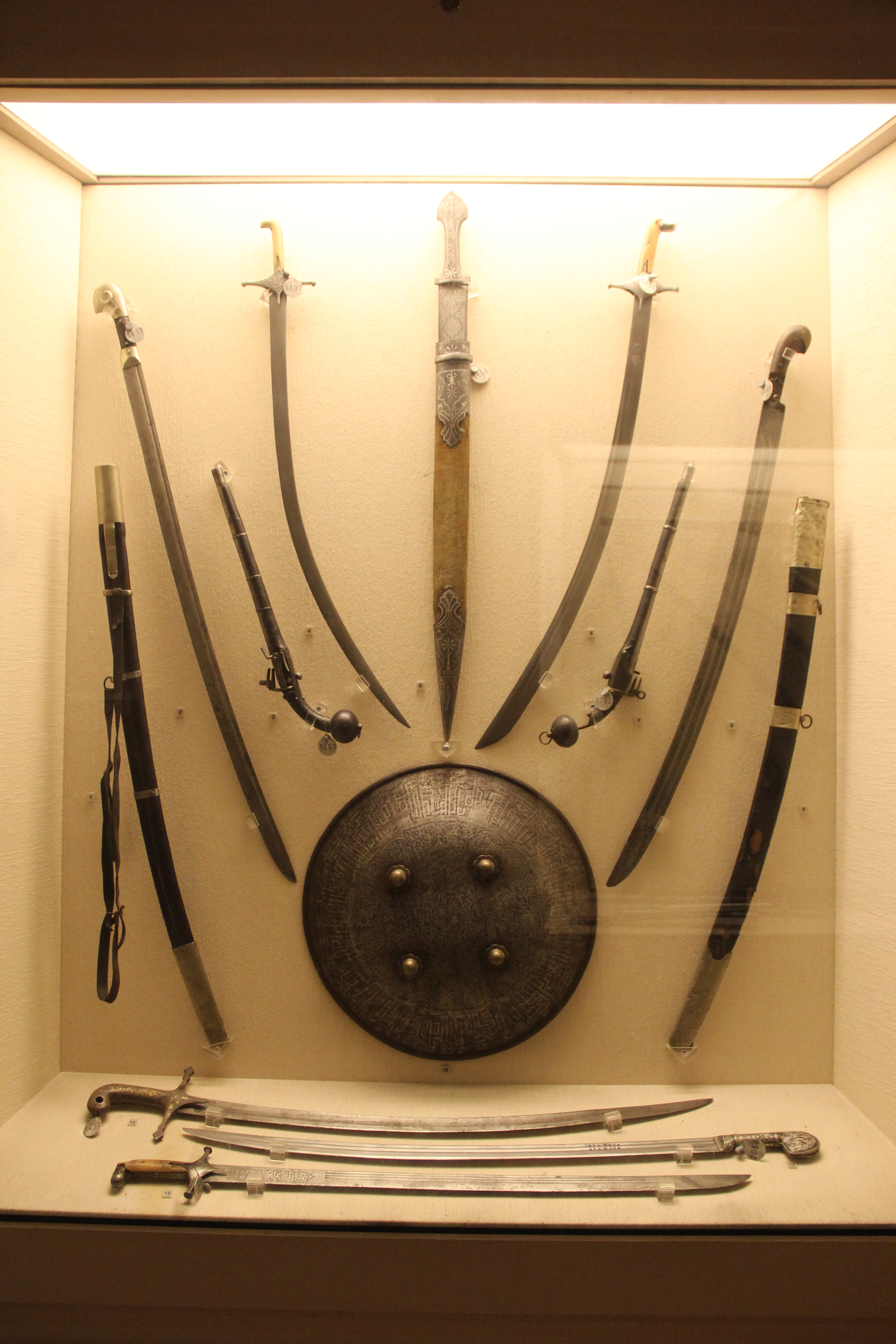
Collection of Cossack, Safavid, and Ottoman weaponry

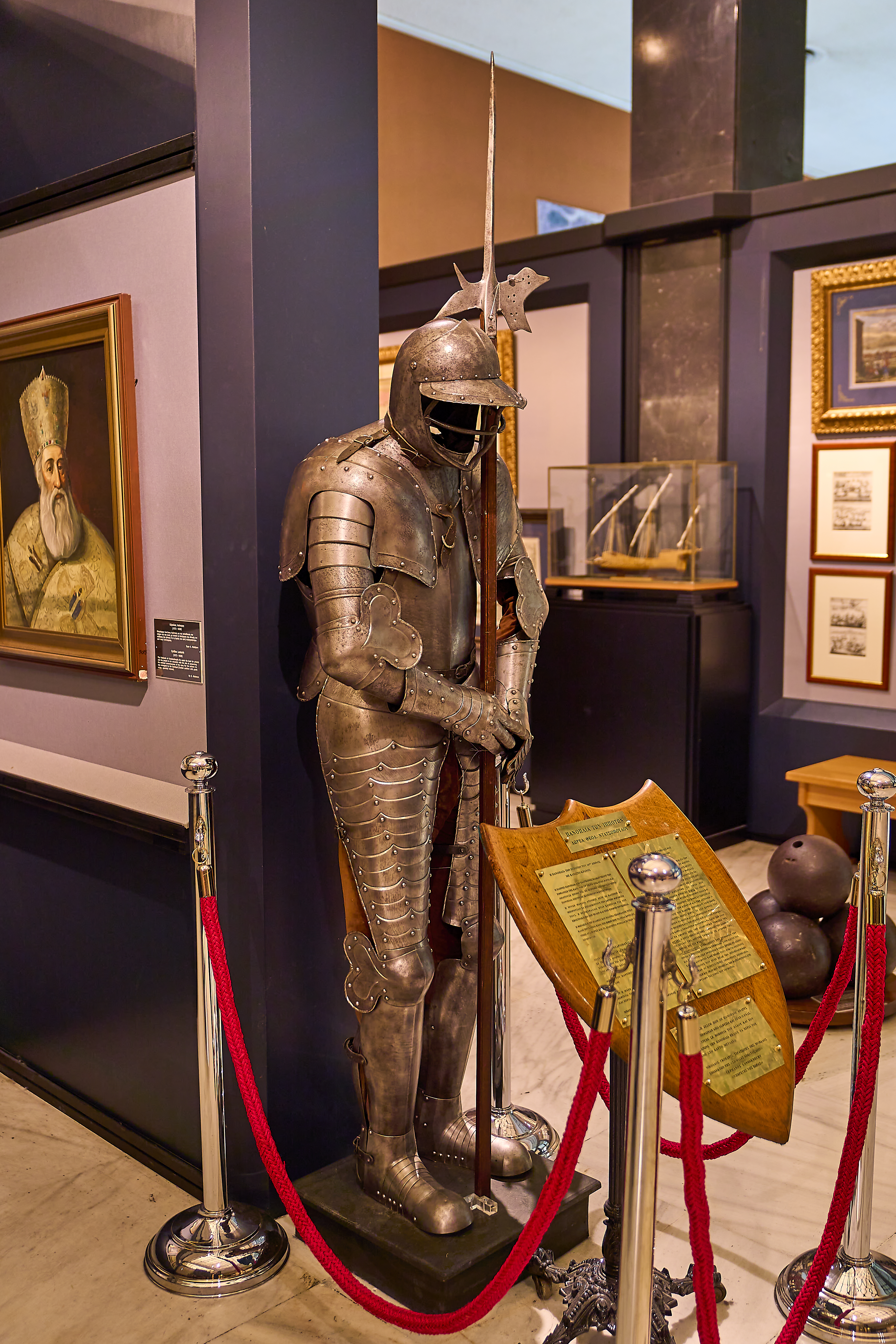
16th century European armour

== See also ==
- Category:Military and war museums in Greece
