= Greco-Turkish Mixed Arbitral Tribunal =

International judicial body established 1926

The Greco-Turkish Mixed Arbitral Tribunal was an international judicial body established under the Greco-Turkish Agreement of December 1, 1926, to resolve legal disputes arising from the compulsory population exchange between Greece and Turkey. It operated under the supervision of the League of Nations and played a crucial role in addressing conflicts related to property restitution, compensation claims, and jurisdictional disagreements stemming from the exchange.

== Background ==
The Treaty of Lausanne (1923) mandated the relocation of over 1.5 million people—Greek Orthodox Christians from Turkey to Greece and Muslims from Greece to Turkey—to create ethnically homogeneous states. This exchange, while aimed at reducing ethnic tensions, caused numerous disputes over properties, assets, and the interpretation of legal provisions

To address these issues, the Greco-Turkish Agreement of 1926 established the Greco-Turkish Mixed Arbitral Tribunal, which functioned alongside the Mixed Commission for the Exchange of Greek and Turkish Populations. While the commission managed logistical and administrative matters, the tribunal was responsible for adjudicating disputes related to the agreement.

== Structure and jurisdiction ==
The tribunal was composed of three members:

- One appointed by Greece
- One appointed by Turkey
- A neutral chairperson appointed by the Permanent Court of International Justice (PCIJ) or the League of Nations to ensure impartiality

Jurisdiction

The tribunal's jurisdiction included:

- Property disputes: Determining ownership and compensation for properties abandoned by relocated individuals.
- Financial claims: Resolving issues related to debts, unpaid rents, and contracts disrupted by the population exchange.
- Jurisdictional Challenges: Interpreting the powers of the Mixed Commission and ensuring the proper implementation of the 1926 agreement's provisions.
- Arbitration procedures: Addressing disputes referred to arbitration under Article IV of the Final Protocol annexed to the 1926 Agreement.

== Key cases and decision ==
=== Interpretation of the Greco-Turkish Agreement (1928) ===
In 1928, the League of Nations requested an advisory opinion from the Permanent Court of International Justice (PCIJ) regarding the tribunal's authority under Article IV of the Final Protocol. The PCIJ clarified that the Mixed Commission held the exclusive right to initiate arbitration and decide whether the conditions for arbitration were met.

This ruling was significant in defining the tribunal's scope of authority and streamlining arbitration processes. It also reinforced the independence of international bodies in resolving intergovernmental disputes.

=== Property restitution disputes ===
The tribunal dealt with numerous claims related to the valuation and compensation of properties left behind by displaced populations. These cases often involved complex questions of ownership, inheritance, and the valuation of abandoned assets.

== See also ==
- Interpretation of the Greco-Turkish Agreement
