= Article IV of the Final Protocol =

Part of the 1926 Greco-Turkish Agreement

Article IV of the Final Protocol refers to a key provision of the Greco-Turkish Agreement of December 1, 1926, which outlined procedures for resolving disputes arising from the compulsory population exchange between Greece and Turkey. The article established the framework for referring unresolved disagreements to arbitration, a mechanism critical for addressing the complex legal and logistical challenges resulting from the exchange.

== Background ==
The Greco-Turkish Agreement was signed to manage issues arising from the 1923 Treaty of Lausanne, which mandated the forced relocation of approximately 1.5 million Greek Orthodox Christians and Muslims between Greece and Turkey. While the Mixed Commission for the Exchange of Greek and Turkish Populations was tasked with implementing the exchange, disputes over properties, financial claims, and other matters frequently required arbitration to ensure resolution.

The agreement's "Article IV of the Final Protocol" provided a legal basis for escalating unresolved disputes to an arbitrator, under the supervision of the Greco-Turkish Mixed Arbitral Tribunal. This provision sought to clarify the processes and authorities involved in dispute resolution, ensuring that such conflicts could be managed effectively.

== Key Provisions of Article IV ==
The main elements of the article included:

- Conditions for Arbitration: The article outlined specific conditions under which unresolved disputes could be referred to an arbitrator, requiring that initial efforts by the Mixed Commission to resolve the matter be exhausted.
- Authority of the Mixed Commission: It granted the Mixed Commission the authority to determine whether the conditions for arbitration had been met.
- Exclusive Right to Refer Disputes: Article IV established that the Mixed Commission alone had the right to initiate arbitration and refer cases to the Greco-Turkish Mixed Arbitral Tribunal.
- Procedural Framework: The article provided guidelines for how disputes should be documented, presented, and resolved by the arbitrator or tribunal.

== Interpretation and dispute ==
In 1928, a disagreement arose between Greece and Turkey regarding the interpretation of Article IV, particularly over who had the authority to refer cases to arbitration. The League of Nations referred the matter to the Permanent Court of International Justice (PCIJ) for an advisory opinion.

The PCIJ ruled that the Mixed Commission:

- had sole responsibility for deciding whether arbitration conditions were met.
- held the exclusive authority to initiate arbitration, ensuring the process remained impartial and insulated from government interference.

This ruling clarified the scope of Article IV and resolved ambiguities in its implementation, reinforcing the independence of international arbitration mechanisms.

== Impact and legacy ==
The interpretation and application of Article IV of the Final Protocol had significant implications for international law and arbitration. Its key contributions include:

- Strengthening Arbitration Frameworks: The provision set a precedent for using arbitration to resolve complex disputes involving multiple governments and displaced populations.
- International Procedural Law: The ruling of the PCIJ provided clarity on the authority of specialized commissions, influencing the design of similar mechanisms in subsequent treaties.
- Post-Conflict Resolution: The article's framework demonstrated the potential for international law to mediate disputes in the aftermath of forced migrations, property restitution, and ethnic conflicts.

While the legal framework established under Article IV was specific to the Greco-Turkish population exchange, it has been studied as a model for addressing disputes arising from other post-conflict situations, particularly in the context of forced migrations.

== See also ==
- Interpretation of the Greco-Turkish Agreement
