= Interpretation of the Greco-Turkish Agreement =

1928 advisory opinion by the World Court

Interpretation of the Greco-Turkish Agreement refers to an advisory opinion issued by the Permanent Court of International Justice (PCIJ) under the League of Nations. The case involved a dispute over the implementation of the 1923 Treaty of Lausanne, particularly the compulsory population exchange between Greece and Turkey and the resolution of disputes arising from the process.

== Background ==
The Treaty of Lausanne, signed on July 24, 1923, marked the conclusion of hostilities between the Allied Powers and the Ottoman Empire following World War I. It established the modern boundaries of Turkey and included provisions for the forced relocation of Greek Orthodox Christians from Turkey to Greece and Muslims from Greece to Turkey. This exchange, involving over 1.5 million people, aimed to reduce ethnic tensions but led to significant challenges, particularly concerning the properties and financial assets left behind by those displaced. The population exchange was one of the largest forced migrations of the 20th century, resulting in immense social and economic disruption. Both countries faced logistical challenges, including overcrowded refugee camps, disputes over land ownership, and financial burdens.

To address these issues, the treaty established a Mixed Commission for the Exchange of Greek and Turkish Populations, tasked with resolving disputes related to property valuation, financial compensation, and logistical arrangements. However, disagreements between Greece and Turkey regarding the commission's powers and procedures gave rise to legal disputes requiring international arbitration.

== Greco-Turkish Agreement of 1926 ==
The Greco-Turkish Agreement of December 1, 1926, was created to address the practical issues arising from the population exchange, particularly the valuation of properties abandoned by those who were relocated. The agreement established a Mixed Commission to handle disputes, including the valuation and compensation for the properties that were left behind. This commission's mandate extended to assessing financial reparations and ensuring equitable treatment of displaced populations. However, disagreements arose over how the commission was to interpret and implement these terms, especially concerning the right to refer certain unresolved issues to arbitration.

The Final Protocol of the agreement, especially Article IV, provided the framework for submitting disputes to an arbitrator under the supervision of the Greco-Turkish Mixed Arbitral Tribunal in Constantinople (now Istanbul). But Greece and Turkey had different interpretations of the commission's powers, particularly in terms of jurisdictional authority and the procedures for arbitration

== Dispute ==
One key issue was the interpretation of Article IV of the Final Protocol annexed to the 1926 Greco-Turkish Agreement. This provision outlined conditions under which unresolved disputes could be referred to an arbitrator. The question arose whether the Mixed Commission alone had the authority to determine if such conditions were met and whether it held the exclusive right to initiate arbitration. Disputes over jurisdiction often reflected broader tensions in Greco-Turkish relations, as both sides sought to assert their national interests through international mechanisms.

In 1928 the League of Nations referred the matter to the PCIJ for clarification. The request sought to determine:

1. Whether the Mixed Commission was solely responsible for deciding if conditions for arbitration existed.

2. Whether the right to refer matters to arbitration belonged exclusively to the commission.

== Ruling of the Court ==
On August 28, 1928, the PCIJ issued its advisory opinion. The Court concluded:

1. The Mixed Commission alone had the authority to assess whether the conditions specified in Article IV of the Final Protocol were met.
2. Only the Mixed Commission held the right to initiate arbitration for unresolved disputes.

This opinion aimed to resolve the ambiguity regarding the commission's powers and ensure that the arbitration process would function smoothly without interference from the two governments involved. The decision was seen as an important clarification of international procedural law, particularly regarding the management of complex disputes arising from territorial and population shifts. This ruling not only resolved the immediate ambiguity but also reinforced the role of specialized arbitral bodies in maintaining international order under the League of Nations framework.

== Impact of the ruling ==
The Court's decision had significant implications for international arbitration and governance under the League of Nations. It reaffirmed the authority of specialized commissions to manage sensitive intergovernmental disputes, providing a framework for similar mechanisms in future treaties. The PCIJ ruling influenced subsequent cases involving forced population movements and property disputes, solidifying the principle that impartial arbitral bodies could serve as effective mediators in post-conflict situations.

The ruling also contributed to the gradual normalization of Greco-Turkish relations by resolving ambiguities in the population exchange process, although tensions over ethnic and territorial issues persisted.

== Legacy and importance ==
The Interpretation of the Greco-Turkish Agreement remains an important case in the history of international law, particularly for its role in defining the authority of arbitral commissions and addressing the challenges of post-conflict reconciliation. It also serves as a precedent for managing disputes involving forced migrations, displaced populations, and property restitution.

Legal scholars have emphasized its contribution to developing international procedural law, particularly the jurisdictional clarity it provided to mixed arbitral bodies. In modern discussions, the case is often cited as a historical example of the complexities and ethical dilemmas of forced population exchanges. The involvement of the PCIJ highlighted the potential of international law to mediate deeply contentious issues, though such efforts were not without limitations.

== History of the Treaty of Lausanne ==
The Treaty of Lausanne replaced the earlier Treaty of Sèvres (1920), which the Turkish National Movement rejected during the Turkish War of Independence. Lausanne was instrumental in establishing the Republic of Turkey and reshaping the geopolitical landscape in the Eastern Mediterranean after World War I. Its provisions for the population exchange reflected a controversial approach to ethnic conflict resolution, involving mass relocations to achieve demographic homogeneity. While it achieved some degree of political stability, the human cost of displacement and loss of cultural heritage remains a subject of critical reflection.

== See also ==
- Population exchange between Greece and Turkey
- Treaty of Lausanne
- Greece–Turkey relations
- Greece–Ottoman Empire relations
- Treaty of Sèvres
- Greco-Turkish War (1919–1922)
- League of Nations
- Convention Concerning the Exchange of Greek and Turkish Populations
- Mixed Commission for the Exchange of Greek and Turkish Populations
- Greco-Turkish Mixed Arbitral Tribunal
