= Kalyvia, Laconia =

Kalyvia Καλύβια
- Community
- Location within Greece
- Coordinates: 36°40.1′N 22°31.6′E
- Country: Greece
- Administrative region: Peloponnese
- Regional unit: Laconia
- Municipality: East Mani
- Municipal unit: Gytheio
- Elevation: 81 m (266 ft)

Population (2021)
  - Community: 121
- Time zone: UTC+2 (EET)
  - Summer (DST): UTC+3 (EEST)
- Postal code: 232 00
- Area code: 27330
- Vehicle registration: ΑΚ

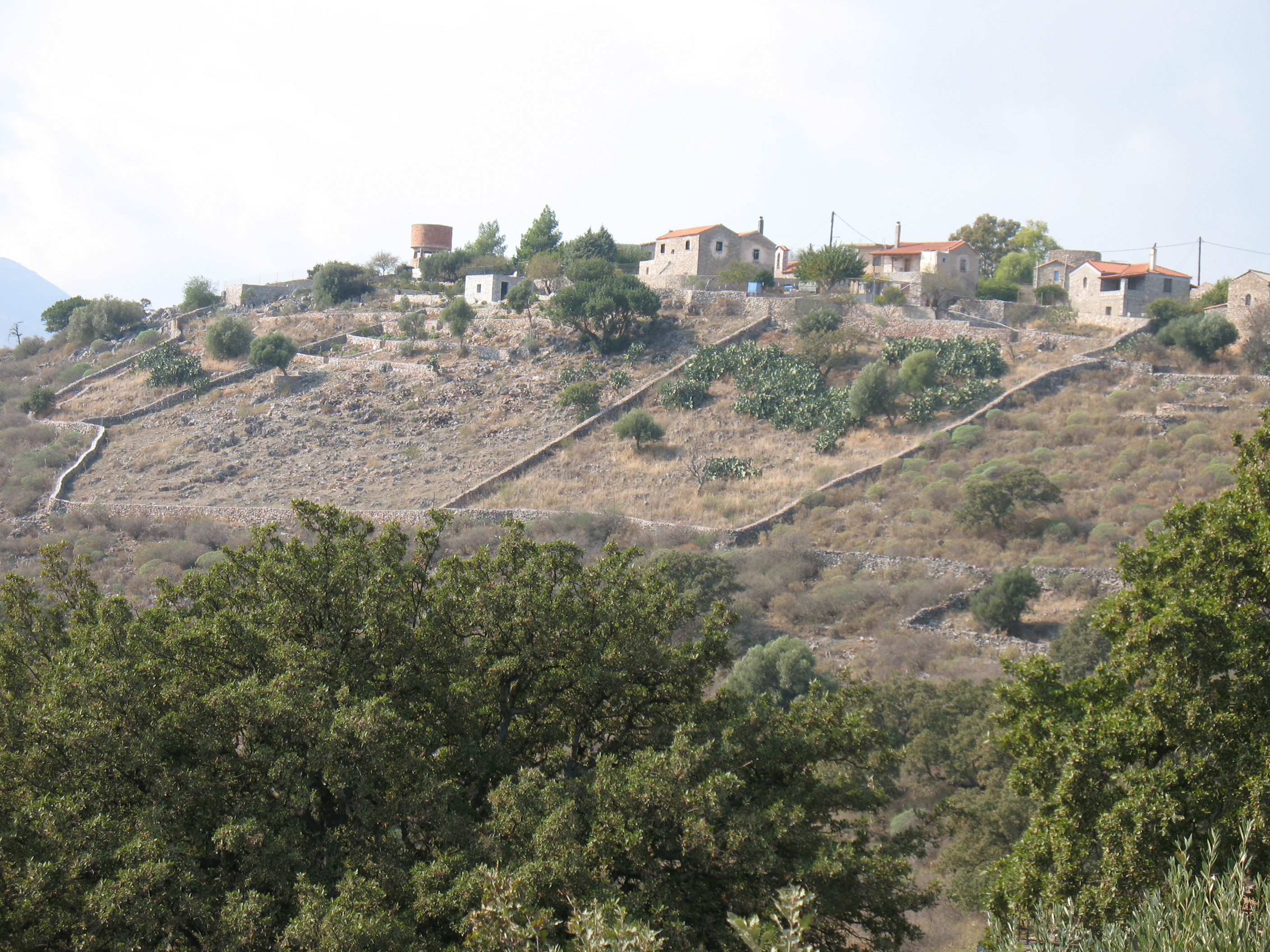

Κalyvia (Greek: Καλύβια) is a village in Laconia, southern Greece. It is part of the municipal unit Gytheio. Kalyvia is situated on a peninsula in the Laconian Gulf, 3 km (1.9 mi) east of Skoutari and 11 km (6.8 mi) south of Gytheio.

== Historical population ==
Year	Population
1981	135
1991	42
2001	129
2011	86
2021	121

== See also ==
- List of settlements in Laconia
