= Battle of Vromopigada =

1770 battle

Coordinates: 36°40′N 22°30′E

- Part of Ottoman invasion of Mani (1770)
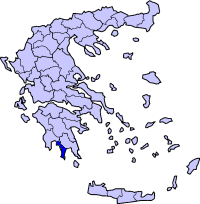
- Map of Greece, with the Mani Peninsula highlighted in blue.
Date	1770
Location	Vromopigada
Result	Maniot victory

Belligerents
Mani	Ottoman Empire

Commanders and leaders
Exarchos Grigorakis; Zanetos Grigorakis	Hatzi Osman †

Strength
7,000	16,000

Casualties and losses
Unknown	10,000

The Battle of Vromopigada was fought between the Ottoman Turks and the Maniots of Mani in 1770. The location of the battle was in a plain between the two towns of Skoutari and Parasyros. The battle ended in a Greek victory.

== Prelude ==
Following the Venetian victory over the Ottoman Empire in the Seventh Ottoman–Venetian War (1714–1718), the Peloponnese once again returned to Ottoman hands. However, the autonomous Mani, who had refused to accept Ottoman sovereignty in the first imperial occupation of the Peloponnese, once again rejected Ottoman rule. The Maniots through an agent they had in Russia began conspiring with Catherine the Great and Count Alexei Grigoryevich Orlov. In 1770, terms were agreed and a Russian fleet sailed into the Aegean Sea and landing in Mani en route destroying an Ottoman fleet at the Battle of Chesma.

After initial success, the Orlov Revolt ended in failure. Arguments between Orlov, the Russian leader, and Ioannis Mavromichalis, the Maniot leader led to the separation of the armies. Mavromichalis's army suffered a devastating defeat at Rizomilo in Messenia against the Ottoman army with only Mavromichalis surviving. Meanwhile, the Russian army having made no long term gains retreated. The Ottomans had, meanwhile, unleashed mercenaries of Muslim Albanians (also known as Turkoalbanians) on Greece. They pillaged their way through the Peloponnese where they massacred Greek civilians in revenge for massacres and destruction of properties that Christian forces committed against Muslim civilians.

They launched several incursions into Mani but they were all beaten back with heavy casualties. This string of defeat aggravated the Ottoman Pasha in the Peloponnese, Hatzi Osman and he mustered an army of 16,000 men and invaded Mani.

== Battle ==
Meanwhile, a Maniot force consisting of 3,000 men and 2,000 women under the command of Exarchos Grigorakis and his nephew Zanetos Grigorakis had mustered in the hills above the town of Parasyros, which were known as Trikefali, and had fortified themselves. Osman, meanwhile, had advanced with his army to Agio Pigada (a plain that lay between Parasyros and Skoutari) and from there sent envoys demanding the surrender of the Maniots. However, the Maniots were hesitant in sending envoys back because if the answer was negative, Osman would have the envoys executed.

Three old men, two priests and a layman volunteered to go to the Turkish camp. They were brought to the pasha and, without bowing, asked him what he wanted from the poor but freedom-loving Maniots. The pasha demanded that the Maniots give, because they had made an alliance with the enemies [of the Turks] the Russians and revolted against the Sultan, all their guns, ten captains' children as hostages, and pay every year the capitation. The Maniot envoys replied that the Maniots preferred to die than give their guns or children, and couldn't pay taxes because of the poverty of their land. Osman, infuriated by their answer, had them executed and mutilated before planting their limbs on stakes.

When the Maniots saw the fate of their envoys they decided how to defeat the Ottomans. During the night, a force of 1,500 Maniots outflanked the Ottoman positions and approached from the Turkish rear. Meanwhile, the main Maniot force attacked the Ottomans as they slept. The Ottomans, surprised by this night attack started to flee but were cut off by the Maniots at their rear. The remaining Turks managed to retreat to Mystras.

== Sources ==
- Peter Greenhalgh and Edward Eliopoulos. Deep into Mani: Journey to the southern tip of Greece. London: Trinity Press, 1985. ISBN 0-571-13524-2
