= Petros Saroglos =

Petros Saroglos / Saroglou
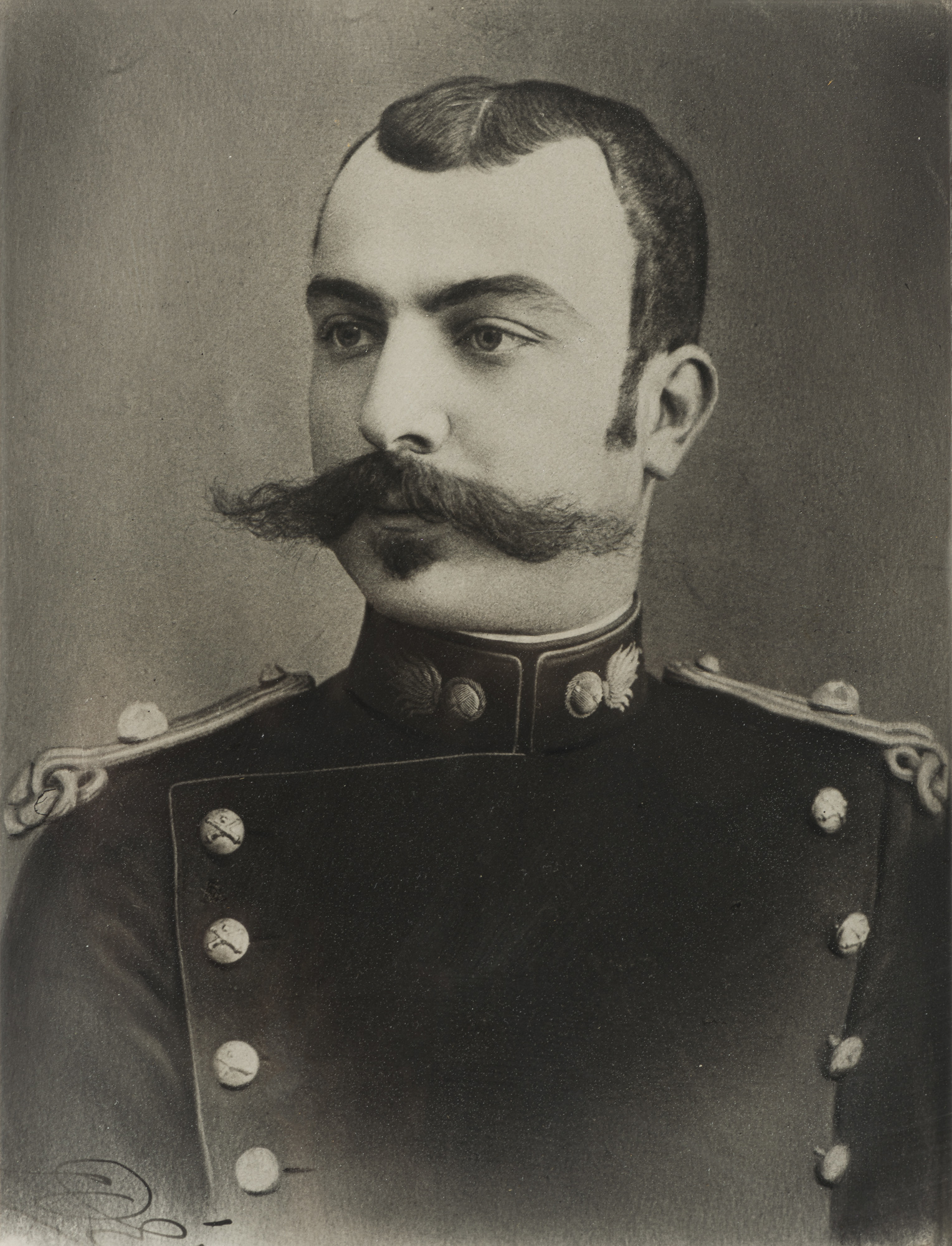
- Saroglos in uniform
- Native name: Πέτρος Σάρογλος/Σαρόγλου
- Born: 1864; Athens, Kingdom of Greece
- Died: 1920 (aged 55–56) Loutraki, Kingdom of Greece
- Cause of death: Heart attack
- Allegiance: Kingdom of Greece
- Branch: Hellenic Army
- Service years: 1888–1920
- Conflicts: Greco-Turkish War (1897); Macedonian Struggle; Balkan Wars; First Balkan War; Second Balkan War; World War I; Macedonian Front
- Alma mater: Hellenic Army Academy
- Other work: Member of the HMC

Petros Saroglos or Saroglou (Greek: Πέτρος Σάρογλος/Σαρόγλου; Athens, 1864 – Loutraki, 1920) was a Greek military officer, collector and benefactor.

== Biography ==
Born in Athens, Petros Saroglos was a member of a wealthy Greek merchant family previously active in the Danubian Principalities. At the age of 14 he entered the Hellenic Military Academy, and graduated 7 years later as second lieutenant of artillery. He fought during the Greco-Turkish War of 1897 but the following year left the army, becoming a reservist. A proponent of the irredentist Megali Idea, he was involved in the Macedonian Struggle and later returned to action during the Balkan Wars and the First World War.

Saroglos was also an avid collector and a benefactor. His wealth enabled him to create an important and varied collection which included weapons, artworks (mainly paintings of Nikiforos Lytras, Nikolaos Gyzis, Konstantinos Volanakis and others), ancient coins, jewelry, furniture, taxidermied animal heads etc. from all over the world. He also donated significant amounts to schools, hospitals and Greek Orthodox parishes.

Saroglos died of a heart attack in 1920 in Loutraki, a seaside resort close to Athens. According to his will, the Hellenic Armed Forces Officers Club inherited the vast majority of his fortune.

Nowadays his collections are exhibited in various museums and cultural institutions including the Numismatic Museum of Athens, Byzantine and Christian Museum, Athens War Museum, Goulandris Natural History Museum as well as the Sarogleio Mansion, the building of the Hellenic Armed Forces Officers Club in Athens, constructed from 1928 until 1932 through Saroglos' bequest.
