= Thucydides Valentis =

Greek architect and academic

Thucydides P. Valentis
- Born: 1908; Cairo
- Died: April 4, 1982 (aged 73–74); Athens
- Education: National Technical University of Athens
- Occupations: Architect, academic
- Years active: 1930–1974
- Buildings: Chatziantoniou Residence; Kyriakopoulos Mansion; Michaelides Brothers' apartment building Air Force Pension Fund building Athens War Museum

Thucydides P. Valentis (Greek: Θουκυδίδης Π. Βαλεντής; Cairo, 1908 – Athens, 1982) was a Greek architect and academic. He was one of the main representatives of the architectural generation of the 1930s, as well as one of the pioneers of modernism in Greece.

== Biography ==
He was born in Cairo, Egypt, in 1908, to Greek parents. He attended the Ampeteios School located in his hometown and in 1925 he settled in Athens and entered the Metsovian National Technical University of Athens. After finishing his studies in 1930, he started his professional activity at the Ministry of Education, preparing studies for the construction of new school buildings as a member of a group of architects that included Dimitris Pikionis, Patroclus Karantinos, Ioannis Despotopoulos and others.

In the following years up until the outbreak of World War II, he initially collaborated with his fellow student Polyvios Michaelides and was later employed at the Public Works Directorate of the Ministry of Aviation. In 1934 he participated with other architects of the younger generation in the so-called First Architectural Exhibition held in Athens. Valentis typical projects for this period are the Chatziantoniou Residence in Athens, the Kyriakopoulos Mansion in Nea Smyrni and the Michaelides Brothers' apartment building in Exarchia.

With the outbreak of the Greek-Italian War he became involved in the design and construction of military infrastructure. In 1943 he was appointed as lecturer at the Building Chair of the Faculty of Architecture at Metsovian National Technical University. After the end of the war, in 1946, he went to the United Kingdom for short period studies following an invitation of the British Council and in 1947 he undertook the design of the Air Force Pension Fund building in Athens. He remained with the Air Ministry until 1960. In the subsequent years he was mainly involved in the design of commercial and office buildings.

In 1961 he was elected full professor at the Chair of Building Engineering at the Faculty of Engineering of the Aristotle University of Thessaloniki. In 1965 he returned to Athens where he was elected professor in the same field at the NTUA until his retirement in 1974. Some of the projects in which he participated during that period, mainly in a consulting capacity, are the OTE buildings in Thessaloniki and the Athens War Museum. He died in Athens on April 4, 1982.
