= Ottoman invasion of Mani (1770) =

Military campaign in Greece

1770 Ottoman invasion of Mani
- Part of the Orlov revolt
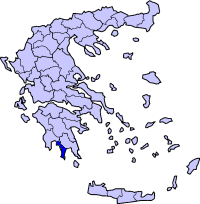
- Map of Greece with Mani highlighted.
Date	1770
Location	Mani, Greece
Result	Maniot victory

Belligerents
Mani	Ottoman Empire

Commanders and leaders
Exarchos Grigorakis; Tzanetos Grigorakis	Hadji Osman †

Strength
Unknown	10,000

The 1770 Ottoman invasion of Mani was one of a series of invasions by the Ottomans to subdue the Maniots. Mani was one region of Greece that the Ottomans had not occupied due to the rough terrain and the rebellious spirit of Maniots. The Maniots caused damage to the Ottomans by allying with the Venetians whenever there was a war between Venice and the Ottomans, and also habitually engaged in piracy.

After the failed Orlov revolt of 1770, in which the Maniots took part, Muslim Albanians (also known as Turkoalbanians) ravaged the Peloponnese and kept the Maniots cooped up inside Mani. In 1770 the Ottoman bey of the Peloponnese saw his chance to invade Mani and subjugate them once and for all.

With a large force of Muslim Albanians he penetrated into Mani and laid siege to the tower of the powerful Grigorakos of Ayeranos and Skoutari. The Grigorakos' tower held out for three days before being destroyed. The Ottomans then fought a battle against the Maniot army and lost and were forced to withdraw from Mani.

== Prelude ==
The failed Orlov Revolt of 1770 was a disaster for Mani. The Maniots were bottled up inside Mani and were forced to pay a tribute of 1,500 groschen to the Ottomans. The Ottomans also appointed a Maniot bey to govern the Maniots. The Ottomans sent parties of Muslim Albanians troops to raid Mani. The Maniots still caused some trouble for the Ottomans with their ships.

The Ottoman pasha of the Peloponnese, Hatzi Osman, thought it was his chance to take over Mani once and for all and to impress the sultan. He gathered a large and seasoned group of Muslim Albanians soldiers to accompany him in his invasion of Mani. When the Maniots heard of the Ottoman preparations they gathered their army under the command of Éxarchos Grigorakis and his nephew Tzanetos Grigorakis who were from the powerful clan of Ayeranos and Skoutari in the mountains above Parasyros and waited for the Ottomans to arrive.

== Invasion ==
The Ottomans then headed to Skoutari only to find it abandoned except for the Grigorakos' tower in the centre of the town which was garrisoned by fifteen men under the command of Yanis Katsanos. The Ottomans laid siege to the tower, but were repulsed for the first three days by the small force. On the third night Hasan Ghazi, frustrated by not having captured the tower, had it undermined. Once the mine was completed, he loaded it with gunpowder, which he ignited, killing all the men in the tower.

The Ottoman army then proceeded to the plain between Parasyros and Skoutari which was called 'Agio Pigada' which means 'Holy Wells' because of the monastery on the hill above the plain being surrounded by wells. The Maniot army advance to Parasyros and sent three brothers as envoys to Hasan Ghazi. They demanded that Hasan Ghazi and his men retreat or they would face to fight the Maniot army. Seeing that his army outnumbered than the Maniot army, he responded by beheading the Maniots' envoys and sending their heads to the Maniots on silver plates.

The infuriated Maniot army charged down the hill, and before the Ottomans had a chance to prepare, the Maniots were upon them. The battle ended in a rout with the Ottoman army suffering heavy casualties. The rest of the Ottoman army retreated. The Maniots had nowhere to bury so many corpses, so they threw them down wells. The plain later got the name 'Vromopigada,' which means 'Dirty Wells'.

== Aftermath ==
The Ottomans then tried to destroy Zanetos in 1803 and 1807. The Ottomans tried to subdue Mani again in 1815 by capturing Skoutari but the men of Skoutari beat back the attack and in 1821 the rest of Greece declared their independence from the Ottomans.

== Sources ==
- Peter Greenhalgh and Edward Eliopoulos. Deep into Mani: Journey to the Southern Tip of Greece. ISBN 0-571-13524-2
- Philip Ramp. Mani.
- Γιάννη Χ. Πουμελιώτη. Ηρωίδες της Λακωνίας και της Μάνης Όλης (1453–1944). ISBN 960-87030-1-8
