= Ottoman invasion of Mani (1803) =

1803 Ottoman invasion of Mani
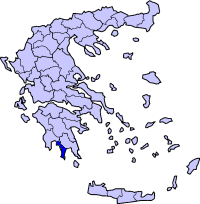
- Map of Greece with Mani highlighted.
Date	1803
Location	Mani, Greece
Result	Tzanetos Grigorakis retreats from the rest of the Peloponnese; Ottomans fail to conquer Mani
Territorial changes	None

Belligerents
Mani	Ottoman Empire

Commanders and leaders
Tzanetos Grigorakis	Kapudan Pasha

The 1803 Ottoman Invasion of Mani was one of a series of invasions by the Ottomans to subdue the Maniots. Mani was the only region of Greece that the Ottomans had not occupied due to the rough terrain and the rebellious spirit of the Maniots. The Maniots caused damage to the Ottomans by allying with the Venetians whenever there was a war between Venice and the Ottomans; they also were pirates.

From 1798, Tzanetos Grigorakis, the bey of Mani, was plotting with French agents sent by Napoleon to organise a Maniot revolt in the Peloponnese while Napoleon attacked the Levant. Once the Ottomans heard this, they had Grigorakis disposed and outlawed. Grigorakis however continued to communicate with the French and they sent him a shipment of weapons. Once the Ottomans heard of this, they sent an army under the command of the Kapudan Pasha to lay siege to Grigorakis's island fort on Marathonisi. After a short siege Grigorakis fled from the forts and hid inland. The Ottomans returned to their base in Tripoli.

== Prelude ==
The failed Orlov Revolt had been a disaster for Mani and in 1770, the Ottoman pasha of the Peloponnese, Hassan Ghazi, invaded Mani with a large force of Ottoman Albanians. Their army laid siege to the Grigorakis tower in Skoutari which was garrisoned by fifteen men. The tower held out for three days until it was undermined and gunpowder was placed underneath the tower, which was set alight and blown up.

The Ottomans advanced to the plain of Vromopidaga where they defeated the vastly outnumbered Maniots. Ghazi lured the Maniots' leader Exarchos and had him hung. His mother then had the men of Skoutari under Grigorakis trick the Turkish garrison at Passavas and sacked the city.

In 1784, Grigorakis was lured onto an Ottoman ship and was given the choice of his life or to accept the title of bey and Ottoman vassalage. For four years since the last Ottoman invasion, Grigorakis had refused offers to become bey but under the pressure of this threat he accepted. But in 1798 he was caught conspiring with French agents. He was disposed and outlawed but he continued to cause trouble for the Ottomans from his tower house at Marathonisi. In 1803, a load of French weapons was delivered to his fort. Once the Ottomans found out, they decided it was time to stop Grigorakis.

== The Invasion ==
After he was delivered the weapons, Grigorakis prepared his fort for a siege. The Kapudan Pasha advanced with a large force of Turco-Albanians into Mani and set up camp at Gytheio which was opposite Marathonisi. Grigorakis with his sons and loyal supporters was well equipped with the French weapons and could withstand a short siege. The Ottoman fleet blockaded the island and the Ottoman artillery caused severe damage to Grigorakis's cause. After a while Grigorakis slipped out of the fort during the night and fled inland. With Grigorakis gone the Ottomans abandoned the siege.

== Aftermath ==
Grigorakis's death came in 1808, while he was organising more raids into Ottoman territory. Antonobey Grigorakis became bey in 1802 and in 1807 his reluctance to deal with his cousin Tzanetos caused another Ottoman invasion. The Ottomans also tried to invaded Mani in 1815 but were repulsed. The Ottoman control over the rest of Greece ended in 1821 when the Greeks declared their independence.

== Sources ==
- Peter Greenhalgh and Edward Eliopoulos. Deep into Mani: Journey to the Southern Tip of Greece. ISBN 0-571-13524-2
