= Parasyros =

Parasyros Παρασυρός
- Settlement
- Location within Greece
- Coordinates: 36°40′N 22°28.9′E
- Country: Greece
- Administrative region: Peloponnese
- Regional unit: Laconia
- Municipality: East Mani
- Municipal unit: Gytheio
- Community: Skoutari
- Elevation: 160 m (520 ft)

Population (2021)
  - Total: 83
- Time zone: UTC+2 (EET)
  - Summer (DST): UTC+3 (EEST)
- Postal code: 232 00
- Area code: 02733
- Vehicle registration: AK

Parasyros (Greek: Παρασυρός) is a southern Greek village of the municipality of East Mani on the Mani Peninsula. Before the 2011 local government reform it was a part of the municipality of Gytheio. Parasyros is part of the community of Skoutari. Parasyros is located 2 km west of Skoutari, 9 km east of Areopoli and 13 km southwest of Gytheio.

== Historical population ==
Year	Population
1830	50-100
1896	188
1961	187
1991	54
2001	82
2011	59
2021	83

== History ==
In 1770 Parasyros sent men to contribute to the Maniot army in the Battle of Vromopigada. The Maniot army assembled in the mountains behind Parasyros called tria kefalia (Three Heads). In the battle that ensued the Maniot army defeated a much superior Ottoman army. It was part of the municipality Karyoupoli between 1845 and 1912, part of the community Skoutari between 1912 and 1997, and part of the municipality Gytheio between 1997 and 2010. Parasyros was occupied by the Nazis in World War II.

== See also ==
- List of settlements in Laconia
