= Skoutari, Laconia =

Skoutari Σκουτάρι
- Community
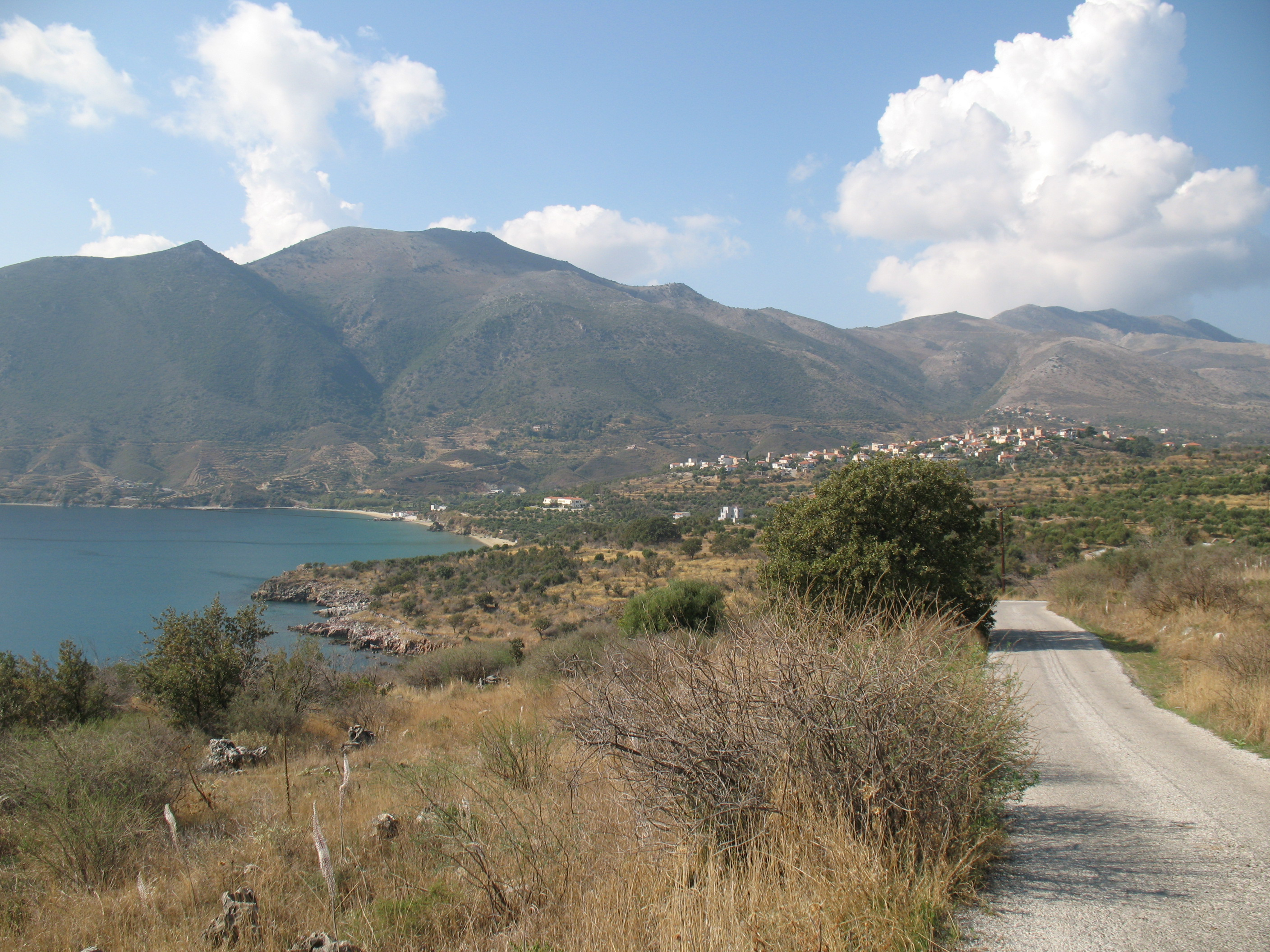

- Location within Greece
- Coordinates: 36°40.1′N 22°30′E
- Country: Greece
- Administrative region: Peloponnese
- Regional unit: Laconia
- Municipality: East Mani
- Municipal unit: Gytheio
- Village established: 1453

Area
  - Community: 11.667 km^{2} (4.505 sq mi)
- Elevation: 98 m (322 ft)

Population (2021)
  - Community: 327
  - Density: 28.0/km^{2} (72.6/sq mi)
- Time zone: UTC+2 (EET)
  - Summer (DST): UTC+3 (EEST)
- Postal code: 232 00
- Area code: +30-2733
- Vehicle registration: ΑΚ

Skoutari (Greek: Σκουτάρι) is a village and a community of the municipality of East Mani. Before the 2011 local government reform it was a part of the municipality of Gytheio, of which it was a municipal district. The community of Skoutari covers an area of 11.667 km^{2}. According to local tradition it was founded by refugees from the Fall of Constantinople in 1453.

== History ==
=== Ancient Town ===
In the Mycenaean period of Greece, there was thought to be a town called Vorthona which is now submerged. In Ancient Greece, the town used to be called Asine. The town was under Spartan control. In 218 BC, the inhabitants of Asine defeated the army of Philip V of Macedon who was besieging the town. During the Roman period it belong to Sparta ever though most of the other towns in the area were part of the Union of Free Laconians.

=== Modern Town ===
The modern town of Skoutari was founded in 1453 AD by refugees from the namesake district of Constantinople who fled from the Ottomans during the Fall of Constantinople. While the rest of Greece fell to the Ottoman Turks, Mani remained free. In the 17th and 18th centuries, Skoutari became a haven for pirates which rivalled Oitylo. The Ottomans tried to conquer Mani in 1770 and they laid siege to the tower of the Grigorakis clan which was one of the most powerful in Mani and whose base was Skoutari and they blew it up with gunpowder after a three-day siege. The Ottoman army was later defeated in the Battle of Vromopigada in the plain outside Skoutari and repelled from Mani. The Ottomans tried to capture Skoutari again in 1815 but they were defeated and driven back. In 1832, Greece was recognized as an independent state and Skoutari became part of it. During World War II, Greece was invaded by the Germans and Italians who captured Skoutari.

=== Recent history ===
Now Skoutari is a peaceful sea town with around 150 residents during summer. Skoutari was struck by forest fire in July 2007.

== Geography ==
Skoutari was built on a hill around 50 metres above the sea level. Skoutari is linked by a road linking Cape Tenaro and Gythio encircling the eastern half of the peninsula. Farmlands are in the valleys, the mountains dominate most of the area and forests covers the valley areas especially around the village, the rest of the land are made up of rocks, bushes and grasslands. The Skoutari Bay lies directly to the east and are surrounded by bluffs, rocks and treacherous landscapes.

=== Nearest places ===
- Kotronas, south
- Kalyvia, east

== Administrative division ==
The community of Skoutari consists of two separate settlements:

- Parasyros (population 83 as of 2021)
- Skoutari (population 244)

== Historical population ==
Year	Population
1830	700-1,000
1910	700-1,000
1981	218
1991	207
2001	215
2011	293
2021	327

== See also ==
- List of settlements in Laconia
