= Mixed Commission for the Exchange of Greek and Turkish Populations =

International body established in 1923

The Mixed Commission for the Exchange of Greek and Turkish Populations was an international body established under the 1923 Treaty of Lausanne to oversee the compulsory population exchange between Greece and Turkey following World War I. The commission was responsible for managing the logistics, resolving disputes, and ensuring the implementation of the exchange's terms, which involved the relocation of over 1.5 million people based on their religious identity.

== Background ==
The Treaty of Lausanne, signed on July 24, 1923, ended hostilities between the Allied Powers and the Ottoman Empire and laid the foundation for the modern Republic of Turkey. One of its most controversial provisions was the compulsory population exchange between Greece and Turkey, which aimed to address ethnic tensions by forcibly relocating Greek Orthodox Christians from Turkey to Greece and Muslims from Greece to Turkey.

This exchange marked one of the largest forced migrations in modern history, intended to create ethnically homogeneous states. However, it led to significant challenges, including humanitarian crises, property disputes, and social dislocation. To manage these complexities, the Treaty established the Mixed Commission as an international oversight mechanism.

== Structure and composition ==
The Mixed Commission consisted of members appointed by Greece, Turkey, and the League of Nations, reflecting its international mandate.^{[3]} It operated as an impartial body tasked with ensuring fair implementation of the population exchange and addressing disputes between the two nations.

=== Key roles ===
- Property valuation and compensation: Assessing the value of properties abandoned by displaced populations and determining compensation mechanisms.
- Arbitration of disputes: Acting as a mediator in disagreements related to the exchange process.
- Logistical oversight: Organizing transportation, housing, and the allocation of resources for displaced populations.

=== Leadership ===
The commission was led by a neutral president, often a legal expert appointed by the League of Nations, to ensure impartiality in decision-making. This leadership structure was designed to build trust between the Greek and Turkish governments.

== Functions ==
Primary responsibilities of the Mixed Commission included:

- Managing the relocation process: Ensuring that individuals subject to the exchange were safely relocated and provided with basic necessities during the transition.
- Resolving property disputes: Addressing claims related to land, homes, businesses, and other assets left behind by the displaced populations.
- Providing arbitration: Acting as an arbiter for conflicts arising between the Greek and Turkish governments over the interpretation of the exchange agreement.
- Facilitating Financial Compensation: Establishing mechanisms to compensate individuals for lost property and resolving disagreements over property valuation.

== Challenges ==
The Mixed Commission faced significant difficulties in carrying out its mandate, including:

- Humanitarian crises: The scale of the exchange overwhelmed local and international resources, leading to overcrowded refugee camps, food shortages, and health crises.
- Cultural and emotional displacement: Many individuals resisted relocation, as they were deeply connected to their ancestral lands and communities.
- Property and asset disputes: Determining the value of abandoned properties and arranging compensation proved contentious, with both governments asserting competing claims.
- Political tensions: Persistent mistrust between Greece and Turkey often hampered the commission's work and delayed resolution of key issues.

== Legacy and impact ==
The Mixed Commission played a critical role in implementing the terms of the Lausanne Treaty, though its efforts were not without controversy. While it succeeded in overseeing the relocation of populations, the human and cultural costs of the exchange have been widely debated. The commission's work is regarded as a significant early example of international conflict management and arbitration.

=== Influence on international law ===
The commission's activities set a precedent for the establishment of similar bodies to manage forced migrations and address disputes over population transfers. Its legacy is often cited in discussions of international law concerning refugees, property restitution, and post-conflict reconciliation.

== See also ==
- Interpretation of the Greco-Turkish Agreement
