= Ottoman invasion of Mani (1807) =

1807 Ottoman Invasion of Mani
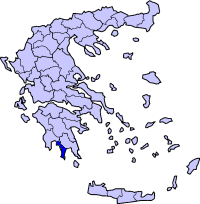
- Map of Greece with Mani highlighted.
Date	1807
Location	Mani, Greece
Result	Greek victory
Territorial changes	None

Belligerents
Mani	Ottoman Empire

Commanders and leaders
Antonobey Grigorakis	Kapudan Pasha

The 1807 Ottoman Invasion of Mani was one of a series of invasions by the Ottomans to subdue the Maniots. Mani was the only region of Greece that the Ottomans had not occupied due to the rough terrain and the rebellious spirit of the Maniots. The Maniots caused damage to the Ottomans by allying with the Venetians whenever there was a war between Venice and the Ottomans; they also were pirates.

When Antonobey Grigorakis was named Bey of Mani, his renowned cousin Zanetos Grigorakis was raiding Ottoman territories in Laconia after having fled from Marathonisi in 1803. Antony's reluctance to deal with his cousin caused the Ottomans to invaded Mani and besiege Antonobey in his tower house in Marathonisi. The invasion force was larger than the previous one and it caused much damage to the surrounding land.

== Prelude ==
The Ottomans had tried to take over Mani in 1770. In this attempt the Ottomans laid siege to the Grigorakis tower in Skoutari which was garrisoned by fifteen men and was eventually destroyed after three days. The Ottoman army then advanced to the plain of 'Vromopigada' where they were caught by surprise by the Maniots who they outnumbered and were routed. But the Maniot leader Exarchos who was Zanetos's nephew and Antony's father was lured to Tripoli and hung. His mother then caused the men of Skoutari under Zanetos to sack the Ottoman castle of Passavas by trickery.

Zanetos, who became bey of Mani in 1784, was caught conspiring with the French under Napoleon against the Ottomans in 1798 and was deposed and outlawed by the Ottomans. But when he received a shipment of French weapons in 1803, the Kapudan Pasha invaded Mani and laid siege to Zanetos in Marathonisi. After a while, Zanetos slipped away from the siege during the night and retreated to inland Mani.

== The Invasion ==
Antony's reluctance to deal with his cousin was either because he was unwilling or that he was incapable of achieving the task. His reluctance to deal with his cousin greatly angered the Kapudan Pasha because he was causing much damage to Ottoman lands in Laconia and Messenia. To teach Antony a lesson the Kapudan Pasha descended upon Gytheio with a larger force of Ottoman Albanians than in 1803 and ravaged the surrounding country. He then started besieging Antonobey in his fort on Marathonisi. Like the last time he blockaded Marathonisi from the sea with his fleet and bombarded the fort with his artillery. But Antonobey and his Maniots continued to fight bravely and they managed to hold off the Ottomans long enough for them to abandon the siege.

== Aftermath ==
Antonobey continued to hold the position of bey until he resigned in favour of his son-in-law, Konstantis Zervakos, who was on good terms with the Ottomans. In 1815, the Ottomans once again tried to conquer Mani by landing an army at Skoutari which was the Grigorakis' home town. The attack was repulsed by Theodoros Grigorakis. In 1821, the rest of Greece declared its independence.

== Sources ==
- Peter Greenhalgh and Edward Eliopoulos. Deep into Mani: Journey to the Southern Tip of Greece. ISBN 0-571-13524-2
