= Ottoman invasion of Mani (1815) =

1815 Ottoman Invasion of Mani
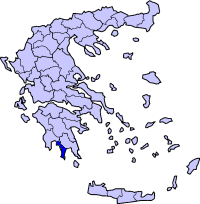
- Map of Greece with Mani highlighted.
Date	1815
Location	Skoutari, Mani, Greece
Result	Maniot victory
Territorial changes	None

Belligerents
Mani	Ottoman Empire

Commanders and leaders
Theodoros Grigorakis	Kapudan Pasha

Casualties and losses
30 dead	115 dead

The 1815 Ottoman Invasion of Mani was one of a series of invasions by the Ottomans to subdue the Maniots. Mani was the only region of Greece that the Ottomans had not occupied due to the rough terrain and the rebellious spirit of the Maniots. The Maniots caused damage to the Ottomans by allying with the Venetians whenever there was a war between Venice and the Ottomans. They also practiced piracy.

The Ottomans had invaded Mani twice in the fifteen years prior to the 1815 invasion, and had dealt with the powerful Grigorakis clan, but now they decided to invade the Grigorakis' home town of Skoutari. The Ottomans under the Kapudan Pasha gathered a small fleet and invaded Mani. Once they landed the Skoutariotes under Theodoros Grigorakis attacked them and drove them into the sea.

== Prelude ==
Even though the Grigorakis clan's power had weakened they still caused the Ottomans pain and they still had considerable power amongst the Maniots as the bey of Mani was a Grigorakis. The Kapudan Pasha decided that he had to deliver the hammer blow to the Grigorakis. He planned to invade the Grigorakis' home town of Skoutari, which was a haven for Maniot pirates and was the second most renowned pirate haven in Mani after Oitylo. The Kapudan Pasha knew that if he destroyed Skoutari, he would also destroy piracy in that region of Mani. He then gathered a small fleet and a force of Muslim Albanians and proceeded to Skoutari.

== The battle ==
The Skoutariotes had no advance warning of the invasion, until the Ottoman fleet was seen in Skoutari Bay. All of the men in the town gathered their weapons and under the command of Theodoros Grigorakis they went to the beach where the Ottomans were landing. As the Ottomans were landing, the Skoutariotes fell upon them and drove them back into the sea. The defeated Ottomans retreated to their ships and sailed back to their bases. During the battle, the Ottomans lost 115 men while the Skoutariotes lost only 30 men.

== Aftermath ==
This was the last time the Ottomans invaded Mani. In 1821, the rest of Greece declared its independence. During the war, Egyptians under Ibrahim Pasha invaded Mani, but were repelled by the Maniots under Petros Mavromichalis at the Battle of Vergas.

== Sources ==
- Peter Greenhalgh and Edward Eliopoulos. Deep into Mani: Journey to the Southern Tip of Greece. ISBN 0-571-13524-2
