= Hasanlu Lovers =

Human archaeological remains found in Iran

- Born: Birth names unknown Teppe Hasanlu – Iran
- Died: Around 800 BCE; Teppe Hasanlu – Iran
- Other name: 'Hasanlu Lovers'
- Known for: Excavated from the Hasanlu archaeological site by a team from Pennsylvania Museum led by Director Robert H. Dyson Jr in 1972
- Notable work: The lovers were on display at the Penn Museum from the mid-1970s until the mid-1980s.

The Hasanlu Lovers are a pair of human remains found at the Teppe Hasanlu archaeological site, located in the Naqadeh in the West Azerbaijan Province of Iran. Around 800 BCE, the city of Hasanlu, located in north-western Iran, was destroyed by an unknown invader. Inhabitants were slain and left where they fell. In 1972, the skeletons were discovered by a team of archaeologists from the University of Pennsylvania led by Robert H. Dyson.

The two human skeletons were found together in a bin during excavations, seemingly embracing at the time of death, with no other objects except a stone slab under the head of one skeleton. They died together around 800 BCE, during the last destruction of Hasanlu. Approximately 246 skeletons were found at the site. How the lovers died and ended up in the bin is still under speculation but both skeletons lack evidence of injury near the time of death and possibly died of asphyxiation. They were exhibited at the Penn Museum from 1974 until the mid-1980s.

The right skeleton, referred to as HAS 73-5-799 (SK 335), is lying on its back, and the left skeleton, referred to as HAS 73-5-800 (SK 336), is lying on its left side facing SK 335. When excavated, the skeletons were tested to determine various characteristics. Dental evidence suggests SK 335 was a young adult, possibly 19–22 years of age. Researchers identified the skeleton as male largely based on the pelvis. The skeleton had no apparent evidence of disease or healed lifetime injuries. Skeleton SK 336 appeared to have been healthy in life; the skeleton had no apparent evidence of healed lifetime injuries, and was estimated to have been about 30–35 years of age. Sex determination of the left skeleton was less definitive. Recent evidence has confirmed SK 336 is male after being originally identified as female. The skeletons have been a subject of debate since they were first excavated.

== Archaeological record of Hasanlu ==
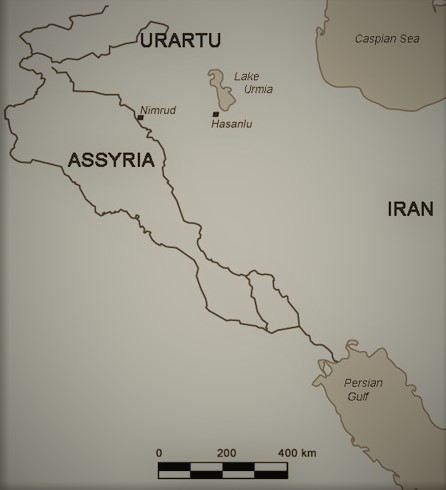
Map of Ancient Near East including Hasanlu

Hasanlu is an ancient Near Eastern site located in the Qadar River valley, on the southern shore of Lake Urmia in northwest Iran. The city was occupied consistently from the sixth millennium BCE to around 800 BCE, when the site was invaded and destroyed by fire. In 1934–1936 Hasanlu was commercially dug by Sir Aurel Stein, a British archaeologist. Then, in 1956, the Hasanlu Project was launched under the sponsorship of the University of Pennsylvania Museum of Archaeology and Anthropology, the Metropolitan Museum of Art, and the Archaeological Service of Iran. Following the launch of the Hasanlu Project, a team of archaeologists from Penn Museum led by Director Robert H. Dyson excavated the site from 1957 to 1974. This team completed nine excavation campaigns, and the excavation of the site ended more than 40 years ago (as of 2022).

Excavation of the site revealed burnt remains of huge mudbrick walls, thick layers of ash, skeletons, vessels, jewelry, and more. Excavation exposed extensive destruction – evidence of the city's invasion and arson. Archaeologists explain that the nature of the destruction resulted in the city being essentially frozen in time, preserving buildings, artefacts, and skeletal remains. Approximately 246 skeletons, of a variety of ages and genders were found. The bodies were left where they were killed in the streets and in buildings. Some victims were found in groups, with head lacerations and dismembered limbs, which suggested mass executions had taken place. Among the 246 skeletons found, two of them were the remains of the Hasanlu Lovers.

Who attacked Hasanlu is still unknown; the general academic consensus is that the Urartians were the invaders, but the Assyrian Empire was also prominent in the region. There is no indication from the skeletons themselves or from the artefacts exactly who the invaders were. The city itself is considered protohistoric: there was no writing around the site, unlike sites in neighboring regions. Because of this, archaeologists do not know how the people of Hasanlu would have identified themselves, who they were, or the language they would have spoken. The original name of the city is unknown.

== Rediscovery and excavation ==
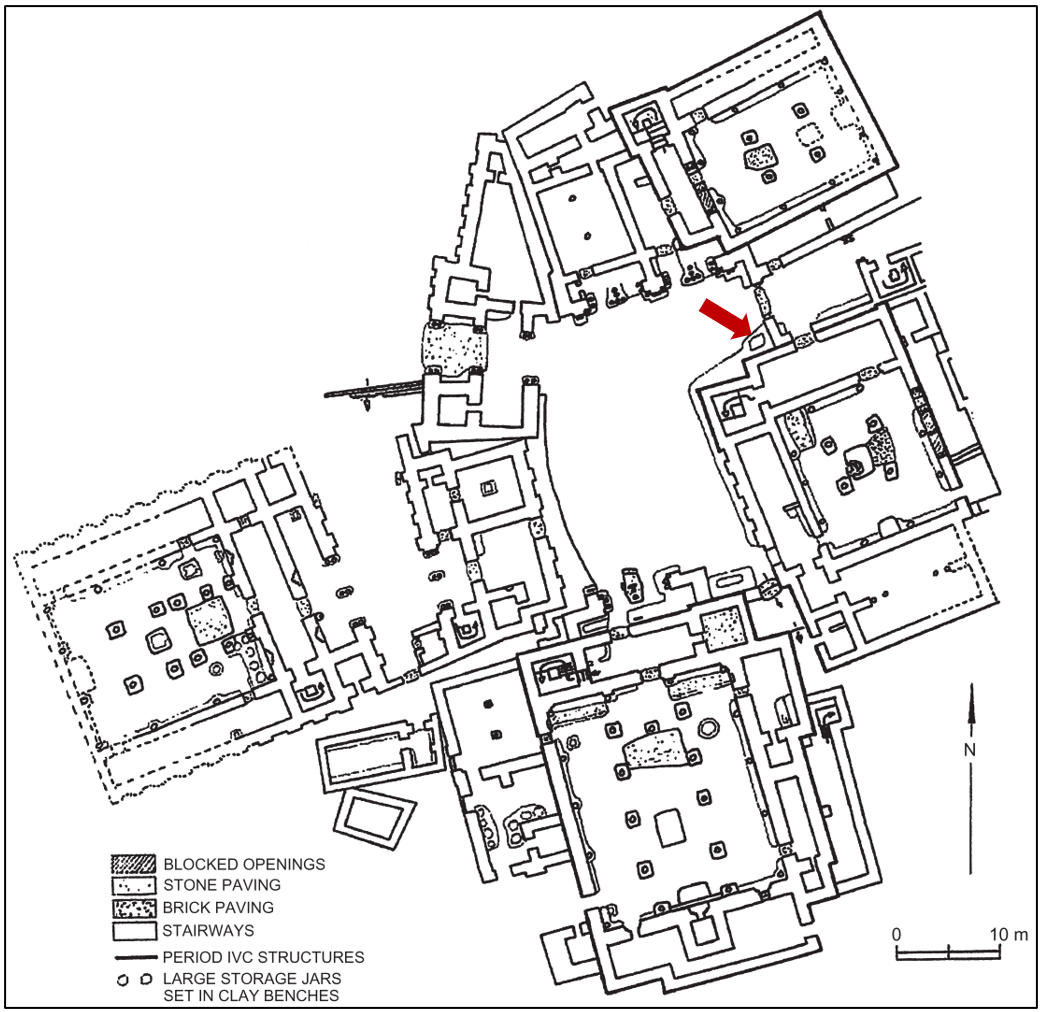
Archaeological Site of Hasanlu: Figure 23.2. (Adapted) Plan of Hasanlu with the Hasanlu Lovers indicated by an arrow.

The skeletal remains of the Hasanlu Lovers were found together in a plaster-lined brick bin with no other objects except a stone slab under the head of one skeleton. The excavation took place in 1972, directed by Robert H. Dyson, Jr. Dr. Selinsky stated that the lovers perished together during the invasion of the site, around 800 BCE, during the last destruction of the Hasanlu, but did not have any lethal wounds. Archaeologist Oscar White Muscarella suggests that the hole in the right skeleton's skull is not due to an injury, but the result of a blow created by a workman's pickaxe. When discovered, the two skeletons were facing and embracing each other. The skeleton on the left is lying on its left side, reaching with its right hand towards the skeleton on the right.

There is no definitive explanation as to how the two skeletons ended up in the bin – only assumptions. One assumption is that "they must have crawled into this bin, which was probably covered at the time, and escaped detection." Since cause of death was not due to injury, archaeologists have concluded that the probable cause of death was asphyxiation, when debris fell from the burning building, and sealed them in.

== Scientific analysis ==
Anthropologists Page Selinsky and Janet Monge go into extensive detail about the DNA testing of the Hasanlu lovers and how the DNA testing compares to the skeletal assessment of their biological sex.

The 'lovers' were first sampled for specific isotopes to see if there were any differences in the skeletal series and the diets that they consumed. What the isotopic testing revealed was that the diets of the individuals were quite varied, but they were not patterned in any particular way. Isotopic signatures indicate that the diets of the residents of Hasanlu were varied, including wheat, barley, sheep and goats. Isotopic signatures coming from oxygen revealed the individuals' settlement patterns; these oxygen isotopic signatures revealed that the 'lovers', and the other Hasanlu people, were all born and raised in the Hasanlu area.

It was concluded by Selinsky and Monge that both individuals were male. They came to this conclusion when comparing both the DNA analysis and skeletal assessment. Dr Selinsky stated that the pelvis was the single best criterion for estimating the sex of the skeletons as there are distinctive features between a female and a male pelvis.

The skeleton on the right (referred to as SK 335) is lying on its back. The front portion of his pelvis was lost but when examining his sciatic notch, it was evident he was a male due to the very narrow gap which is a distinctive feature of the male pelvis. As such, researchers identified the skeleton as male largely based on the pelvis. The skeleton had no apparent evidence of disease or healed lifetime injuries.

For the left skeleton (SK 336), lying on its left side facing SK 335, the sex estimation was less clear, but overall research suggests a male: the cranium is distinctively male, while the pelvis is more mixed in its morphology. At the time of excavation, this skeleton was originally identified as female. This was because his sciatic notch was quite wide, a characteristic of a female pelvis, but the front portion of his pelvis which was retrieved from the site, had an acute angle in the front and was less pulled out than a female's, which suggested the skeleton was a male. The individual appeared to have been healthy in life, and the skeleton had no apparent evidence of healed lifetime injuries. The sex of the 'lovers' was confirmed from a bone sample for an ancient DNA analysis. The genetic determination of the Hasanlu lovers was male.

The age of the two skeletons was also determined. Dental evidence suggests that the right skeleton was a young adult or subadult, estimated to be aged 19–22 years old, as he has third molars, and his wisdom teeth recently grew. His skull was less developed, which was attributable to the young age of the individual. The left skeleton was estimated to be an older adult 30–35 years old; his skull had fully developed, and the cranium was distinctively male.

== Controversy ==
Some researchers decry the sensationalism surrounding the Hasanlu Lovers as an example of non-Heteronormativity. The two skeletons received their sobriquet 'Hasanlu Lovers' due to the intimate position they were found in. Before the skeletons were subjected to DNA analysis one skeleton was thought to be male and the other female. Oscar Muscarella, who was co-director of excavations at Hasanlu in the 1960s, states, "I knew at first sight who was the female," in reference to the two skeletons. However, the team from the University of Pennsylvania assessed that the right skeleton was likely male due to its morphology. The left skeleton had less clear osteological indicators, but was later identified to be male through DNA analysis. Limitations of osteological sex assessments as noted by one author is that there are many times when the biological sex can not be certain, and that these tests do not reveal anything about the culturally-constructed gender.

Reasons for expecting the skeletons to be a heteronormative couple, as Killgrove and Geller explain, are because modern society is primed by culture to see this representation. Geller states that projecting contemporary assumptions about sex, gender, and sexuality onto the past can be problematic, and that the true relationship between the two skeletons is unknown and remains up to speculation, despite the implications that may be drawn from their seemingly intimate pose.

== See also ==
- Embracing Skeletons of Alepotrypa
- Lovers of Valdaro
- Lovers of Cluj-Napoca
- Lovers of Modena
- Lovers of Teruel
