= Asphaleius =

Epithet for the Greek god Poseidon

Asphaleius or Asphalius (Ancient Greek: Ἀσφάλειος or Ancient Greek: Ἀσφάλιος) was a cultic epithet of the Greek god Poseidon, under which he was worshipped in several towns of ancient Greece and across the wider Greek world. His Greek name may also be transliterated as Asphaleus, Asphaleios, or Asphalios.

== Name ==
In Greek, asphaleia means "safety", or an absence of instability. This epithet broadly describes him in a protector role, as the god who grants safety to ports and in sea navigation in general, a "guardian of the harbour".

In this aspect he was also a "bringer of stability", both in the personal sense, as a cane or walking stick might make an old man more stable, as well as in a more concrete sense, as in the stability of war fortifications. The Erythraeans regularly sacrificed to Poseidon Asphaleius to protect the city's walls, as did the Colophonians when in the 4th century BCE they built new fortifications for their town. Archaeologists have uncovered ancient inscriptions which urge townspeople to sacrifice to Poseidon Asphaleius in the aftermath of an earthquake, to bring stability back to their town.

== Sites ==
Cults dedicated to Poseidon Asphaleius are known to have been in active in ancient Taenarum, Kalaureia, and Sparta,

There are ruins of an altar to Poseidon Asphaleius on Aigai. The Temple of Poseidon at Tainaron—modern Cape Matapan on the Mani Peninsula of the southern Peloponnese—was dedicated to Poseidon Asphaleius.
