= Lovers of Valdaro =

Pair of human skeletons found near Mantua, Italy, in 2007

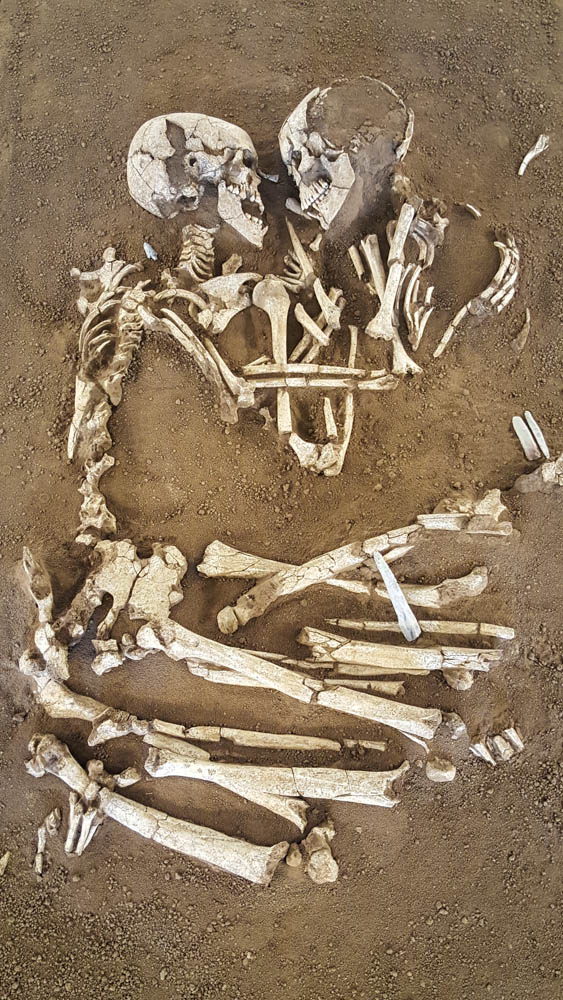
The Lovers of Valdaro at the National Archaeological Museum of Mantua, Italy. The male skeleton is on the left, and the female skeleton is on the right.

The Lovers of Valdaro, or Valdaro Lovers (Italian: Amanti di Valdaro), are a pair of human skeletons believed to be approximately 6,000 years old. They were discovered by archaeologists at a Neolithic tomb in San Giorgio near Mantua, Italy, in 2007. The two individuals were buried face to face with their arms around each other, in a position reminiscent of a "lovers' embrace".

Archaeologist Elena Maria Menotti led the excavation. The pair are a male and female no older than twenty years old at death and approximately 1.57 m (5 ft 2 in) in height. The male skeleton was found with a flint arrowhead near the neck. The female had a long flint blade along the thigh, plus two flint knives under the pelvis. Osteological examination found no evidence of violent death, no fractures, and no microtrauma, so the most likely explanation is the flint tools were buried along with the people as grave goods.

The skeletons were displayed briefly in public for the first time in September 2011 at the National Archaeological Museum of Mantua, thanks to the effort of the association Lovers in Mantua which was seeking a permanent home for the ancient couple.

Seven years after their discovery, on 11 April 2014, they were permanently displayed inside a glass case in the museum, which is within the perimeter of the Ducal palace of Mantua.

== See also ==
- Embracing Skeletons of Alepotrypa
- Hasanlu Lovers
- List of unsolved deaths
- Lovers of Cluj-Napoca
- Lovers of Modena
- Lovers of Teruel
