= Khnumhotep and Niankhkhnum =

Ancient Egyptian royal servants

Coordinates: 29.86795°N 31.219416°E

- Overseer of Manicurists in the Palace
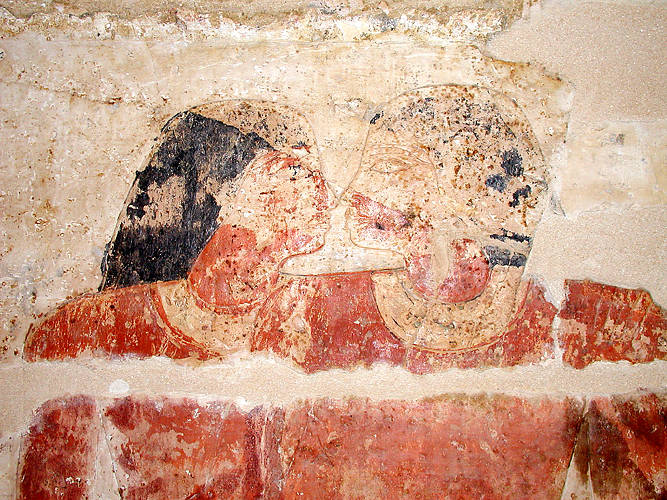
- Khnumhotep and Niankhkhnum depicted nose to nose and embracing in their tomb
- Dynasty: Fifth Dynasty
- Pharaoh: Nyuserre Ini
- Burial: Mastaba of Khnumhotep and Niankhkhnum
- Spouse: Khenut (Khnumhotep); Khentikawes (Niankhkhnum)
- Children: Khnumhotep: Ptahshepses; Ptahneferkhu; Kaizebi; Khnumheswef; Niankhkhnum the younger; Rewedzawes; Niankhkhnum: Hem-re; Qed-unas; Khnumhezewef; Hemet-re; Khewiten-re; Nebet

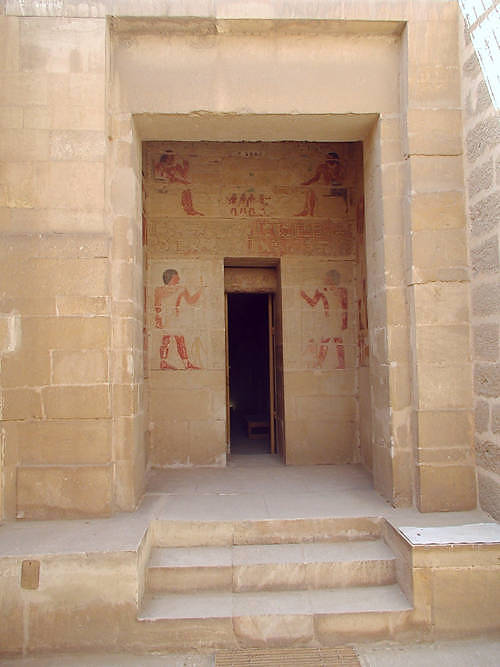
Entrance to second vestibule in the mastaba of Khnumhotep and Niankhkhnum, seen from the enclosed court.

Khnumhotep (Ancient Egyptian: ẖnm.w-ḥtp(.w)) and Niankhkhnum (Ancient Egyptian: nj-ꜥnḫ-ẖnm.w) were two male royal servants from ancient Egypt. The men shared the title of Overseer of the Manicurists in the Palace of King Nyuserre Ini, sixth pharaoh of the Fifth Dynasty, reigning during the second half of the 25th century BC. They were buried together at Saqqara and are listed as "royal confidants" in their joint tomb. They are notable for their unusual depiction in Egyptian records, often interpreted as the first recorded same-sex couple.

== Family ==
Khnumhotep and Niankhkhnum are believed by scholars, including Thomas Dowson, and Greg Reeder, to be the first recorded same-sex couple in ancient history. The assumed romantic relationship between Khnumhotep and Niankhkhnum is based on depictions of the two men standing nose to nose and embracing. Niankhkhnum's wife, depicted in a banquet scene, was almost completely erased in antiquity, and in other pictures Khnumhotep occupies the position usually designated for a wife. Their official titles were "Overseers of the Manicurists of the Palace of the King". Critics argue that both men appear with their respective wives and children, suggesting the men were twin brothers, rather than lovers.

Khnumhotep and Niankhkhnum are depicted in the tomb with their respective families. It has been proposed that they were the sons of Khabaw-khufu and Rewedzawes. They appear to have had three brothers named Titi, Nefernisut, and Kahersetef. Three possible sisters are also attested. They are named Neferhotep-hewetherew, Mehewet and Ptah-heseten. Niankhkhnum's wife was named Khentikawes. The couple appear in the tomb with three sons named Hem-re, Qed-unas and Khnumhezewef, and three daughters, Hemet-re, Khewiten-re and Nebet. At least one grandson is attested, Irin-akheti, the son of Hem-re and his wife, Tjeset.

Khnumhotep had a wife by the name of Khenut. Khnumhotep and Khenut had at least five sons; Ptahshepses, Ptahneferkhu, Kaizebi, Khnumheswef and Niankhkhnum the younger (possibly named after the tomb owner), as well as a daughter named Rewedzawes.

== Careers ==
Khnumhotep and Niankhkhnum were the head manicurists for the royal family, but held a number of different official titles and duties. Both or either men held the following titles: (Note: After registration, must search for pages on Thesaurus Linguae Aegyptiae: Click picture on home page to enter site. Pick "navigating the hierarchical tree of objects and texts" on the database search page. Position of texts in the hierarchical tree is *Thesaurus Linguae Aegyptiae, *Strukturen und Transformationen Berlin-Brandenburgische, *Grabinschriften des Alten Reiches, *Sakkara, *Unas-Friedhof, *Mastaba des Nianch-Chnum und Chnum-hotep. Be sure to click on the nodes themselves, at left on each line.) (Note: Wall texts in Thes. Ling. Aeg. identified by Porter & Moss : Szenen 1.2 and 1.3 [Porter & Moss III, p. 641, I 1(c-d)]; Szene 12 [Porter & Moss III, p. 642, II 8]; Szene 13 [Porter & Moss III, p. 642, II 9]; Szene 15 [Porter & Moss III, p. 642, II 9]; Szene 23 [Porter & Moss III, p. 643, IV 15]; Szene 31 [Porter & Moss III, p. 643, V 20].) (Note: To avoid display problems, the MDC system is used here to transliterate Egyptian words, hence note that A and a are different. The complete set of consonantal "letters" (in lexical order for consulting an Egyptian dictionary) are A, j, y, a, w, b, p, f, m, n, r, h, H, x, X, z, s, S, q, k, g, t, T, d, D, set apart in italics. Other systems exist with special fonts; the A looks like 3 and the a like in books using these. (Wikipedia list here).)

1. m-r jr ant pr aA "overseer of manicurists (literally, 'those who do fingernails') in the palace."
2. sHD jr ant pr aA "inspector of manicurists in the palace"
3. Hrj sStA "guardian of secrets"
4. rx nswt "king's acquaintance"
5. zXAw nswt "king's scribe"
6. mHnk nswt "confidant of the king"
7. jr xt nswt "keeper of the king's things"
8. mrr nb.f "one who is beloved of his lord"
9. Hm-nTr ra m Szp jb ra "sun priest in the (place where the sun-god) Ra's heart receives welcome," that is, in Nyuserre's solar temple at Abu Ghurab
10. wab mn swt nj-wsr-ra "purity attendant of the enduring places of Nyuserre" (a cleaner-priest in this king's pyramid complex at Abusir).
11. wab nswt "one who purifies the king." (a personal priest to the king)
12. nb jmAx nTr aA "lord of those who are honored before the great god" (an aspirational title signifying donations to the individual's mortuary estate from the king).

On duty at the sun temple, Niankhkhnum or Khnumhotep may have watched over subordinate officials, such as the m-r pr Sna "overseer of the magazines" who in turn supervised crews of porters stocking and withdrawing material from the granaries and store-rooms.

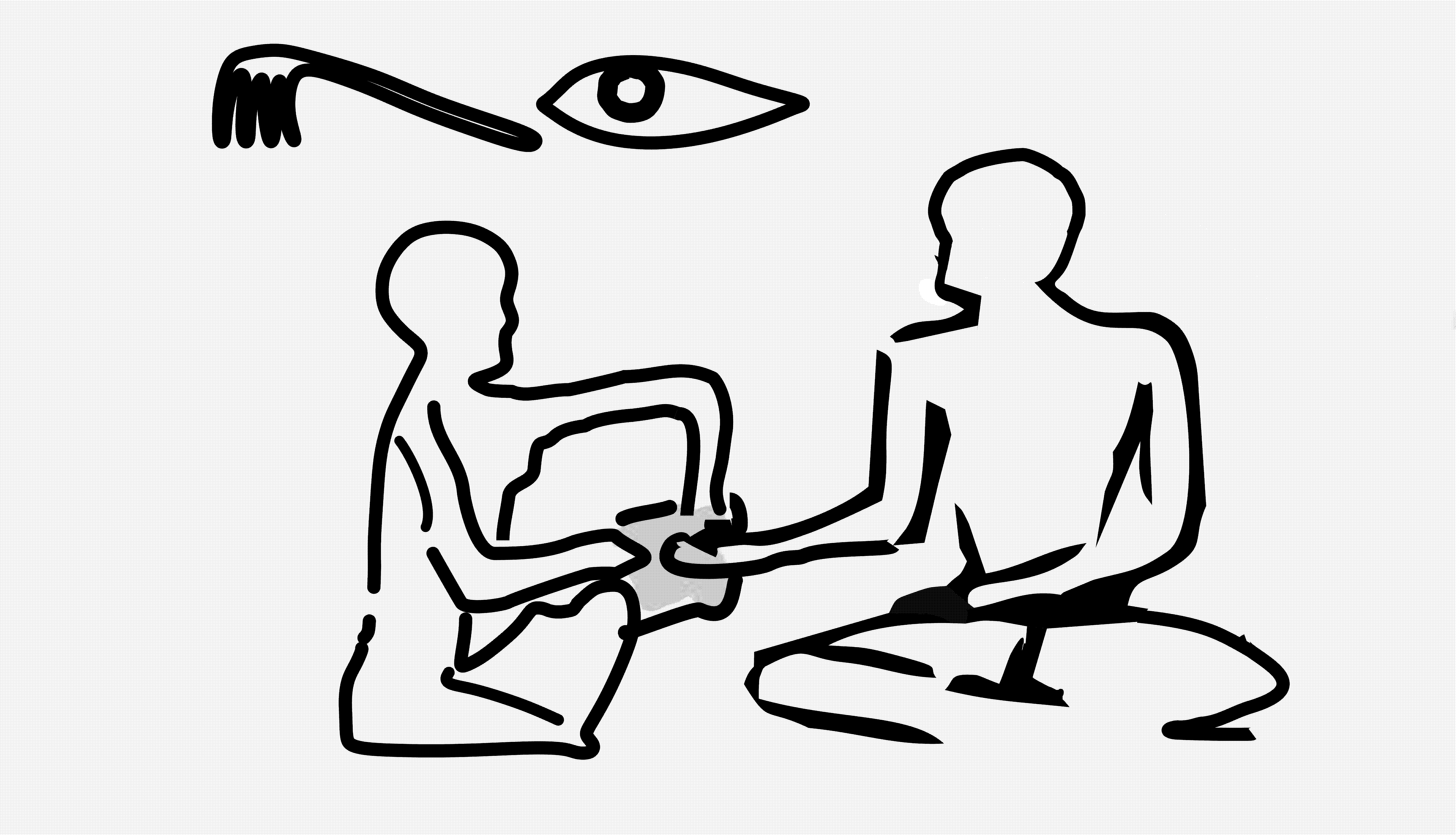
Manicurist at work, Dyn. 5 (reconstruction). He holds tablet for steadying client's hand by pressing it against his knee; trims nails with a flint knife. One is among reliefs in this tomb.

Care of the king's body and wardrobe in preparation for his public appearances required a large number of aides, apparently working in different ateliers each under its own leadership. In addition to the manicurists whom Niankhkhnum and Khnumhotep supervised, the palace had attendants under one or more men holding the title jrj nfr HAt "keeper of the headdress," responsible for the king's wigs and headcloths, jrw Snj " hairdressers, who kept him shaven, and an m-r n jzwj Xkrwt nswt "overseer of the two chambers of king's adorners." The post of Xkrt nswt "adorner of the king" was always held by women, who were legally, if not socially, equal to men in Egypt. Neferhotep-Hathor is labeled with this status at the funeral procession of Niankhkhnum and Khnumhotep.

How, or how often, personnel in the hairdressers' shop, which from titulary evidence stands higher than the manicurists in 5th and 6th Dynasty prestige rankings, communicated with the latter remains unknown. No hairdressers are labeled at the funeral procession. Ptahshepses, the keeper of the headdress who became Nyussere's vizier, and Ti, overseer of the pyramids and sun temples, are two officials whom Niankhkhnum and Khnumhotep may have worked with. Both Khnumhotep and Niankhkhnum are attested on a harvest scene in the splendid burial estate of Ptahshepses, where they may have been quarry supervisors, yet named as jr ant pr aA "palace manicurists," quite junior to titulary in their own tomb, which could mean Ptahshepses died while they were younger. A door jamb, besides TAtj "vizier," displays the title HAt-a "one whose arm is in front," a pure honorific Allen distinguishes from the m-r and jrj titles specifying responsibility domains we've encountered up to now. The jrj nfr HAt "keeper of the headdress" epithet, recorded in many of the rooms, is spelled with the mouth sign (Gardiner D21), not the eye sign (D4), so that it shares the introductory word of jrj-pat "hereditary prince," another of Allen's honorifics.

== Tomb ==
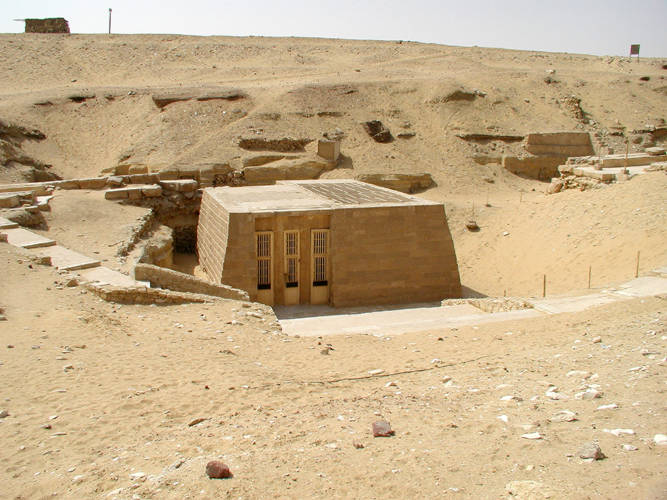
The mastaba of Khnumhotep and Niankhkhnum.

The tomb of Khnumhotep and Niankhkhnum was discovered by Egyptologist Ahmed Moussa in the necropolis at Saqqara, Egypt in 1964, during the excavation of the causeway for the pyramid of King Unas. It is the only tomb in the necropolis where men are displayed embracing and holding hands. In addition, the men's chosen names (both theophorics to the creator-god Khnum) form a linguistic reference to their closeness: Niankhkhnum means "life belongs to Khnum" and Khnumhotep means "Khnum is satisfied;"

The precise king and regnal date of this tomb are unknown; style places it in the latter 5th Dynasty under Nyuserre or Menkauhor. No human remains were discovered inside. It is believed the tomb was built in stages, first a sequence of two chambers cut into the limestone of a low escarpment in the northern area of Saqqara, then a surface-built mastaba structure added to mate with the earlier construction. This would have occurred as the two intended occupants gained resources.

In a banquet scene, Niankhkhnum and Khnumhotep are entertained by dancers, clappers, musicians and singers; in another, they oversee their funeral preparations. In the most striking portrayal, the two embrace, noses touching, in the most intimate pose allowed by canonical Egyptian art, surrounded by what would appear to be their heirs.

== Layout and decoration ==
=== Forecourt entrance with architrave and pillars ===
A two-pillared portico makes up the eastern half of the mastaba's façade. The front is inscribed with Niankhkhnum depicted on the left, Khnumhotep on the right. These two reliefs are virtually identical, only the names being different.

=== Interior of forecourt ===
This space is fairly small. The west side is decorated with a funerary procession for Niankhkhnum and the east side shows a matching funerary procession for Khnumhotep.

Khnumhotep (left) and Niankhknum (right) enjoy taking game in the papyrus marshes that dot Egypt's landscape. See text for discussion; click image to enlarge and view tiny family members dispersed about the men. Osirisnet

The uppermost south wall shows the two men seated before an offering table. Niankhkhnum is seated on the right, while Khnumhotep is seated on the left. The table with offerings stretches out between them. Below the offering scene the two men are depicted netting fowl and fishing. On the left, below this lintel, Khnumhotep stands on a in the boat, spearing fish in the water that floods the bases of papyrus stalks he drifts among. He is accompanied by his wife Khenut, sons and a daughter. On the right, Niankhkhnum is depicted in a similar manner, aiming his throw stick at the waterfowl although the active arm is now missing from this piece.

=== Outer vestibule ===
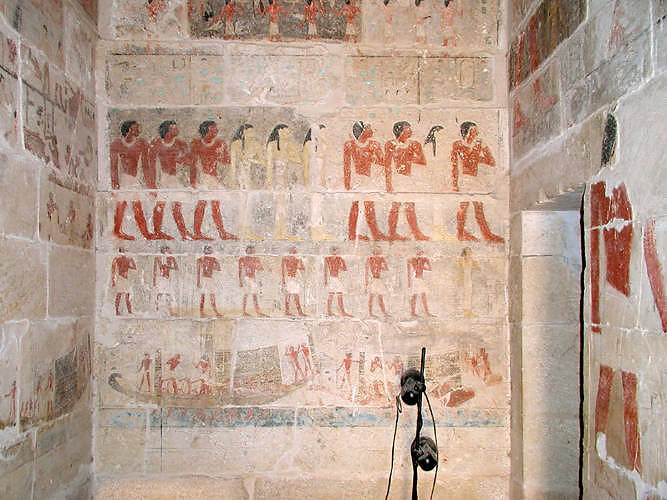
East wall in the first chamber.

At the entrance scenes of baking bread and brewing beer are depicted. Barley is carefully measured out and turned into bread. Other scenes include goat herding, ship building, harvesting scenes, sailing, netting of birds, etc. The east wall contains a legal text. Below this text several people are depicted thought to be the family of the two men. At the very bottom ships are shown. The men are shown standing before the main cabin of the ship.

=== Court (open to sky) ===
An undecorated space which serves to connect the vestibule and chambers on the north end of the mastaba with the abutting rock-cut sections of the tomb to their south. Modern security grates now obstruct much of the full sun that would have flooded this small, walled yard, yet little or no sun fell on the vestibule to the outer rock-cut hall described below, as its entrance faces north.

=== Inner vestibule ===
With names, titles, and standing portraits of the two men, it is much smaller than the other vestibule and without pillars. The lintel's inside surface features another cattle count scene, and each tomb owner appears on one of the side walls with his wife, amid a flow of yet more offerings from the herds.

=== Outer hall ===
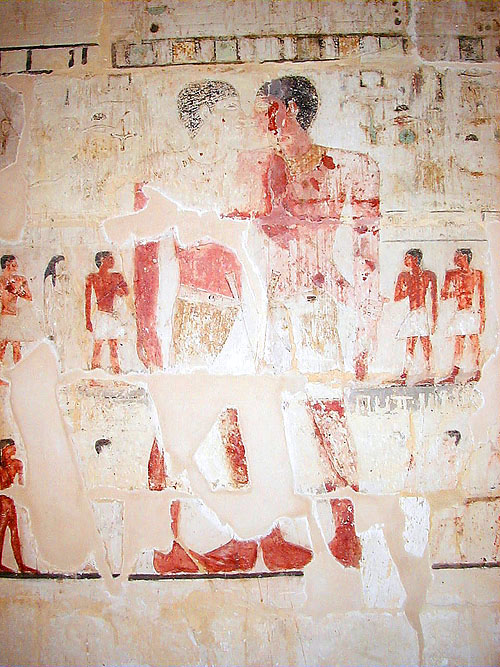
Niankhkhnum (standing, left) and Khnumhotep (right, with his right arm on Niankhkhnum's shoulder), accompanied by their offspring (hieroglyphic notations msw.f). On west wall of outer hall, between double doors.

This outer hall, an antechamber to the final, inner hall, marks the tomb's first, rock-cut phase of construction, and is fully decorated. Before the mastaba was added, it would have been the first room a visitor entered after passing through the forecourt, which was relocated northeast to the far side of the mastaba where it is now. Here, people engage in agricultural occupations including the weighing of corn and grain, the ploughing of fields, and harvesting.

A double doorway to the inner hall is on the west wall, with a broad pillar dividing the doors. Its surface depicts the two men, their children, drawn much smaller to reflect a lesser status, in tow behind each parent. The respective wives do not appear in this scene. Niankhkhnum has three sons and three daughters, Khnumhotep five sons and one daughter, some of whom may be adopted or conceived by a second wife or mistress as they lack the shendyt kilts worn by the others. All the children except Niankhkhnum's youngest son, who still runs naked with his shaved head bearing the single sidelock of youth, are adults despite the scale they are drawn at. Ptahshepses, a son of Khnumhotep, wore the youth sidelock in the marsh scene of the forecourt but not so here. Either inconsistency intrudes, or the art, completed over years, reflects some changes of status which transpire during the tomb's construction.

=== Inner hall ===
Niankhknum and Khnumhotep embracing

Now on the reverse side of the dividing pillar, Niankhknum and Khnumhotep embrace again, and a third time on the opposite wall of this small chamber. They are without their children in this innermost sanctuary. Each man has a "false door," a carved, slot-like niche surrounded by inscriptions which was produced in the royal workshops and installed in the tomb. Niankhknum's is seriously damaged. The false door provided an accessway for the deceased, as a spiritual being, to reach offerings left at the tomb by the living. These offerings were to be set on plinths in front of the false doors. Behind the false doors is a small statue closet known as the serdab. A statue of each man would have been placed here, facing the chamber as if to watch visitors come and go, but invisible to the offering-bringers since the false doors are actually solid. It appears that tomb robbers removed the statues in antiquity; they are no longer extant.

== Deaths and burial ==
The longevity of the owners of the masterba, and the circumstances of their deaths, are unknown. The limestone sarcophagi beneath the mastaba were ransacked long ago, and at some point wooden coffins of a later era no were interred in the burial chambers.

Charlotte Booth, citing others, adheres to the theory that Khnumhotep died first, leaving Niankhkhnum to complete the tomb's art. This conclusion was drawn from Khnumhotep's jmAx epithets (see Titulary section), a style of beard he wore, and exclusion of his wife at the banquet scene when Niankhknum's was originally there. In Reeder's interpretation, absence of Khnumhotep's parents here matching absence of his wife at the banquet, is consistent with Khnumhotep predeceasing his afterlife partner. (Note: All tomb scenes were carved and painted during the prospective occupant's lifetime. Hence they showed an idealization of what was supposed to happen, in terms of mortuary beliefs; they are not records of who was present at a funeral or even of what they did there. From Jones' boats, however, we know that papyriform funeral boats were built and used. An enormous ship of state Khufu buried in a special pit beside his pyramid has been restored and is on display at Giza. There were pits for four more boats, with a boat inside one of these left in situ for future archaeologists. Khufu's boats were made of wood, while the smaller private boats were usually made from bundles of papyrus stalks.).

Uncertain precise relationship connects Niankhkhnum and Khnumhotep as well; Altenmüller considers them brothers, Baines that they were twins, and Reeder that they were same-sex conjugal or domestic partners evidenced by iconography normally used for husband and wife, or, with Khnumhotep, for women (sniffing the lotus blossom).

== See also ==
- Homosexuality in ancient Egypt

== Literature ==
- Ahmed Moussa & Hartwig Altenmüller (1977), Das Grab des Nianchchnum und Chnumhotep. Darmstadt, Germany: Philipp von Zabern. This is the generally accepted publication of the tomb. In German. ISBN 978-3-8053-0050-6
- James Allen (2005), The Ancient Egyptian Pyramid Texts, Series: Writings from the ancient world (23), Peter Der Manuelian (Ed.), Atlanta: Society of Biblical Literature. ISBN 978-1-58983-182-7
- John Baines (2013). High Culture and Experience in Ancient Egypt. Bristol, CT: Equinox. ISBN 978-1-84553-300-7
- Charlotte Booth (2015), In Bed with the Ancient Egyptians, Stroud, UK: Amberley.ISBN 978-1-44-564343-4
- Thomas A. Dowson, "Archaeologists, Feminists, and Queers: sexual politics in the construction of the past". In, Pamela L. Geller, Miranda K. Stockett, Feminist Anthropology: Past, Present, and Future, pp. 89–102. University of Pennsylvania Press 2006, ISBN 0-8122-3940-7
- Linda Evans, Alexandra Woods (2016), Further Evidence that Niankhkhnum and Khnumhotep were Twins // The Journal of Egyptian Archaeology. Vol. 102, Issue 1, pp. 55–72
- Uroš Matić (2018), Out of touch: Egyptology and queer theory (or what this encounter should not be) In: Von der Quelle zur Theorie. Von Verhältnis zwischen Objektivität und Subjektivität in den historischen Wissenschaften, Hrsg. Anne-Sophie Naujoks und Jendrik Stelling. Leiden: Mentis, pp. 183–197.
- Ian Shaw, Editor (2000), The Oxford History of Ancient Egypt, New York:Oxford. ISBN 978-0-19-280458-7
- William K. Simpson (2003) "Three Autobiographies of the Old Kingdom," in W.K. Simpson (Ed.), The Literature of Ancient Egypt. New Haven, CT: Yale University Press, pp. 401–413. ISBN 978-0-300-09920-1
- John Taylor (2001), Death and the Afterlife in Ancient Egypt, Univ. of Chicago Press. ISBN 0-226-79164-5
- Emily Teeter (2011), Religion & Ritual in Ancient Egypt, New York: Cambridge University Press. ISBN 978-0-521-61300-2
- Vera Vasiljević (2008), Embracing his double: Niankhkhnum and Khnumhotep // Studien zur Altägyptischen Kultur. Bd. 37, pp. 363 –372
- Leslie Ann Warden (2013) Pottery and Economy in Old Kingdom Egypt, Boston: Brill. ISBN 978-9-00-425-985-0
- Richard Wilkinson (1994). Symbol and Magic in Egyptian Art, New York: Thames & Hudson. ISBN 0-500-28070-3
