= Tenaris (disambiguation) =

Tenaris may refer to:

- Tenaris, a global manufacturer and supplier of steel pipes
- Tenaris (plant), a plant genus in the Apocynaceae or dogbane family
- Tenaris, a genus of butterflies in the family Nymphalidae; synonym of Taenaris

== See also ==
- Tenarus, a town of ancient Laconia
