= Alepotrypa Cave =

Archaeological site in southern Greece

Caves of Diros
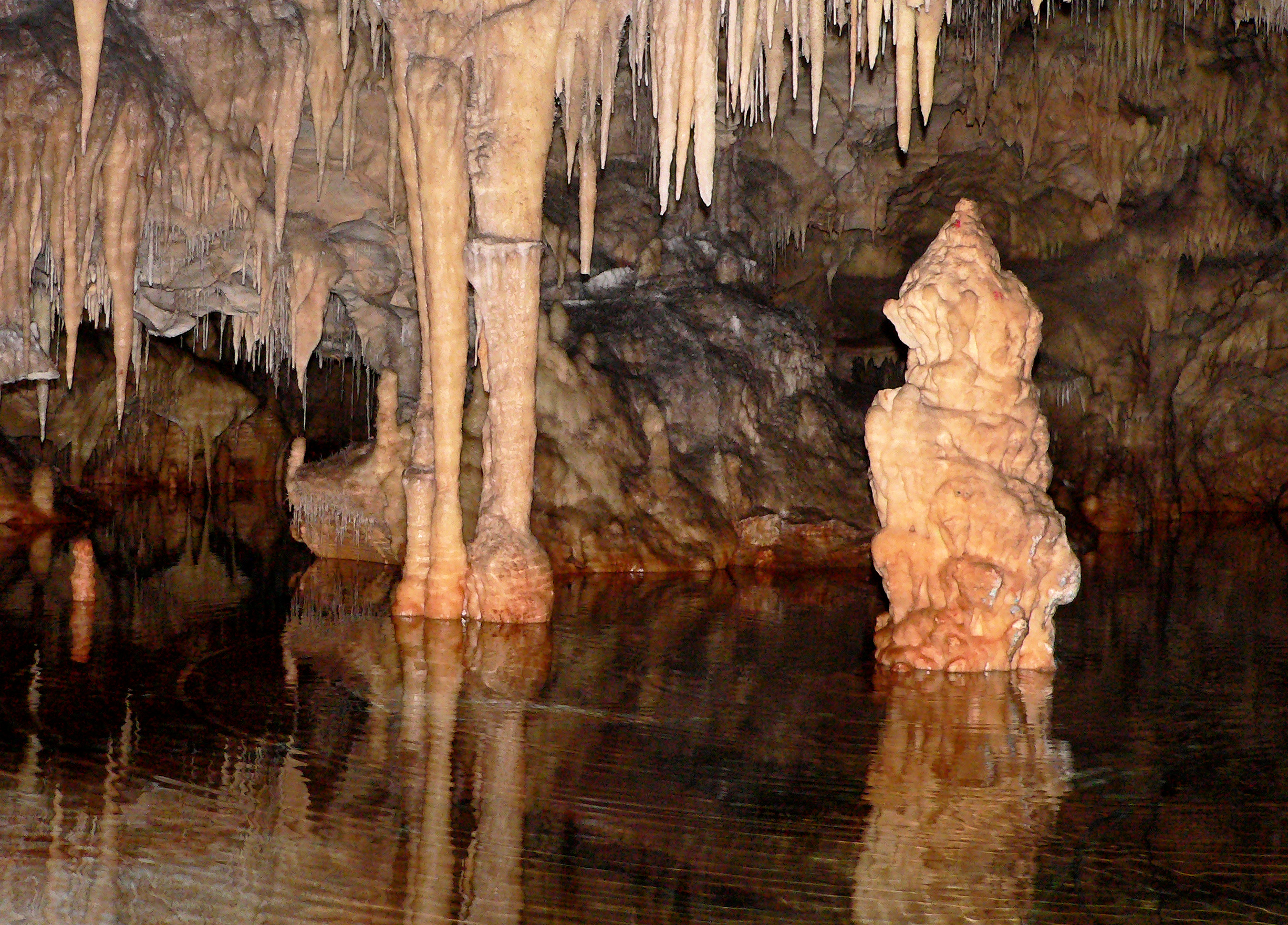
- Distinctive stalagmites and stalactites of the Diros caves
- Interactive map of Caves of Diros
- 36.6380°N 22.3807°E
- Type: habitation, burial, ceremonial
- Periods: Neolithic
- Location: Greece
- Region: Laconia, Peloponnesus

Site notes
- Excavation dates: 1970–2006; 2011–present
- Archaeologists: Giorgos Papathanassopoulos; Anastasia Papathanasiou; William Parkinson; Michael Galaty
- Public access: Yes; ticket needed
- Website: The Diros Project

The Alepotrypa Cave (Greek: Αλεπότρυπα, 'The Fox's Hole') is a Neolithic-period archaeological site on the Mani Peninsula of the Peloponnese in southern Greece. Used for burial and cult purposes, it is one of the largest burial sites ever found in Europe. Two adult human skeletons dubbed "the Embracing Skeletons of Alepotrypa" were found at the site, from a burial dating to the 4th millennium BC; remains from at least 170 separate persons have also been uncovered. The Alepotrypa Cave was also inhabited by early farmers. It is one of the caves of Pyrgos Dirou.

== Excavation history ==
The Alepotrypa Cave site was threatened by private construction work between 1958 and 1970, but the Greek Ministry of Culture cancelled the "touristic exploitation" of the site. Archaeological excavations began in 1970 but were delayed until 1978 due to political complications in Greece. The site was excavated between 1978 and 2005, after which the project was largely put on hold due to lack of funding. In 2010 the Diros Regional Project was founded to conduct a regional survey as the Alepotrypa excavation team began to prepare their findings for publication. Late Neolithic (LN) material has been found in the cave itself, but as of 2013 the survey team has only found material dating to the Final Neolithic (FN) in the nearby open-air areas.

== Geology ==
The Alepotrypa Cave is a karst cave. The Mani peninsula is largely Mesozoic carbonate rocks including limestone. As a result of hydrogeological conditions on the peninsula, the carbonate rocks erode to form karst caves.

The cave is a natural limestone cavity in a dry, rocky landscape, about 20 meters above sea level and 50 meters from the current Mediterranean shoreline. This karstic formation stretches roughly 300 meters in length and 50 meters in width, running east to west. It features multiple corridors and six large chambers (designated A, B, Γ, Δ, Ε and Z, following the Greek alphabet) and ends in a deep lake (Chamber of the Lakes) with slightly brackish but potable water.

== Archaeology ==
Finds from the excavation include Late Neolithic stone, pottery and clay vessels, jewelry and weapons. Painted and incised pottery, shell beads, stone axes, and a complete flint arrowhead have been found, along with blades and flakes of Melian obsidian. Silver jewelry found at the site suggests the area was wealthy, as silver was extremely rare in Bronze Age and Neolithic Europe. A rare early copper axe, which scholars believe can be dated to the Final Neolithic period, was also found at the Alepotrypa site.

Archaeologists believe that the early farmers who inhabited this area ate mostly barley and wheat, and suggest that non-lethal head injuries found on the skulls may indicate violent confrontations. Primary burial, cremation, and secondary burial are all represented at the site; the site was also used for shelter and storage. Evidence of cultic practice has also been found, including the head of a stalagmite-type marble idol.

Analyses of trace elements in the stalagmites of the Alepotrypa Cave provide evidence of prehistoric human activities such as the burning of dry dung fuel. Analysis has also yielded evidence of climate variation, including several periods of drought.

In addition to being one of the earliest-known inhabited sites in the southern Laconia region of the Peloponnese, the Alepotrypa Cave is also one of the largest Neolithic burial sites in Europe. Burials in the cave date from between 6,000 and 3200 BC; archaeologists have found bones belonging to at least 170 different persons. Two adult human skeletons dating to the 4th millennium BC, dubbed the "Embracing Skeletons of Alepotrypa," were found at the site, along with a Mycenaean ossuary that archaeologists believe dates to the 2nd millennium BC (see "Mythology" below).

Alepotrypa Cave is noted for the way its inhabitants organized its spatial use. Areas near the entrance were used for everyday activities, with evidence of structures, burials, worn tools, and heavily worn pottery. In contrast, the deeper areas were mainly used for cultic rituals (see "Prehistoric religion"), showing evidence of the intentional breaking of decorated, rarely-used vessels, tools, and jewelry.

Paul Cartledge writes that "there was apparently no transitional Chalcolithic phase in the Peloponnese" and adds that the copper tools found in the Alepotrypa Cave "provide a convenient transition" to the Early Helladic era.

The settlement was abandoned around 3200 BC, after a catastrophic earthquake caused extensive damage that blocked the cave's entrance.

== Mythology ==
Greek mythological tradition says there was an entrance to the underworld domain of Hades, god of the dead, at the nearby site of the Temple of Poseidon at Tainaron, on what is today called Cape Matapan. Archaeologists have speculated that a later-period Mycenaean ossuary dating from 1300 BC may have been carried to the site for reburial during the late Bronze Age.

Some archaeologists, including lead excavator Giorgos Papathanassopoulos, hypothesize that the cultural memory of the Alepotrypa burial grounds had, by classical antiquity, become associated with the site of Tainaron. (Note: Anastasia Papathanasiou, co-director of the Diros excavation added that "there's no direct evidence, but we can't rule out that possibility".)
