= Ahmed Moussa (Egyptologist) =

Ahmed Mahmoud Moussa (1934–1998) was an Egyptian Egyptologist. Born in Damietta on 15 August 1934, Moussa received his B.A. in Egyptology in 1959 from Cairo University, and his PhD from the Eötvös Loránd University at Budapest in 1995.

He is famous for discovering the tomb of Khnumhotep and Niankhkhnum at Saqqara in 1964, which became somewhat of a cause célèbre among the homosexual community.

The initiation of the 100 km Pharaonic Race in Cairo was due to his 1977 discovery of an inscription describing how ancient Egyptian soldiers ran a race of 100 kilometres under king Taharqa.

Dr. Ahmed Moussa died in Guiza on 26 Nov. 1998.
