= Robert H. Dyson =

American archaeologist (1927–2020)

Robert H. Dyson, Jr. (August 2, 1927 – February 14, 2020) was an American archaeologist who served as director of the Penn Museum (1982–1994). He was best known for directing excavations at Teppe Hasanlu between 1956 and 1977.

== Education and career ==
Dyson was born in York, Pennsylvania, in 1927, and received his PhD from Harvard University in 1966. He joined the University of Pennsylvania as an associate professor of anthropology and associate curator of the Near East section of the Penn Museum. He served as the dean of the Faculty of Arts and Sciences from 1979 to 1982 and was the director of the Penn Museum from 1982 to 1994. He retired from Pennsylvania as a professor emeritus in 1995.

Dyson was awarded a Guggenheim Fellowship in 1971, served as the president of the Archaeological Institute of America, and was elected a member of the American Philosophical Society in 1984. After his retirement from Pennsylvania, a Robert H. Dyson chair was endowed at the Department of Anthropology and Near East section of the Penn Museum in his honor.

== See also ==
- Golden bowl of Hasanlu
- Hasanlu Lovers
