= Antonio Muñoz Degrain =

Spanish painter (1840–1924)

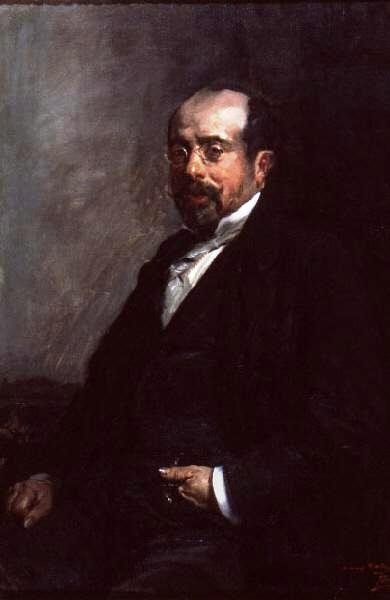
- Antonio Muñoz Degrain; portrait by Joaquín Sorolla (c.1898)
- Born: 18 November 1840; Valencia, Spain
- Died: 12 October 1924 (aged 83); Málaga, Spain
- Education: Real Academia de Bellas Artes de San Carlos de Valencia.

Antonio Muñoz Degrain (18 November 1840 – 12 October 1924) was a Spanish painter who began in the Eclectic style, later in his career he moved towards Impressionism. He is best known for his landscapes and scenes inspired by works of literature.

== Biography ==
He was born in Valencia; his father was a watchmaker. Following his parents' wishes, he began studying architecture, but soon switched to painting and enrolled at the Real Academia de Bellas Artes de San Carlos de Valencia. His time there was also short lived, as he soon moved to Rome and led a Bohemian life, becoming largely an autodidact. The rigors of surviving there prompted him to choose to return to Spain.

In 1862, he displayed his work for the first time at the National Exhibition of Fine Arts with a painting of the Pyrenees, which gained an honorable mention. After that, he became a regular exhibition participant.

In 1870, his friend Bernardo Ferrándiz Bádenes obtained a commission for him to decorate the ceiling of the Teatro Cervantes in Málaga. He was awarded the Grand Cross of the Order of Charles III in 1878 for his painting of Queen Isabella giving her jewelry to Columbus. The following year, he became a professor at the "Real Academia de Bellas Artes de San Telmo".

He made a second trip to Rome in 1882, this time on a government fellowship, and remained for two years. Upon his return, he won First Prize at the National Exhibition for his depiction of a scene from the Lovers of Teruel. In 1893, as part of the Columbian Issue, his painting of Isabella was used on a $1 U.S. postage stamp.

Five years later, he replaced Carlos de Haes in the chair of landscape painting at the Real Academia de Bellas Artes de San Fernando. He became the Director there in 1901. In 1913, upon his retirement, he donated many of his works to the Academy of San Carlos and the Museum of Fine Arts of Valencia. He died in Málaga, aged 83.

== Examples of his stylistic development ==
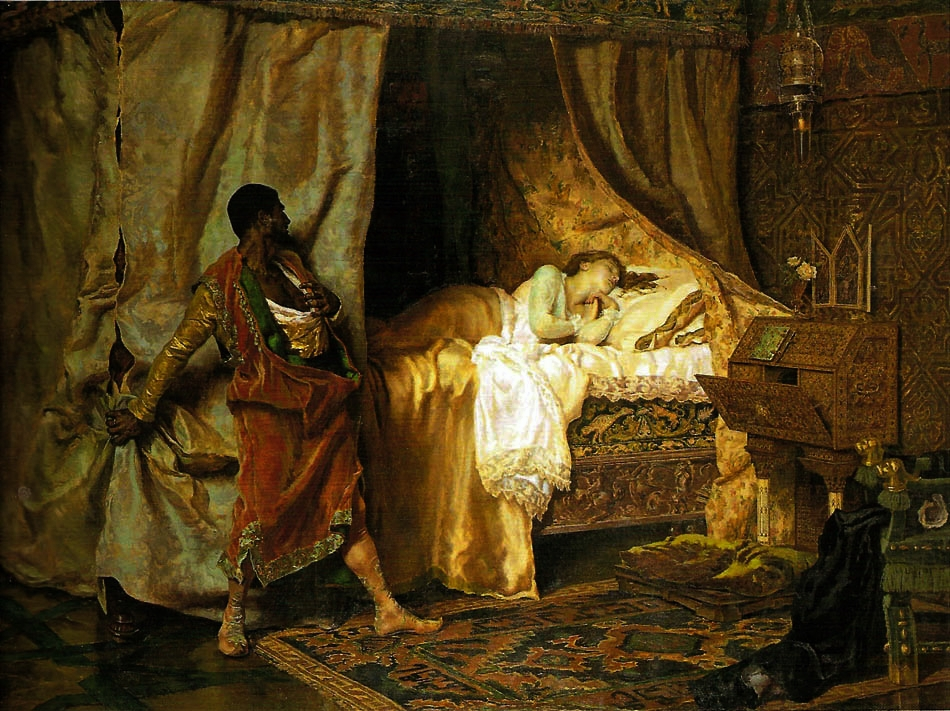
Othello and Desdemona (1880)

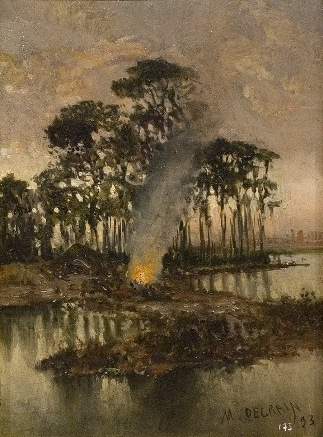
Banks of the Tiber (1893)

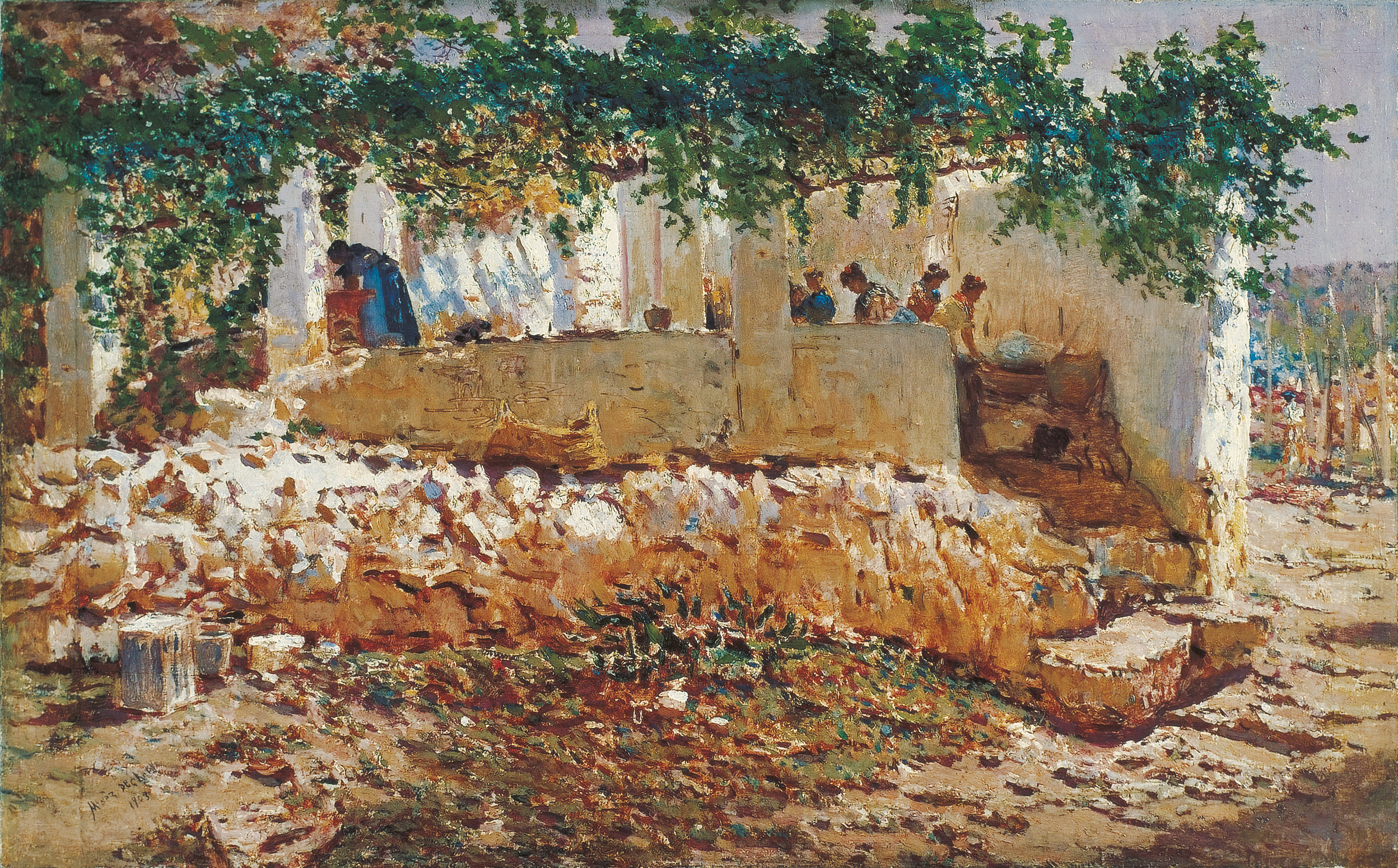
Washerwomen (1903)

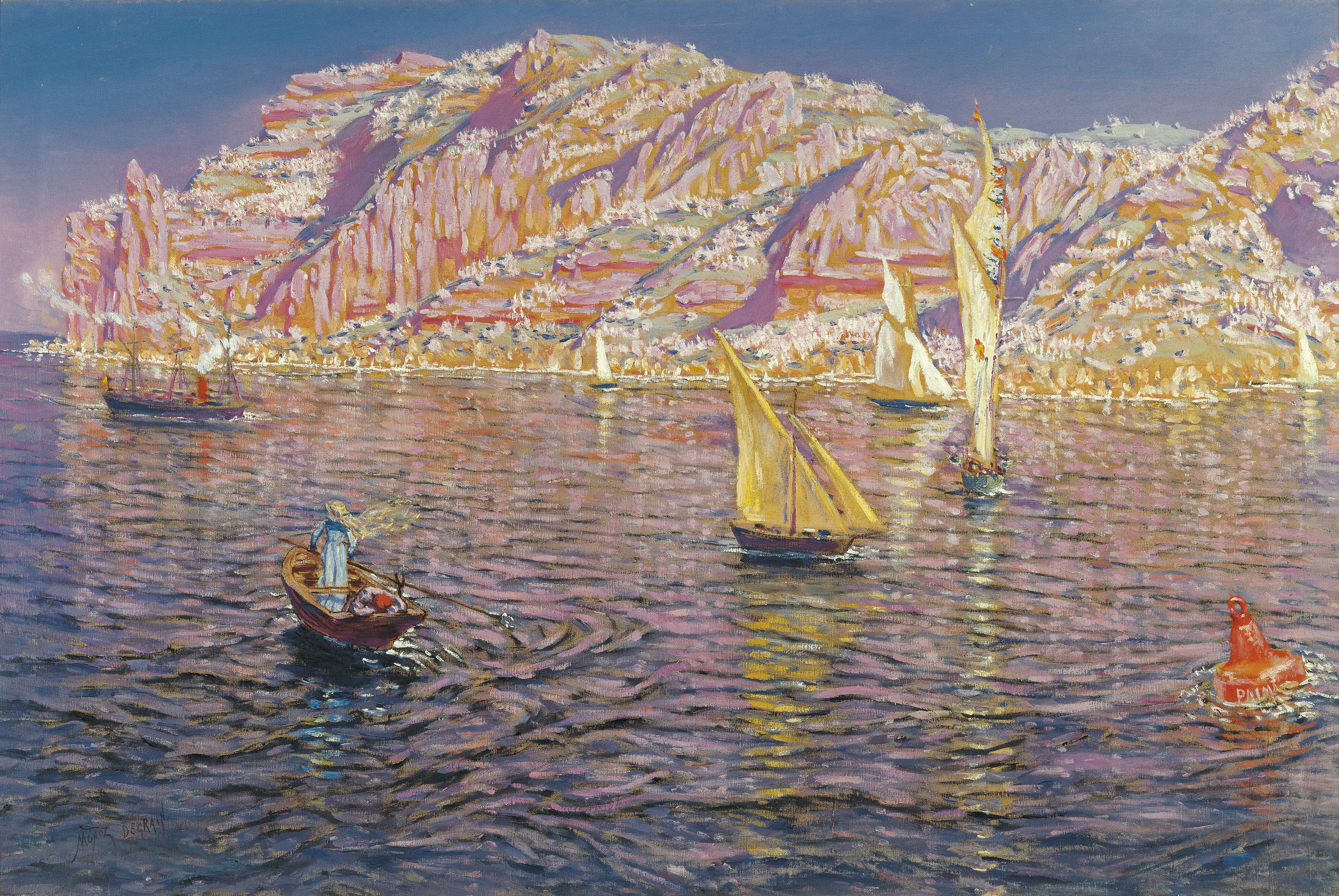
Seascape View of Palma de Mallorca (c.1910)
