= Lovers of Modena =

Pair of human skeletons discovered in Italy

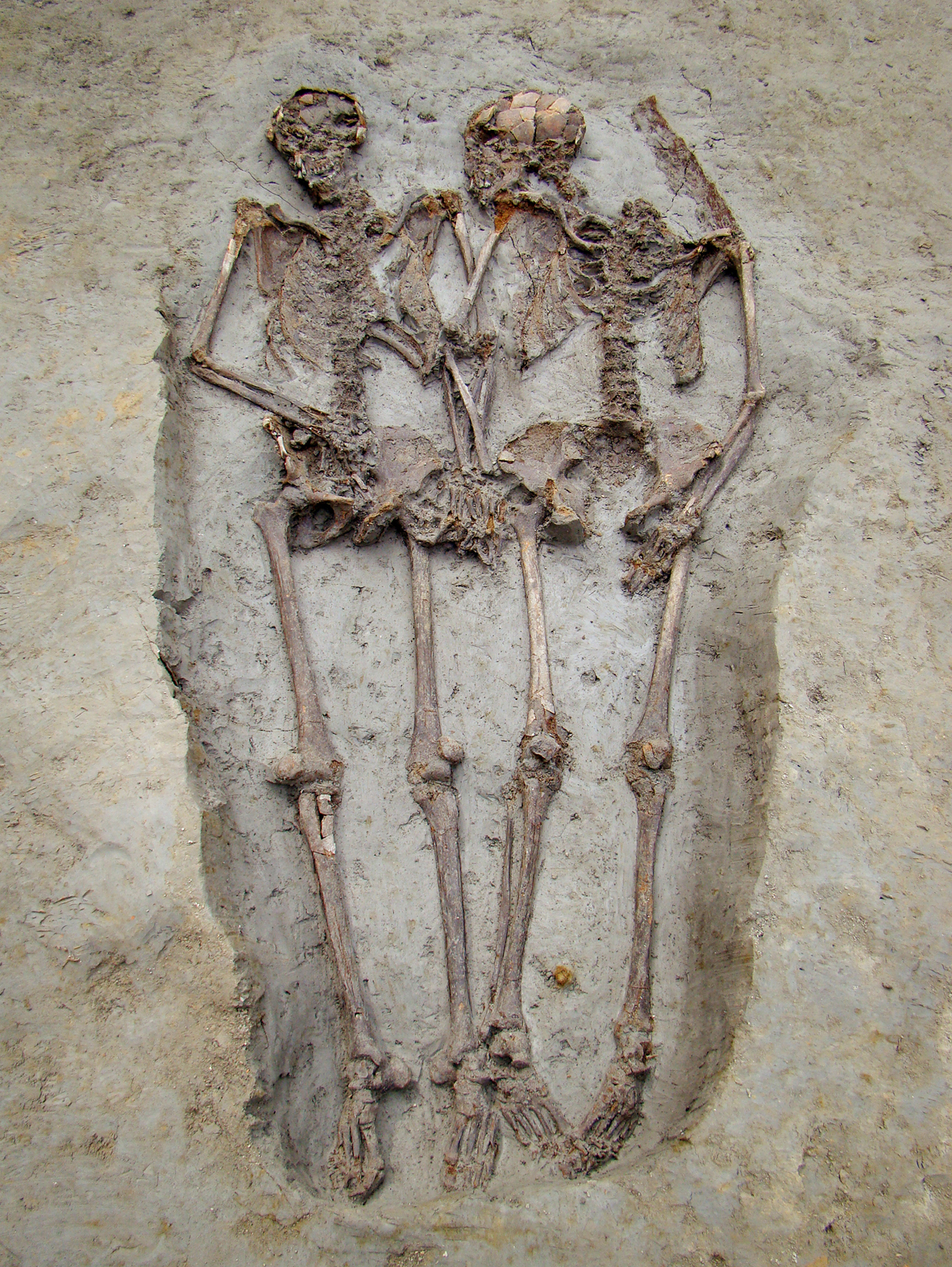
Lovers of Modena

The Lovers of Modena are a pair of human skeletons discovered in 2009 by archaeologists in present-day Modena, Italy. The two skeletons were buried with their hands interlocked and are believed to have been buried between the 4th and 6th century AD. Originally it was assumed that the two were composed of a male and a female, but upon scientific analysis of enamel peptides by the University of Bologna it was confirmed that the skeletons belong to two males. The pair are now on display at the Civic Museum of Modena.

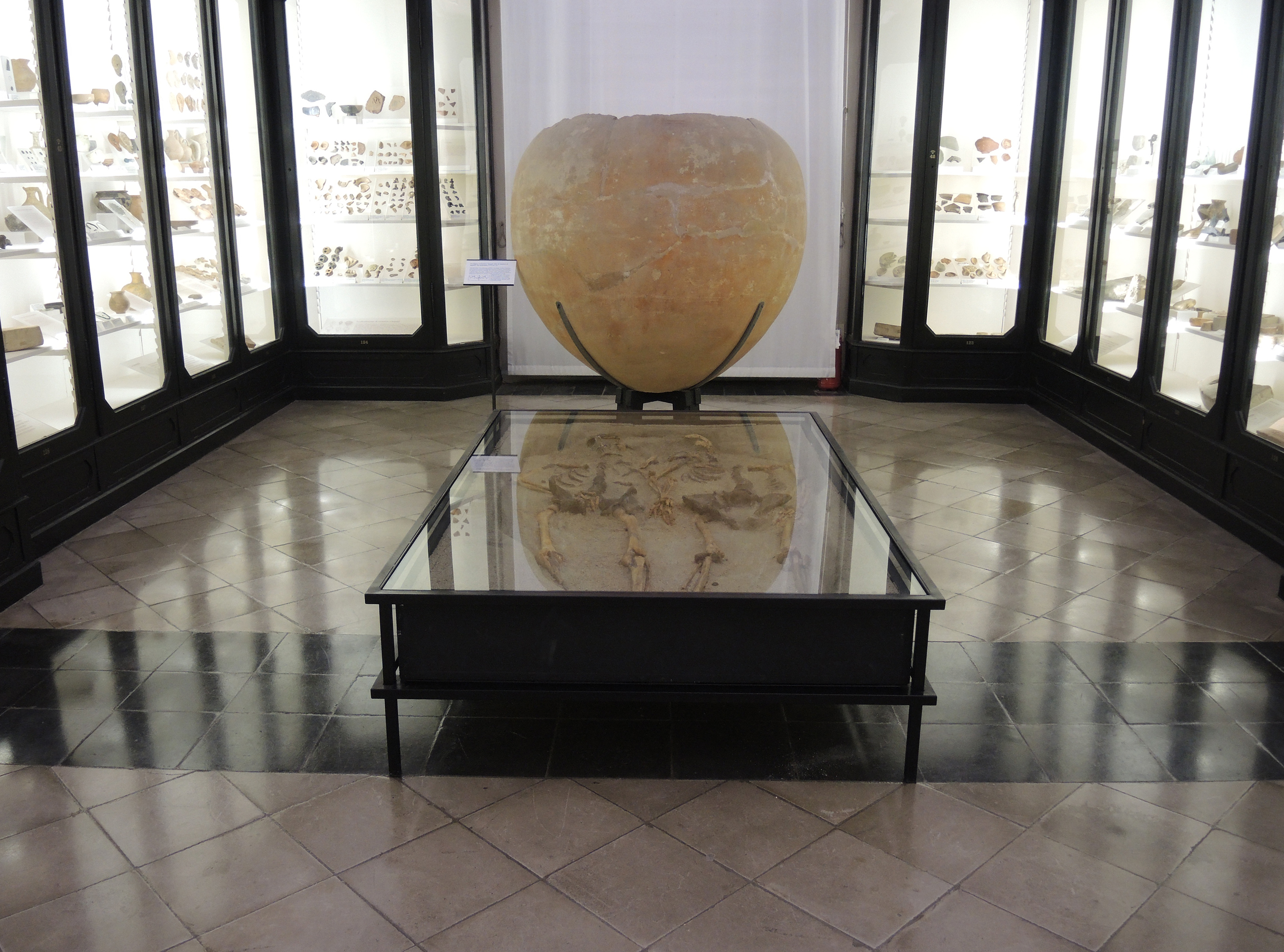
The 'Lovers of Modena' on display at the Civic Museum of Modena

== See also ==
- Lovers of Cluj-Napoca
- Lovers of Valdaro
- Embracing Skeletons of Alepotrypa
- Hasanlu Lovers
- Lovers of Teruel
