= San Pedro, Teruel =

Coordinates: 40.3426°N 1.1063°W

St. Peter's Church
- Iglesia de San Pedro
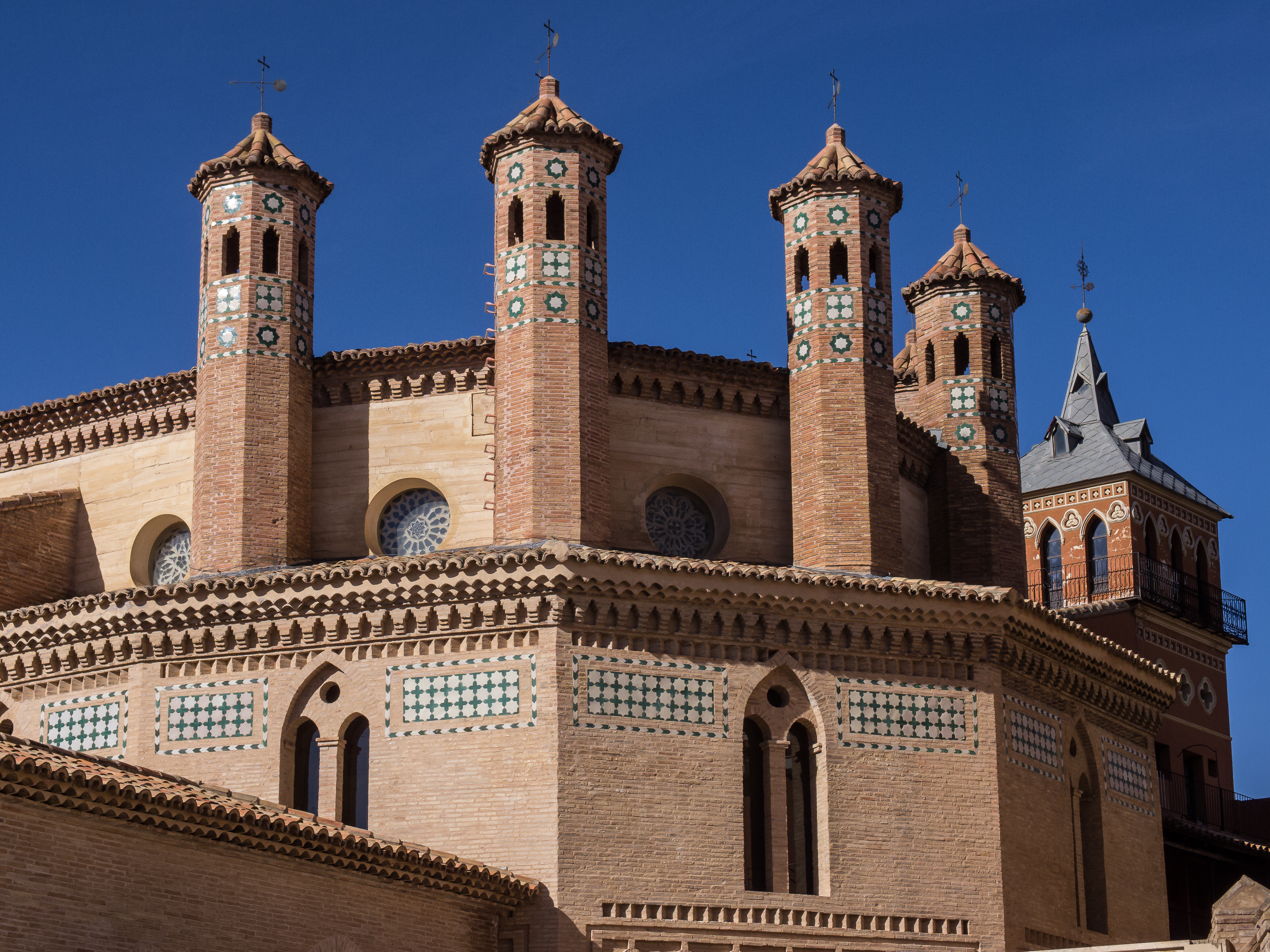
- Apse of the church
- St. Peter's Church
- Location: Teruel
- Country: Spain
- Denomination: Catholic Church

History
- Status: Church

Architecture
- Functional status: Active
- Style: Aragonese Mudéjar; Spanish Romanesque

Administration
- Archdiocese: Zaragoza
- Diocese: Teruel and Albarracín

UNESCO World Heritage Site
- Official name: Tower and church of San Pedro
- Part of: Mudéjar Architecture of Aragon
- Criteria: Cultural: (iv)
- Reference: 378ter
- Inscription: 1986 (10th Session)
- Extensions: 2001, 2016

Spanish Cultural Heritage
- Type: Non-movable
- Criteria: Monument
- Designated: 3 June 1931
- Reference no.: RI-51-0000926

St. Peter's Church (Spanish: Iglesia de San Pedro) is a 14th-century church and 13th century bell tower in Teruel, located in the Province of Teruel in the Aragon region of northeastern Spain.

== Architecture ==
The church and tower are examples of Aragonese Mudéjar and Romanesque architecture.

The brick bell tower is incrusted with glazed ceramic tiles.

The exterior of the church is also decorated with tiles, and has a polygonal apse reinforced with tower structures. The interior comprises a single nave with an ogive vaulted ceiling, and side chapels.

== Landmarks ==
The church and tower are part of the UNESCO Mudéjar Architecture of Aragon World Heritage Site. They are also Bienes de Interés Cultural landmarks in the Province of Teruel.

== Gallery ==
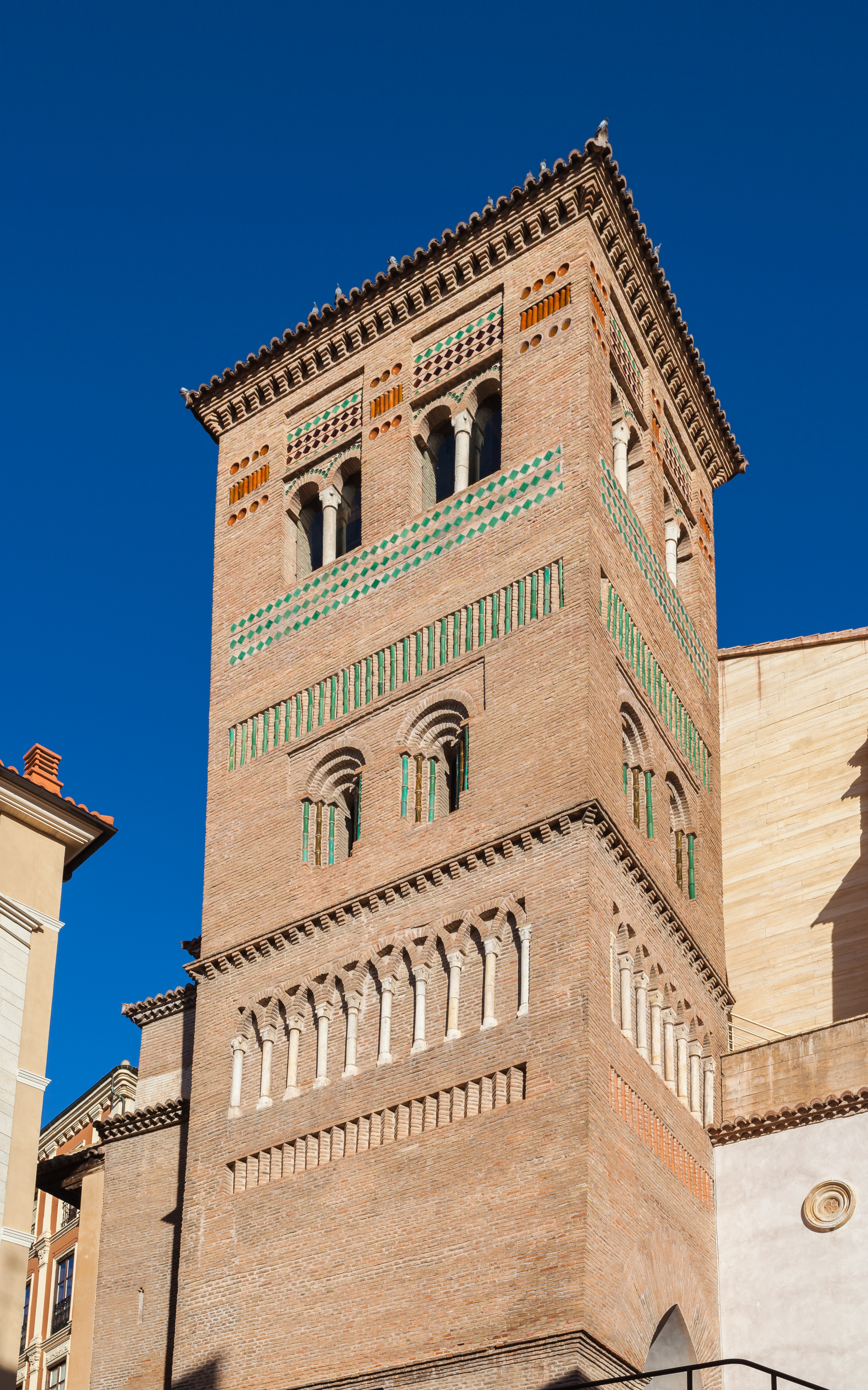
Bell tower

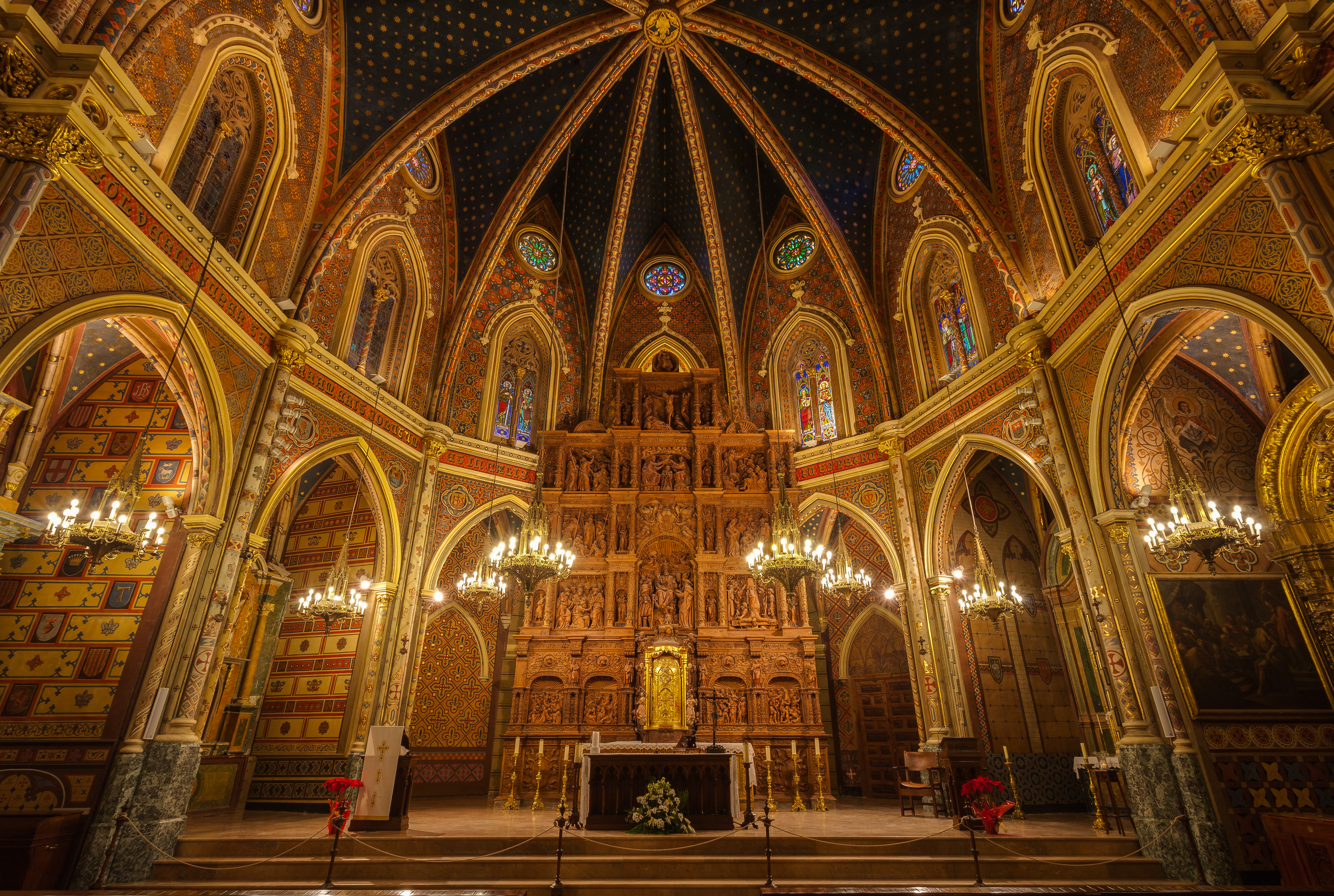
Interior of the church

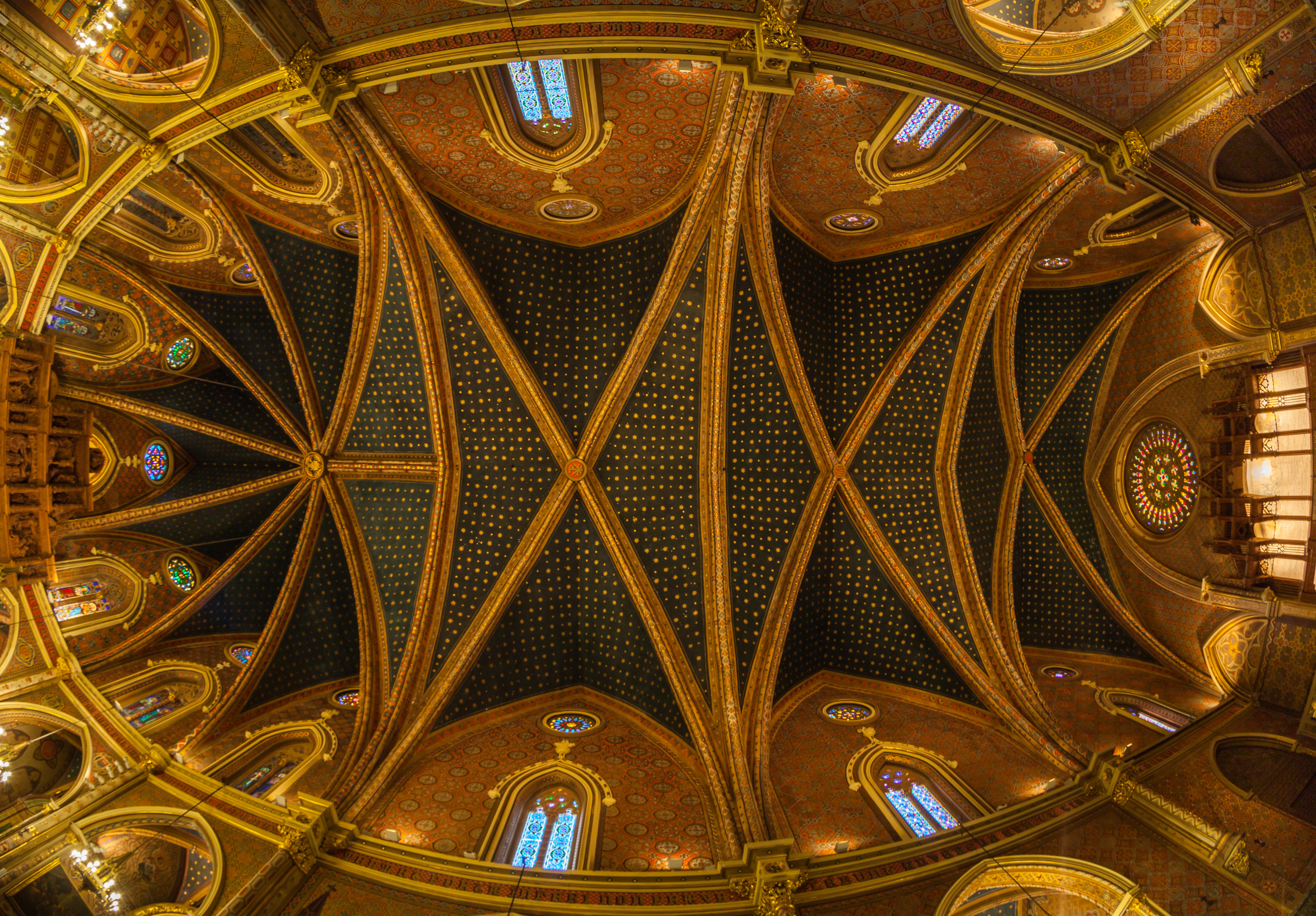
Ceiling

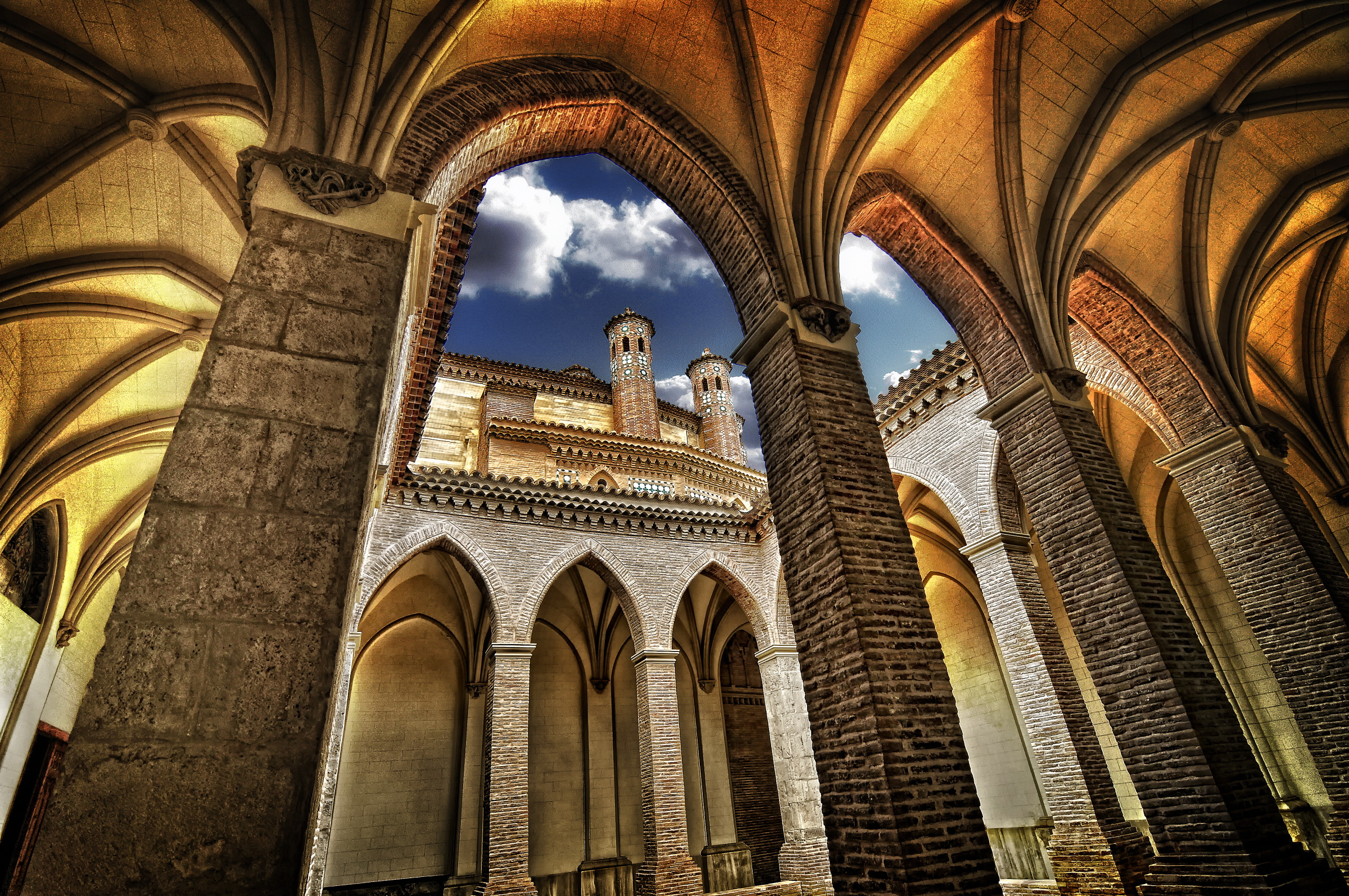
Cloister

== See also ==
- Catholic Church in Spain
- Tomb of the Lovers of Teruel
- List of Bienes de Interés Cultural in the Province of Zaragoza
