= Lovers of Teruel =

Spanish legend

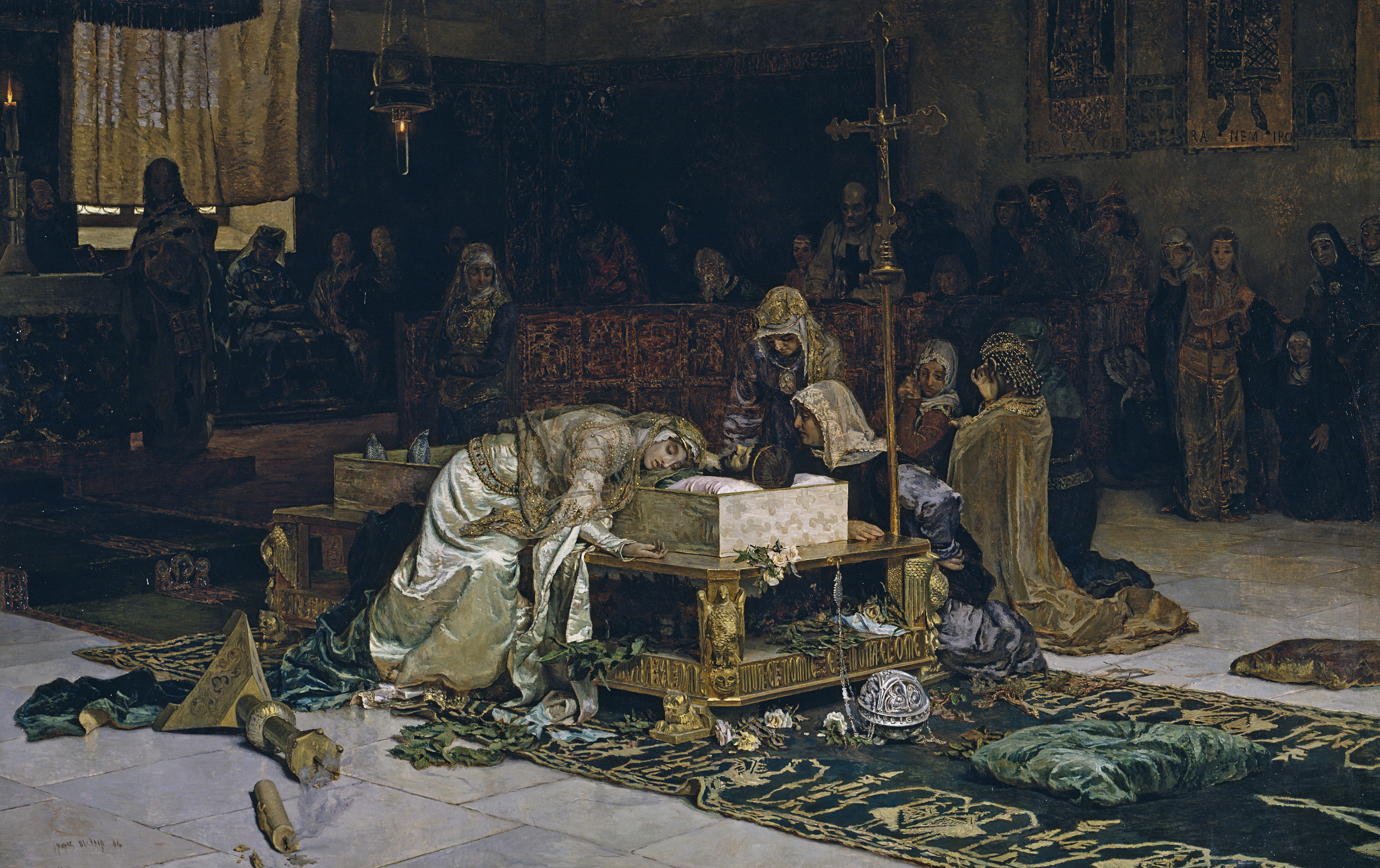
Los amantes de Teruel by Antonio Muñoz Degrain

The Lovers of Teruel (Spanish: Los amantes de Teruel) is a popular romance story. It is alleged to have taken place in 1217 in the city of Teruel (Aragón).

Notable versions include a play written by Juan Pérez de Montalbán, first printed in 1635.

== Story ==
In the city there were two important and wealthy families, Marcilla and Segura. Juan Diego Garcés de Marcilla (also known as Diego) and Isabel de Segura were their children. The two were in love as childhood playmates, but when they were both at an eligible age to wed, Diego's family had fallen on hard times. Isabel's father, being the most wealthy in all of Teruel, forbade the marriage. Diego, however, was able to make an agreement with the father in which he would leave Teruel for five years to try to build his fortune. If Diego was able to gain wealth within those five years he would be able to marry his love, Isabel.

During those five years Isabel's father pestered her to marry someone. She replied to him by saying that God wished her to remain a virgin until she turned twenty, saying that women should learn how to manage the household before getting married. Because her father loved her dearly and wished for her happiness he agreed, and for five years they waited for Diego's return.

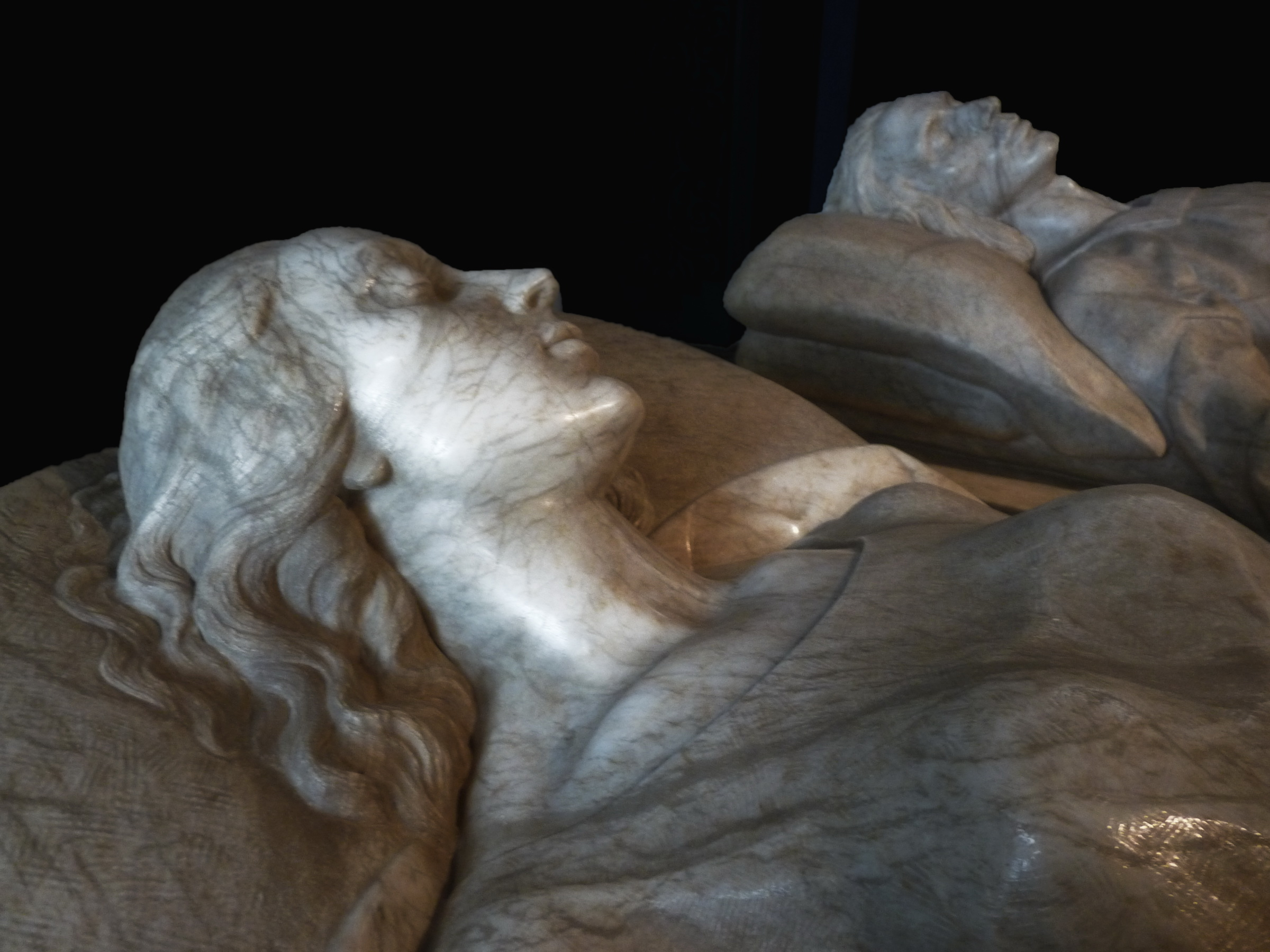
Lovers of Teruel

Diego was not heard from in those five years and so on the day of the five years' close Isabel's father married her to Don Pedro de Azagra from Albarracín. Right after the wedding ceremony there was a commotion at the Zaragoza gate. The watchmen informed the village that Diego Marcilla had returned with great riches and with the intent of marrying Isabel. Diego had not counted the day in which he petitioned Isabel's father whereas the Seguras had.

That night, Diego sneaked into the bedroom of Isabel and her husband and gently awoke her. He pleaded to her, "Bésame, que me muero," ("Kiss me for I am dying") and she refused, saying "No quiera Dios que yo falte a mi marido," ("God would not wish me to deceive my husband") "Por la pasión de Jesucristo os suplico que busques a otra, que de mi no hagais cuenta. Pues si a Dios no ha complacido, tampoco me complace a mi." ("For the love of Christ, I beg you to find another, and forget about me. If our love could not please God, then neither should it please me.")

He begged her one last time, saying that he was dying and wished for a final kiss. But still she refused. Upon hearing this Diego could not bear the separation between himself and his love, and with a sigh he died on the feet of his beloved Isabel. When she realized that he died, she shivered. She woke her husband, telling him that his snoring scared her and she wished to hear a story. And he did, and in return she told him her own story. She told him of Diego and how he lay dead beside the bed.

"Oh, you wretched! Why did you not kiss him?"

"To not deceive my husband." She replied.

"Of course," he groaned. "You are a woman worthy of praise."

They agreed on secretly burying him in the local church because the husband feared that he would be blamed for his death. The next day, during the funeral for Diego Marcilla, Isabel showed up dressed in her wedding dress. She proceeded to walk to the front of the church and place a kiss on the man whom she had refused but in doing so Isabel died, falling prostrate on the body of the man whom she loved.

== History ==
The two deaths caused by love inspired the citizens of Teruel and they demanded that the two be buried side by side so that at least in death they could be together. This request was granted by the church. The fame of the couple soon spread through Spain and in 1560 their mummies were exhumed and placed in the tombs where they now rest.

== Controversy ==
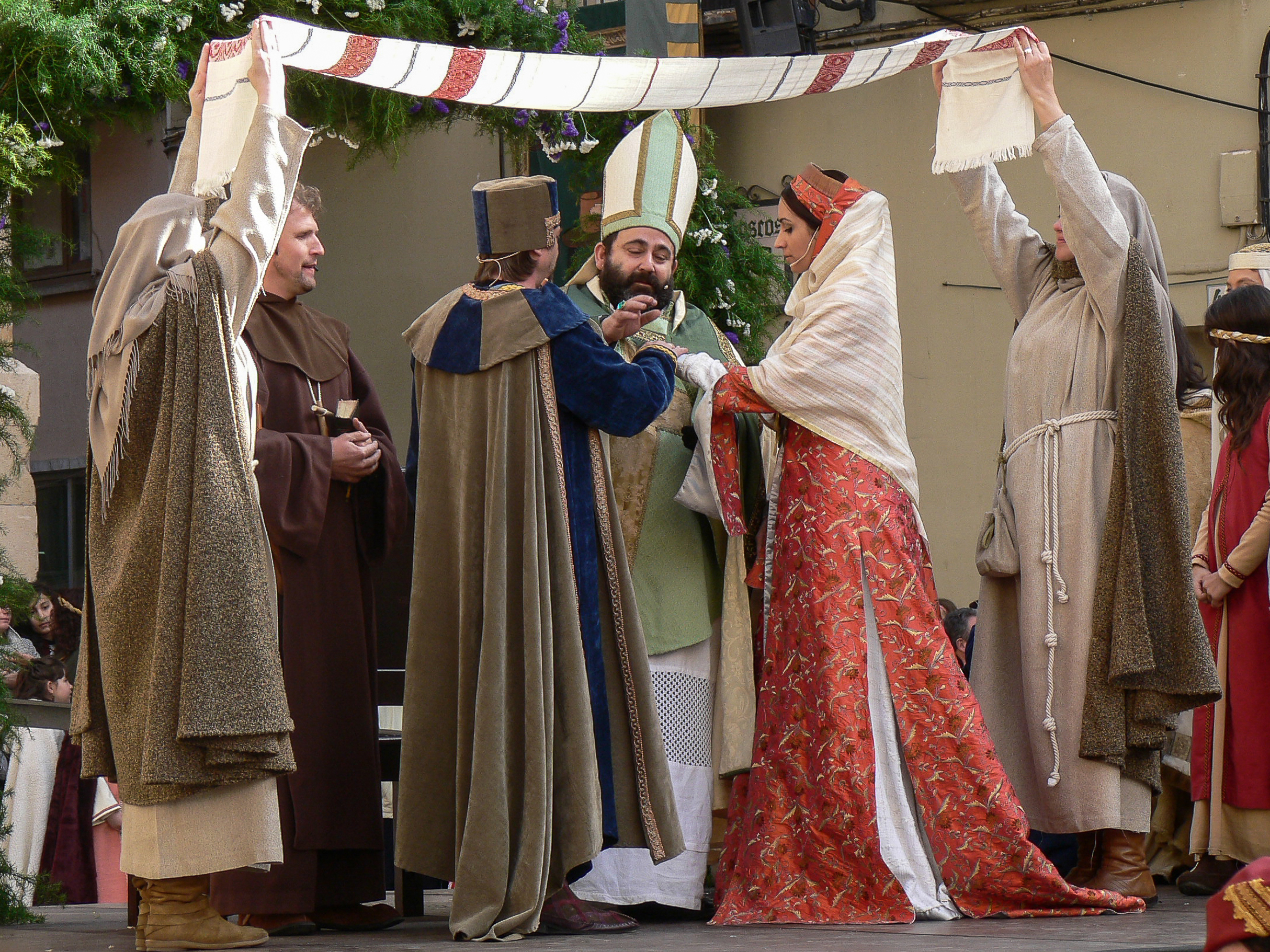
Contemporary festival of the Weddings of Isabel de Segura.

Many scholars have debated the authenticity of the Lovers of Teruel. As James Michener argued in his 1968 book Iberia:

...especially since the Italian Boccaccio in 1353 told practically the same tale under the name ‘Girolamo e Salvestra’, except that he introduced considerable salacious and amusing material. (p.811)

However:

...it is likely that the more erotic version came second; specifically, it is difficult to find instances in which popular taste borrowed an erotic tale from a professional writer and retold it with the erotic elements missing. (p.812)

It is unlikely that the simple folk of Teruel borrowed a risqué tale from Boccaccio and cleaned it up in their retelling; whereas it would be reasonable to say that a professional and sophisticated writer of Boccaccio's skill could borrow a sentimental folk tale emanating from Teruel and introduce the erotic elements in his version. Therefore, it seems much more likely that it was Boccaccio who did the borrowing. Throughout history, other cultures have had similar tales of forbidden love, such as Hero and Leander and Romeo and Juliet.

== Tombs of the Lovers ==
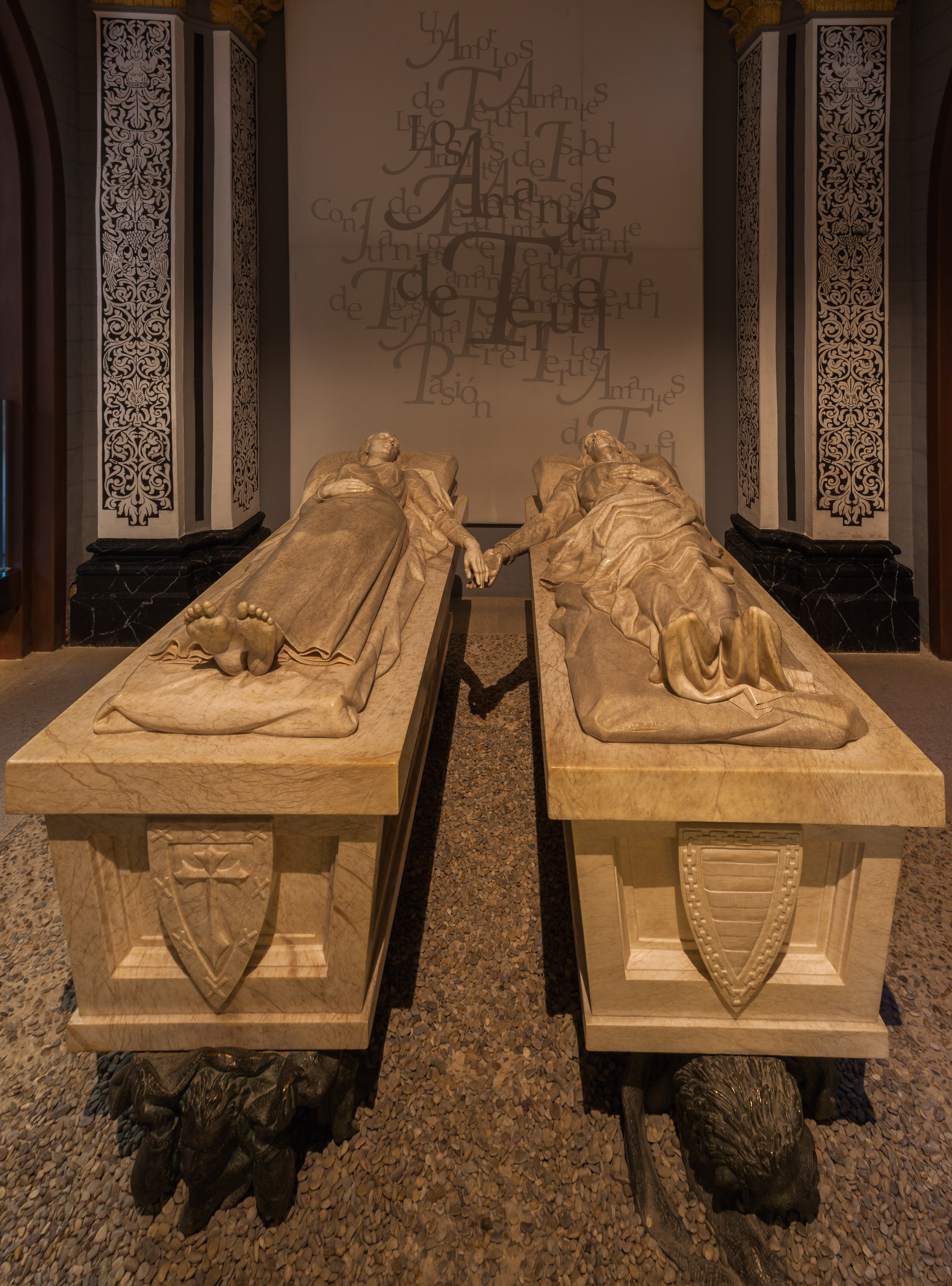
Tomb of the Lovers of Teruel in St. Peter's Church, Teruel

Since many people came across Spain to see the Lovers of Teruel, the mummies were exhumed and put into two new tombs that were sculpted by Juan de Ávalos. The tombs are carved out of marble and bear the family shields of Marcilla and Segura, but the most attractive part of the tombs are the lids. The lids are exquisitely carved: one features the strong and handsome Diego, his one arm outstretched, reaching for his love Isabel – his hand comes close to touching her, but because of religious piety they do not touch (since Isabel was married). The lid for Isabel is radiant and most beautiful. According to 'professor' Antonio Beltrán, the legend grew when two mummies were found in St. Peter's Church, Teruel, Aragón, Spain, in 1555; and it was believed that they were Diego Marcilla and Isabel Segura, the lovers.

== See also ==
- Lovers of Valdaro
- Lovers of Modena
- Lovers of Cluj-Napoca
- Embracing Skeletons of Alepotrypa
