= Temple of Poseidon (Tainaron) =

Ancient temple in southern Greece

The Temple of Poseidon at Tainaron was an Ancient Greek temple and sanctuary of the god Poseidon. It was situated at the tip of the Mani Peninsula, on the Peloponnese in southern Greece. It was dedicated to the god in the form of his cultic epithet "Poseidon Asphaleius", meaning "Poseidon of Safety". The official name of the god of the sanctuary as attested by literature and inscriptions is "Poseidon at Tainaron". Tainaron was a center for the recruitment of mercenaries and the sanctuary may have been considered an asylum for runaway Greek slaves.

The area was called "Tainaron" or "Tainarios" by the ancient Greeks; the proper modern name of the landform is Cape Matapan although variations of its ancient name are used frequently. The site is the southernmost extent of mainland Greece and the second-southernmost point in mainland Europe.

== Mythology and history ==
Strabo described the sanctuary as a sacred grove with a nearby cave. The geographer Pausanias wrote of a cave-like temple with a statue to Poseidon at its entrance. The cave was thought to be the entrance to Hades. The devastating 464 BCE Sparta earthquake was interpreted as Poseidon's wrath at Spartan ephors who killed helots taking refuge in his sanctuary. It is thought that the sanctuary pre-dates the helots' subjugation by the Spartans.

The sanctuary may have been a place of refuge for slaves. The historian Polybius (c. 200 – c. 118 BCE) names it as among the asylum sanctuaries destroyed by the Aetolian Timaios around 240 BCE, and Plutarch mentions it among the asylum sanctuaries attacked by pirates in the 1st century BC. Four stelae which record the release of slaves, all dating to the fourth and fifth centuries BCE, have been recovered. Scholars believe that stone cuttings found at the north entrance of the cave were cut from these stelae.

The ruins of the temple and its precinct are a protected archaeological site. Wayfinding signage at the site refers to a nekromanteion (Greek: Νεκρομαντεῖο) or "death oracle" associated with the temple.

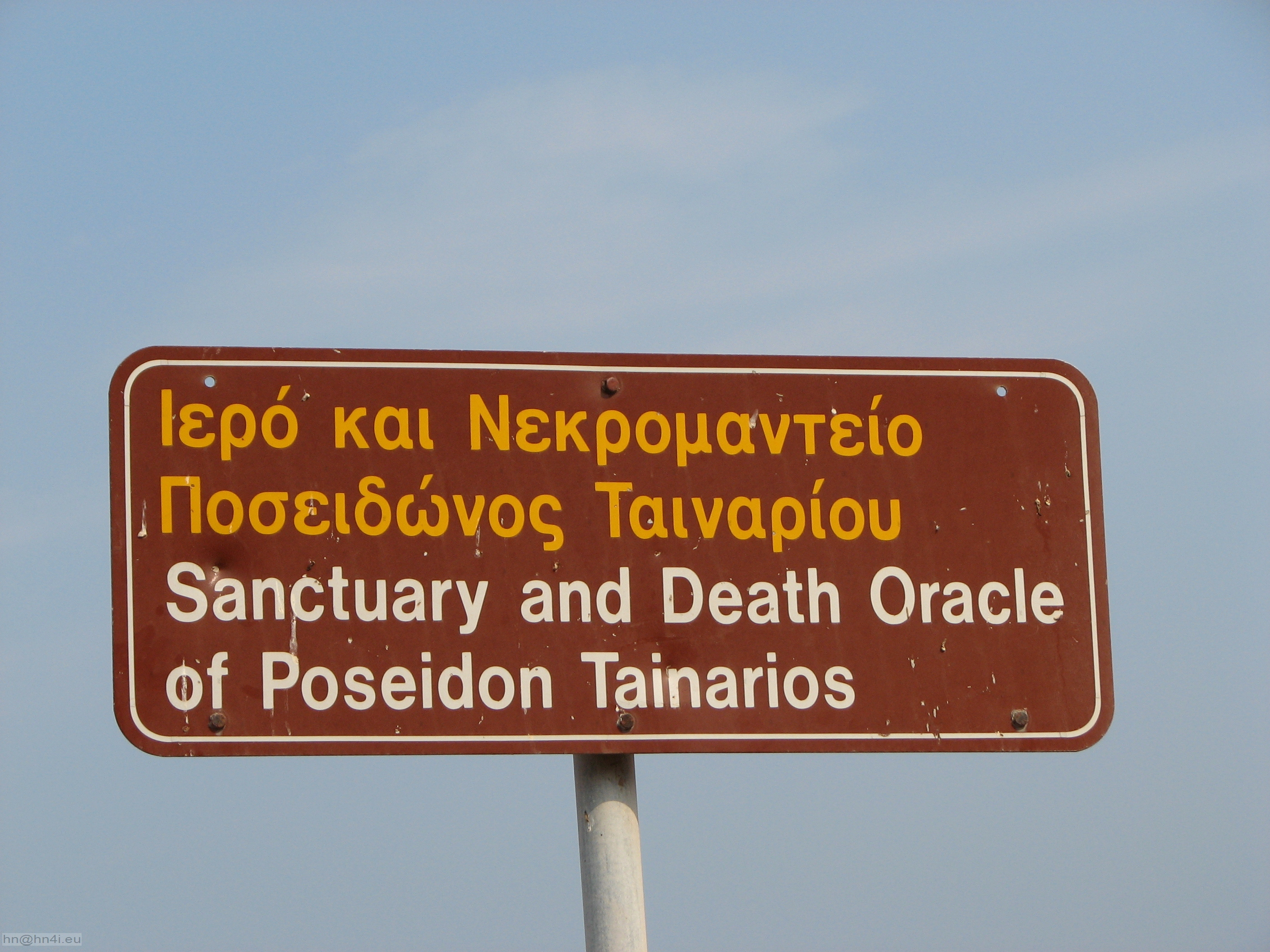
Sign at the archaeological site of Tainaron (modern Cape Matapan)

== See also ==
- List of Ancient Greek temples
- Architecture of Ancient Greece
