= Lovers of Cluj-Napoca =

Pair of human skeletons discovered in 2013 in Cluj-Napoca, Romania

The Lovers of Cluj-Napoca are a pair of human skeletons discovered in 2013 by archaeologists in the cemetery of a former Dominican convent in Cluj-Napoca, Romania. The couple are believed to have lived between 1450 and 1550 – between the year the convent was established and the year the graveyard was secularised. Analysis by archaeologists confirmed that the skeletons belong to a man and a woman around 30 years of age. The couple were buried facing each other, and with their hands interlocked.

The male appears to have died due to a fight or an accident as his sternum is broken, possibly caused by a blow from a blunt object. Another archaeologist places the blame for the man's death on a broken hip. The cause of death of the female is unclear from her skeleton. It is unlikely that she died by suicide, as that was considered a sin and would have excluded her from being buried in consecrated ground.

== See also ==
- Embracing Skeletons of Alepotrypa
- Institute of Archaeology and Art History, Cluj-Napoca
- List of unsolved deaths
- Lovers of Modena
- Lovers of Valdaro
- Lovers of Teruel
