= Cape Matapan =

Cape in Greece

Cape Matapan Cape Tainaron, Cape Tenaro
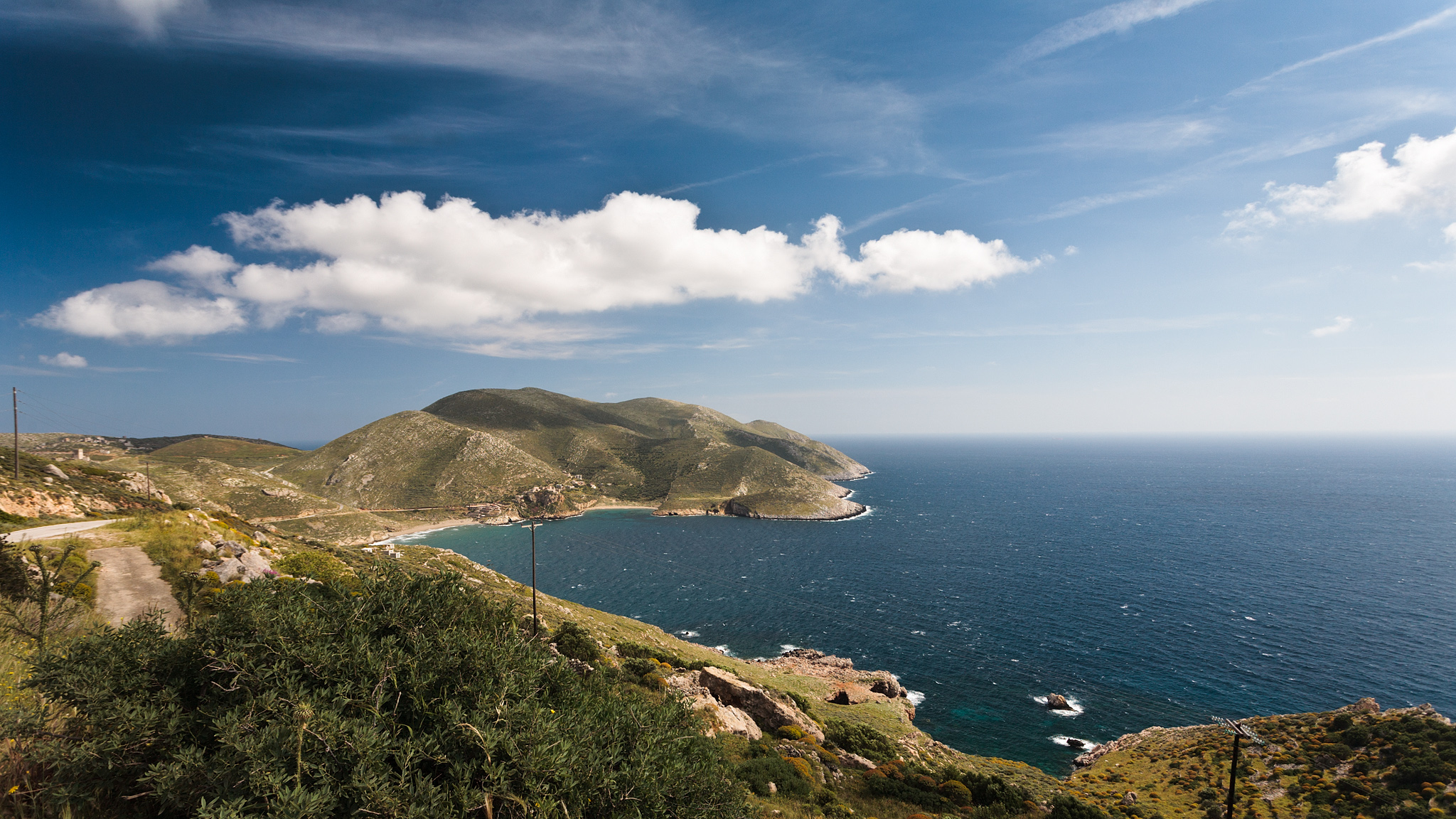
- Cape Matapan

- Location within Greece
- Coordinates: 36°23′20″N 22°28′57″E
- Location: Mani Peninsula, Laconia, Peloponnese
- Water bodies: Messenian Gulf, Laconian Gulf, Mediterranean Sea

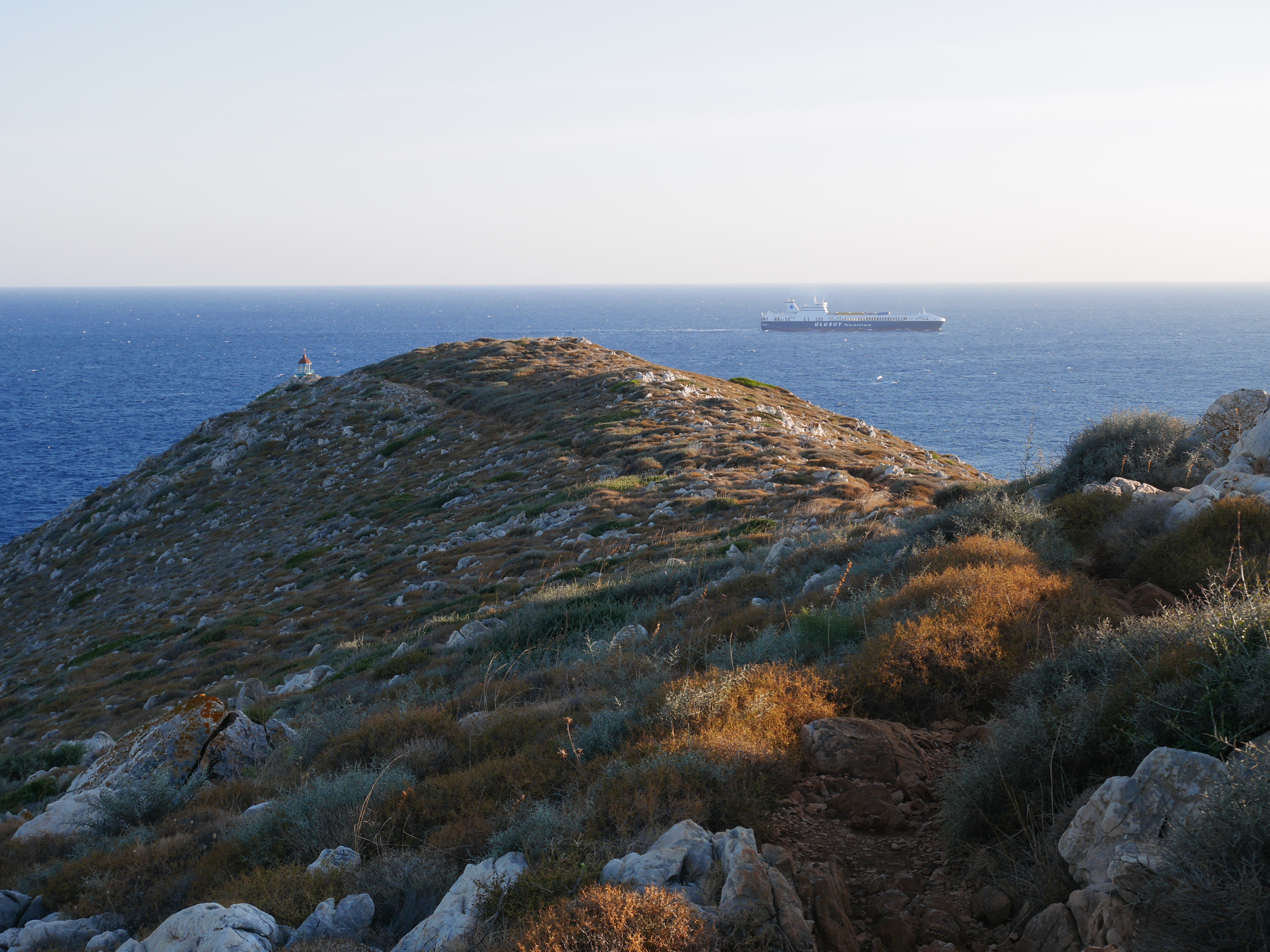
Cape Matapan.

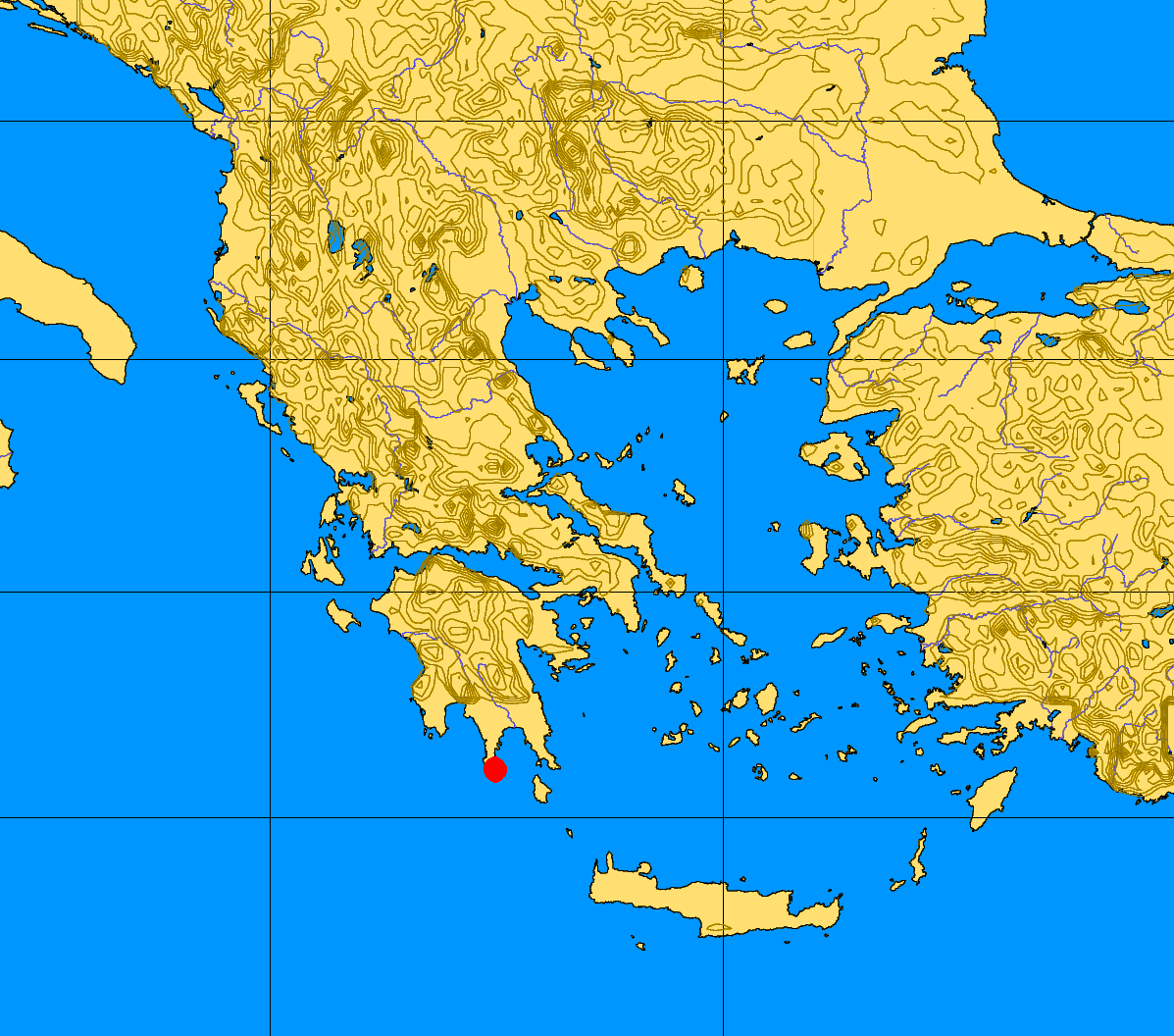
Location of Cape Matapan.

Cape Matapan (Greek: Κάβο Ματαπάς, Maniot dialect: Ματαπά), also called Cape Tainaron or Taenarum (Greek: Ακρωτήριον Ταίναρον), or Cape Tenaro, is situated at the end of the Mani Peninsula, in the Peloponnese in Greece. Cape Matapan is the southernmost point of mainland Greece, and the second southernmost point in mainland Europe. It separates the Messenian Gulf in the west from the Laconian Gulf in the east; it is on the migration route of birds headed to Africa.

Cape Taenarum in classical antiquity was the site of the city of Taenarum (Ancient Greek: Ταίναρον), now in ruins. In ancient Greek mythology the eponymous founder-hero of the city was Taenarus (Ταίναρος), who was credited with establishing the city's important temple of Poseidon.

Greeks used the expression "Tainarian evil" (Ancient Greek: Ταινάριον κακόν), meaning a great and unlawful evil affecting suppliants, as the Spartans killed the Helots who had fled into Tainaron and were suppliants in the temple of Poseidon.

== History ==
Cape Matapan has been an important place for thousands of years. Near Taenarum is a cave that Greek legends claimed was the home of Hades, the god of the dead. The ancient Spartans built several temples there, dedicated to various gods. On the hill situated above the cave lie the remnants of an ancient temple dedicated to the sea god Poseidon (Νεκρομαντεῖον Ποσειδῶνος). Under the Byzantine Empire, the temple was converted into a Christian church, and Christian rites are conducted there to this day. Cape Matapan was once the place where mercenaries waited to be employed.

A naval battle occurred there on 19 July 1717, between the Venetian navy of the Republic of Venice, supported by a mixed squadron of allied ships from Portugal, the Papal States and Malta, and the Ottoman fleet, under Kapudan Pasha Eğribozlu İbrahim Pasha. It is known as the Battle of Matapan and its results were indecisive.

In 1892 a lighthouse was constructed, but it is now in disuse.

At Cape Matapan, the Titanic's would-be rescue ship, the SS Californian, was torpedoed and sunk by German forces on 9 November 1915. In March 1941, a major naval battle, the Battle of Cape Matapan, occurred off the coast of Cape Matapan, between the Royal Navy and the Italian Regia Marina, in which the British emerged victorious in a one-sided encounter. The encounter's main result was to drastically reduce future Italian naval activity in the Eastern Mediterranean.

== See also ==
- Taenarus (mythology)
- Alepotrypa cave
- Battle of Matapan
- Battle of Cape Matapan
