= National Archaeological Museum of Mantua =

- Museo archeologico nazionale di Mantova
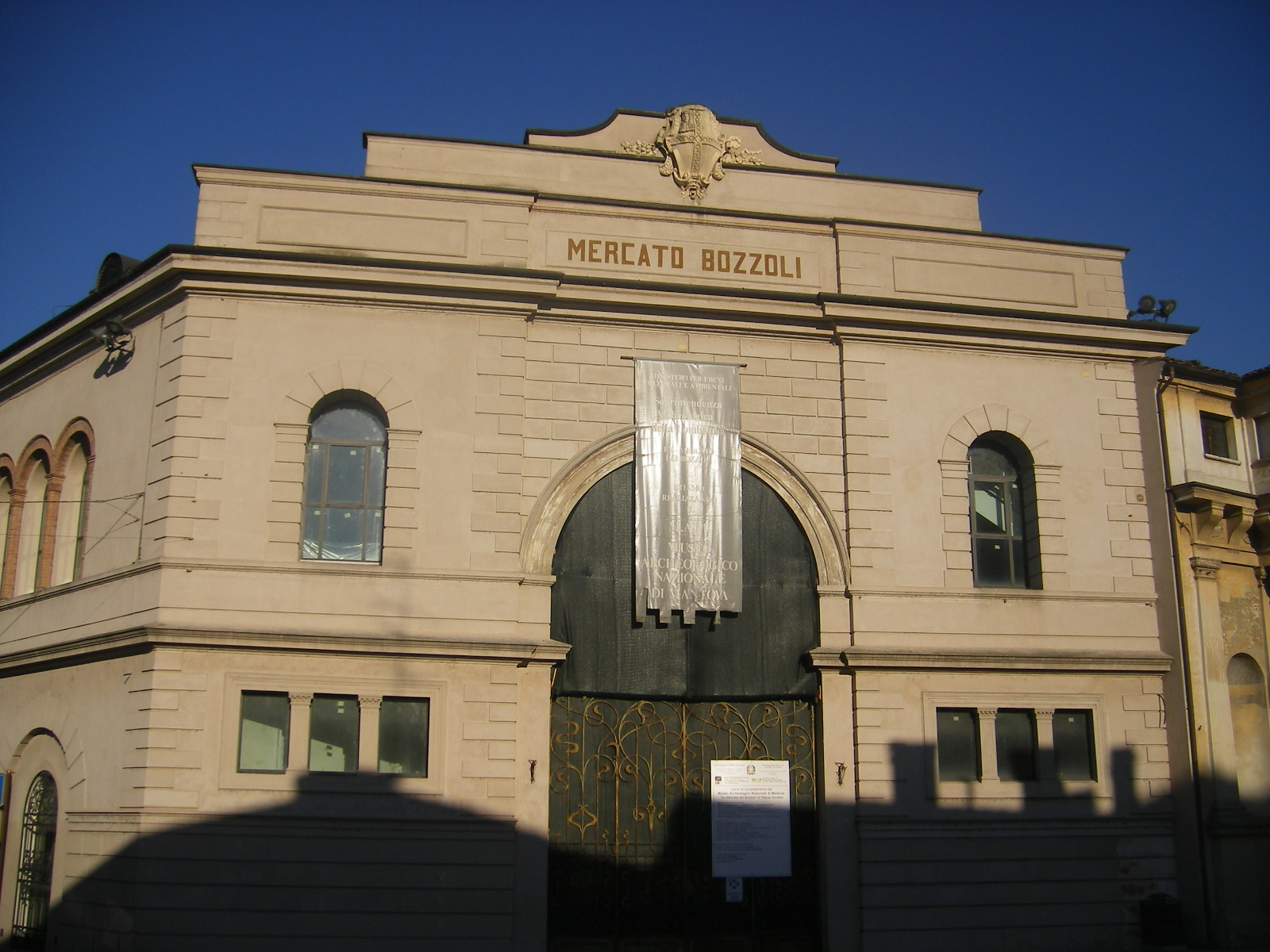
- Location: Mantua, Italy
- Coordinates: 45.1611°N 10.7989°E
- Type: museum

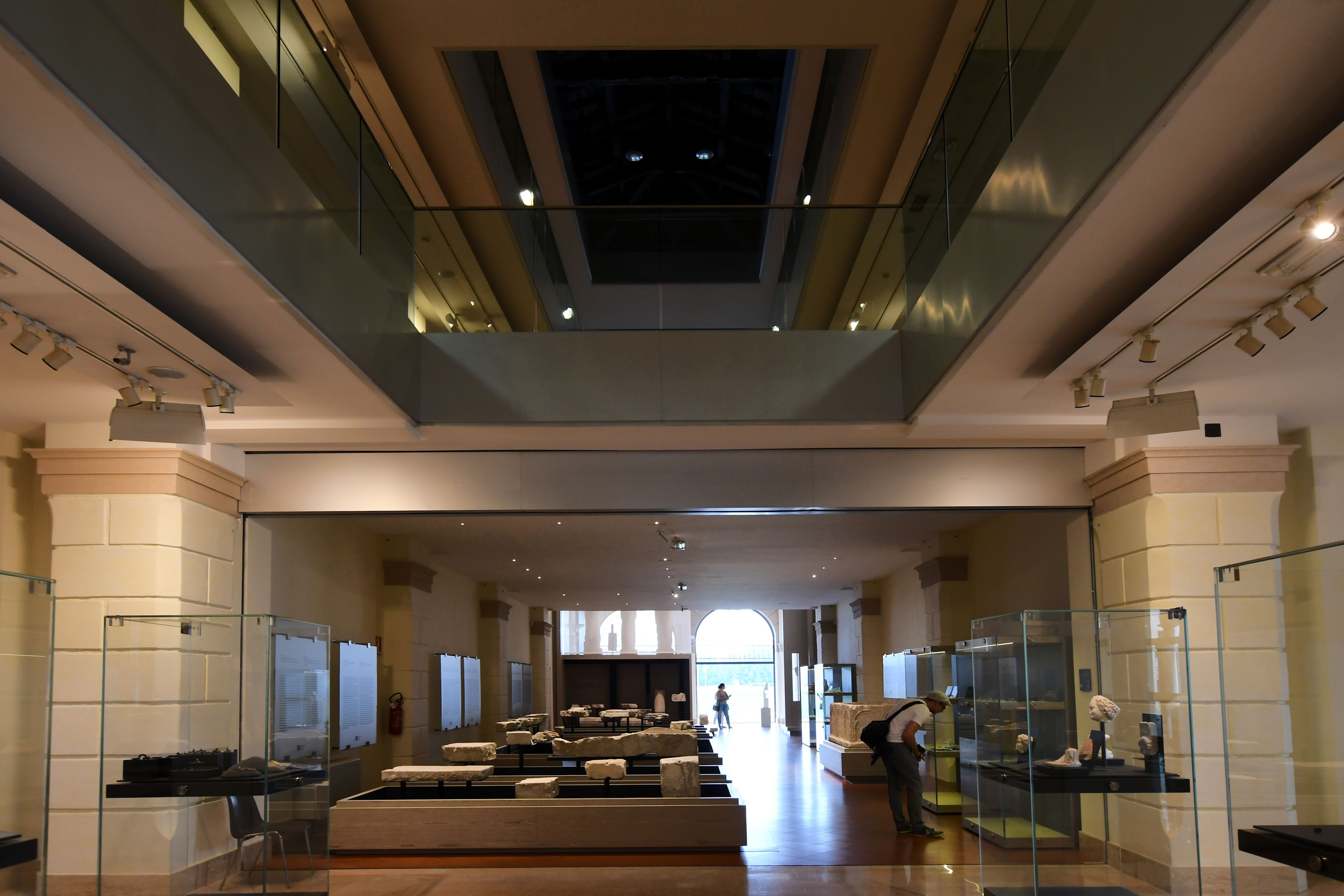
Internal view

The National Archaeological Museum of Mantua is an archaeological museum located in Mantua, Italy. It is located at the Palazzo Ducale and holds objects discovered from excavations in the surrounding territory. The museum is operated by the Ministry for Cultural Heritage and Activities of Italy.
