= Embracing Skeletons of Alepotrypa =

Neolithic skeletons in Laconia, Greece

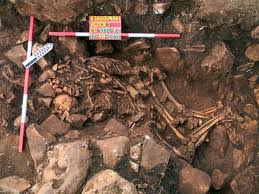
The Embracing Skeletons of Alepotrypa at Alepotypa Cave, a site of ancient funerary rites.

The Embracing Skeletons of Alepotrypa are a pair of human skeletons dated as approximately 5,800 years old. They were discovered by archaeologists in the Alepotrypa cave in Laconia, southern Greece, home to a human settlement in the Neolithic age between 6,000 B.C. and 3,200 B.C. DNA analysis confirmed that the remains belong to a man and woman who died when they were 20 to 25 years of age.

== Overview ==
The prehistoric skeletons died in a lover’s embrace with the man lying behind the woman, draping his arms over her, and with their legs intertwined.

They're totally spooning, The boy is the big spoon, and the girl is the little spoon: Their arms are draped over each other, their legs are intertwined. It's unmistakable.

—Bill Parkinson, associate curator of Eurasian anthropology at Chicago's Field Museum

Greek archaeologist Anastasia Papathanasiou said about the couple's pose, "It's a very natural hug; it doesn't look like they were arranged in this posture at a much later date." The cause of death of the two individuals is currently unknown.

== See also ==
- List of unsolved deaths
- Lovers of Cluj-Napoca
- Lovers of Modena
- Lovers of Teruel
- Lovers of Valdaro
- The Hunchback of Notre-Dame
