= Taenarum (town) =

Town of ancient Laconia

Coordinates: 36°24′06″N 22°29′12″E

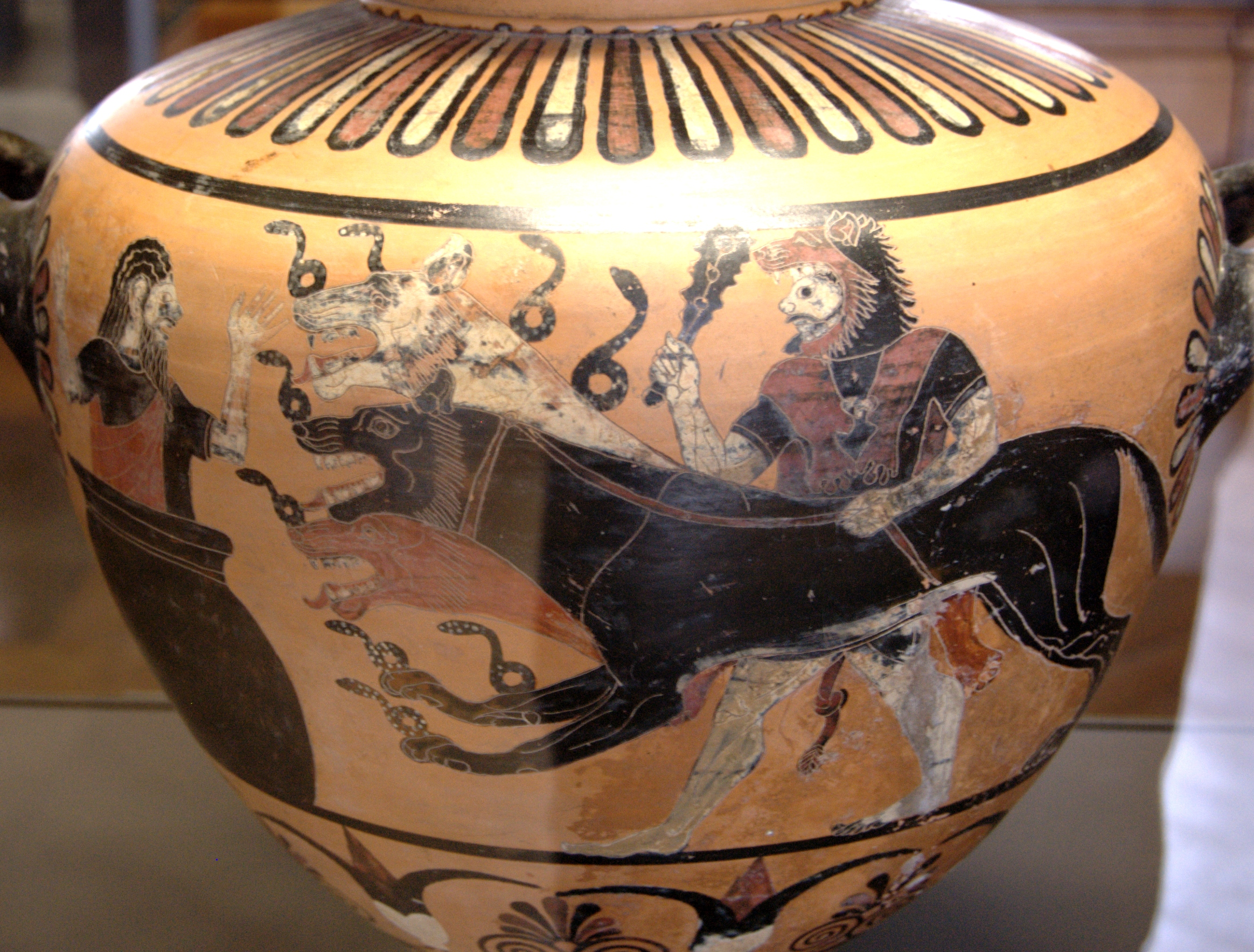
Heracles, Cerberus and Eurystheus on a hydria, c. 525 BC, now in the Louvre

Taenarum or Tainaron (Ταίναρον) or Taenarus or Tainaros (Ταίναρος), was an Ancient Greek settlement in the region of Laconia on the Mani Peninsula in the southern extreme of the Peloponnese. It was situated 40 stadia (5 miles (8.0 km)) north of Cape Tainaron, which is today called Cape Matapan. The name is sometimes anglicized as Tenarus.

Taenarum was significant in Greek mythology. A nearby cavern was considered the entrance to the Greek underworld and the opening through which Heracles dragged Cerberus into the realm of Hades and Orpheus led Eurydice. Modern-day writers have used the word "Tenarus" as a metonym for the underworld itself.

== Findings ==
An epitaph found in Taenarum records a man named Justus, son of Andromache, from Tiberias. He is believed to have been a first- or second-generation refugee displaced from Judaea in the aftermath of the First Jewish Revolt (66–73 CE).

== Resources ==
Taenarum was famous for a green marble that was much-prized in the ancient world, and for the "Marmor Taenarium" marble which was valued for its red and black highlights.

It was also a major source of the Murex sea snail used to produce Tyrian purple dye, a luxury item.
