= Pamela L. Geller =

American anthropologist (born 1974)

- Born: March 28, 1974; Philadelphia, PA
- Education: University of Pennsylvania
- Occupation: Anthropology
- Website: https://people.miami.edu/profile/ea4df3a4ff5272822bbc96c9ce9dabdb

Pamela L. Geller (born 1974) is an American anthropologist and professor of anthropology at the University of Miami. Her research interests include bioarchaeology and archaeology, sex, gender, and sexuality; biopower and necropolitics, socio-politics of the past, bioethics and dead bodies and the archaeology of plastics.

== Education ==
Geller graduated with a Ph.D. from the University of Pennsylvania in 2004. Her doctoral dissertation examined pre-Columbian Maya burials from northwestern Belize to document intentional manipulation of bodies in life and after death. Bioarchaeological evidence demonstrated that intentionally changing bodies of the living and the dead facilitated (re)construction of individuals’ identities in ancient Maya communities. She has conducted anthropological fieldwork in Hawaii, Belize, Honduras, Perú, and Haiti.

== Career ==
Geller has authored several books, including The Bioarchaeology of Social-Sexual Lives (2017), Theorizing Bioarchaeology (2021), and Becoming Object: The Sociopolitics of the Samuel George Morton Cranial Collection (2024). She is also the editor of Feminist Anthropology: Past, Present, and Future (2006) and The Routledge Handbook of Feminist Anthropology (2025). In addition to the numerous academic journal articles and book chapters she has written, her opinion essays have appeared in Slate, Miami Herald, the New York Times, and The Conversation.
