= Mani Peninsula =

Geographical and cultural region in Greece

Coordinates: 36.5590°N 22.4303°E

Mani
- Peninsula
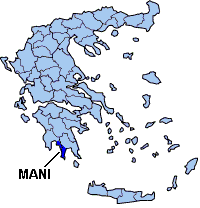
- Location of the Mani Peninsula

- Location within Greece
- Interactive map of Mani
- Location: Peloponnese, Greece
- Municipalities: East Mani, West Mani
- Population (2021): 18,654

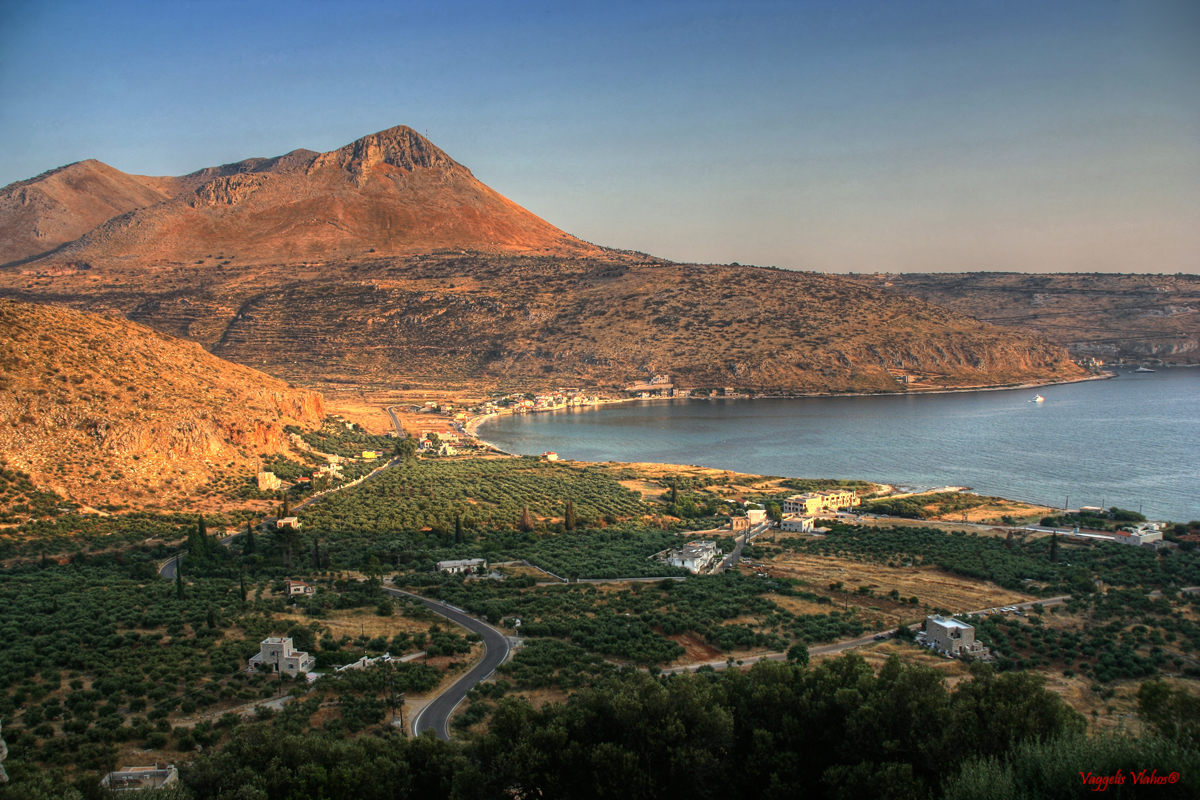
Landscape in Mani

The Mani Peninsula is a geographical and cultural region of the Peloponnese in southern Greece. It is often referred to as Mani (Greek: Μάνη) or "the Mani". The inhabitants of Mani are known as Maniots (Mανιάτες, Maniátes). Mani and the Maniots played a key role in the Greek War of Independence that began in 1821.

The Mani is the central of the three peninsulas extending southwards from the Peloponnese into the Mediterranean Sea. To Mani's east lie the Laconian Gulf and the peninsula of Cape Maleas, and to its west, the Messenian Gulf and the peninsula of Messenia. The Mani Peninsula is the southern extension of the Taygetus mountain range. It is about 45 km (28 mi) long, with a rocky, rugged, interior bordered by scenic coastlines. Mani terminates at Cape Matapan, the southernmost point of continental Greece.

In ancient times, Mani was considered part of Laconia, a region dominated by the powerful city-state (polis) of Sparta. Its administration is now divided between the municipalities of East Mani in modern Laconia, and West Mani in Messenia. Mani's towns include Areopoli, Gytheio, and Pyrgos Dirou. Notable sites in Mani include the ruins of the ancient Temple of Poseidon at Cape Matapan, the Monastery of Panayia Yiatrissa, and the Apidima Cave with its Neanderthal fossils.

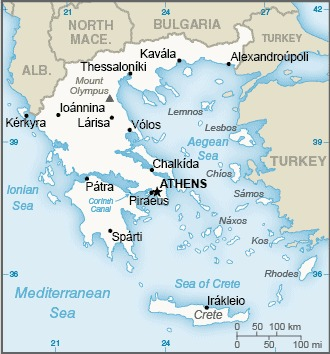
Lying due south of Sparta (Spárti), Mani is the central of three peninsulas extending into the Mediterranean Sea.

Mani was known as Maina Polypyrgos ('Many-Towered Maina') for its numerous tower-houses. From 1978 onwards, the Greek state decreed many settlements with tower-houses "traditional", setting restrictions on construction. In 2003, the whole peninsula was designated (Note: Under the "Regional Framework of Spatial Planning and Sustainable Development of the Peloponnese Region".) a "cultural complex of international importance".

== Name ==
The origin of the name "Mani" is uncertain. (Note: Speculative explanations include its derivation from μανία, manía; from the Albanian word for mulberry tree, manit; and from the adjective μανός, manós 'sparse, thin'.) The earliest known record is a reference to the bishop of a diocese – ὁ Μαΐνης (ho Maïnēs, 'the one who is [bishop] of Maïna') – in a hierarchical list of dioceses deposited in the archives of the Patriarchate of Constantinople in 907. Compiled during the reign of Emperor Leo VI, (Note: The list produced in 907 is an example of a type of official document known as a Notitia episcopatuum, 'register of dioceses', or, in the Byzantine administrative system more generally, a Τακτικόν (Taktikon, 'orderly list').) it shows Maïna's bishop as subordinate to the metropolitan of Corinth. In around 950, Constantine VII mentioned the inhabitants of a "city of Maïna" in his treatise De Administrando Imperio (On Administering the Empire).

The 14th-century Greek-text version of the Chronicle of Morea narrates how William of Villehardouin, ruler of the Principality of Achaea (r. 1246–1278), journeyed εἰς τὴν Μάνην (eis tēn Manēn, 'to Mani') and built a castle he named Μάνη (Manē, 'Mani') on a promontory there. (Note: Heslop (2021) refers to lines 2995–3007 of the Greek-text Chronicle, citing John Schmitt's edited version (1904) (p. 201).) The castle is more usually known as Grand Magne.

== Ecology ==
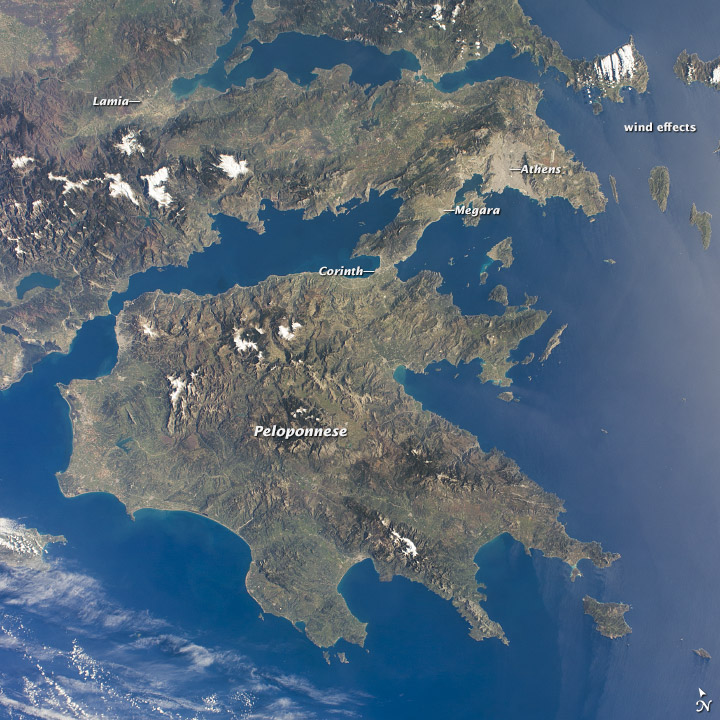
The dark-toned Taygetus mountain range, with snow-covered peaks, runs down the spine of Mani, the central peninsula jutting southwards from the Peloponnese, in this March 2014 photo taken by an astronaut on the International Space Station.

The Mani is in the Aegean and Western Turkey Sclerophyllous and Mixed Forests ecoregion, (Note: Sclerophyllous vegetation generally has hard leaves with short distances between them along the stem.) which is part of a biome known as Mediterranean Forests, Woodlands, and Scrub.

=== Governance ===
The southern part of the peninsula, covering about 317 km^{2} (122 sq mi), is a Special Protection Area (SPA) within the Natura 2000 network. Harbouring 72 bird species, it was designated in 2010 under the Birds Directive of the European Union. The SPA is an important habitat for migrating raptors, notably Bonelli's eagle, the short-toed snake eagle, the lanner falcon, and the rare eastern imperial eagle.

=== Geology ===
==== Landforms ====
The Mani is a peninsula with Cape Matapan forming its southern tip. The massif of the Taygetus range, about 100 km (62 mi) long, extends from the centre of the Peloponnese to Cape Matapan. The tallest mountain is Mount Taygetus. Its summit, Profitis Ilias (Προφήτης Ηλίας 'Prophet Elijah'), stands at 2,404 m (7,887 ft), and is the highest in the Peloponnese. Some historians identify Profitis Ilias with the "Taletum, a peak of Taygetus" mentioned by Pausanias.

==== Soils ====
The peninsula is composed of Mesozoic-era carbonate rocks, predominantly limestone, which erode to form karst caves such as the one at Alepotrypa. Shallow lithosols and rendzina soils, with a low capacity for holding water, dominate on limestone bedrock. Terra rossa (Italian for 'red soil'), a water-retentive, clayey soil with a deeper profile, is common in cultivated areas. Alluvial soils are found in river valleys, and saline soils in coastal environments. Due to erosion, the soils of Mani are at high risk of desertification.

=== Land cover and vegetation ===
Vegetation in the Mani occupies a range of natural, semi-natural and human-made habitats with a high diversity of species.

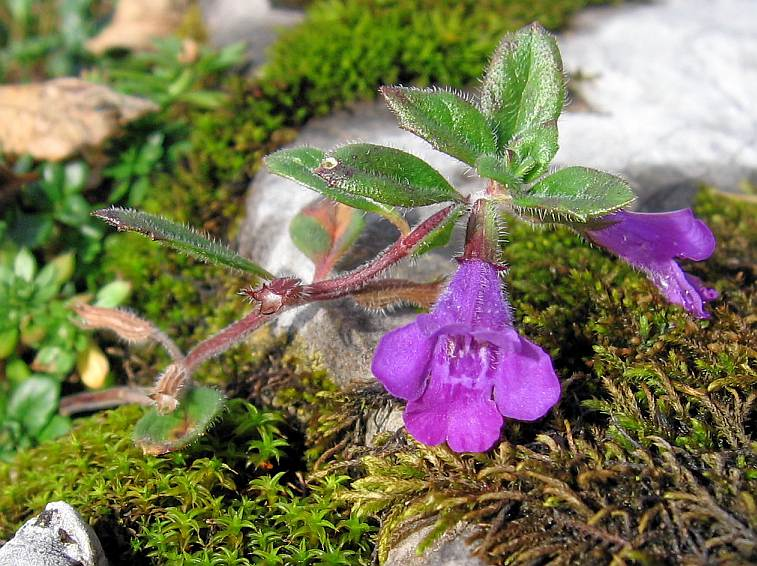
Rock thyme (Clinopodium alpinum) in an alpine plant community

Communities of low-growing alpine plants thrive above the tree line of the Taygetus range: examples are Clinopodium alpinum (rock thyme); Astragalus angustifolius (a species of milkvetch); and the rare Jurinea taygetea, an endemic species in the Jurinea genus. Montane forests dominated by Abies cephalonica (Greek fir) and Pinus nigra (European black pine) occur at moderate elevations. (Note: 800–1,800 m (2,600–5,900 ft).)

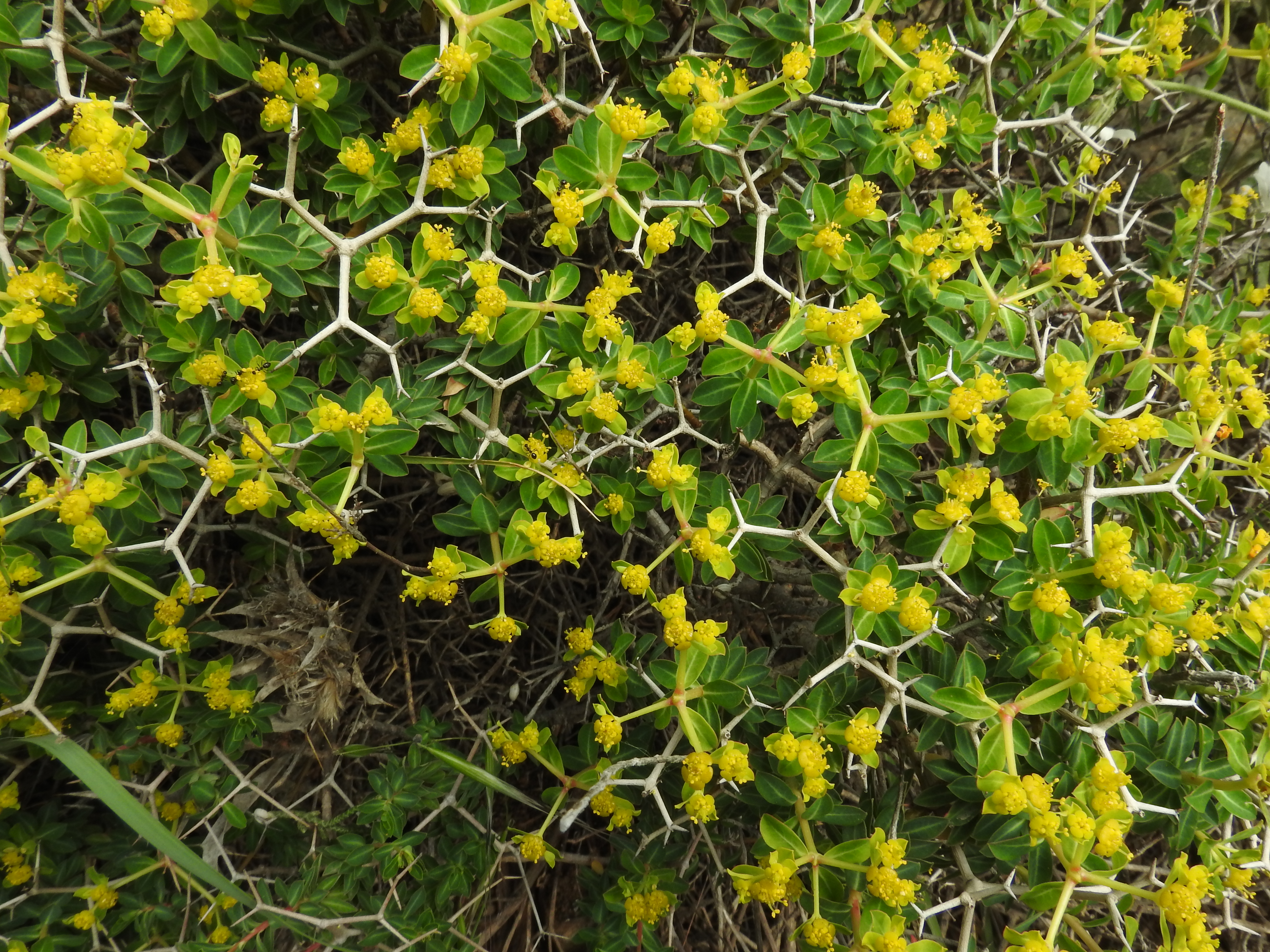
Greek spiny spurge (Euphorbia acanthothamnos), found in garrigue habitats

Maquis, a type of impenetrable scrubland made up of evergreen, hard-leaved shrubs about 1.5–3 m (5–10 ft) tall, is widespread on lower mountain slopes. Typical species are Arbutus unedo (strawberry tree), Pistacia lentiscus (mastic), Quercus coccifera (kermes oak), and Smilax aspera (a species of vine). Garrigue, a more open vegetation type, is also found over large areas at lower altitudes. This habitat features aromatic, shrubby plants, usually less than 1 m (3 ft) high, such as Sarcopoterium spinosum (spiny burnet), Euphorbia acanthothamnos (Greek spiny spurge), Thymus capitatus (conehead thyme), and Anthyllis hermanniae (lavender-leaved anthyllis). Olive groves on the lower slopes (often terraced) and in the coastal plain of Messenian Mani are mainly cultivated without the use of herbicides; the groves provide habitats for many spring-flowering annual plants.

The Vyros Gorge hosts several endemic species, including Lithodora zahnii of the genus Lithodora, and Thalictrum orientale (a type of meadow-rue).

Mani's rocky shores and sandy beaches, a specific habitat, feature plants such as Matthiola sinuata (sea stock), Limonium sinuatum (sea lavender), and Pancratium maritimum (sea daffodil). Posidonia oceanica (Neptune grass) is found offshore.

=== Wildlife ===
The Peloponnese is exceptional in its range and abundance of fauna, especially reptiles, and the Mani is one of several biodiversity hotspots within it.

==== Reptiles and amphibians ====
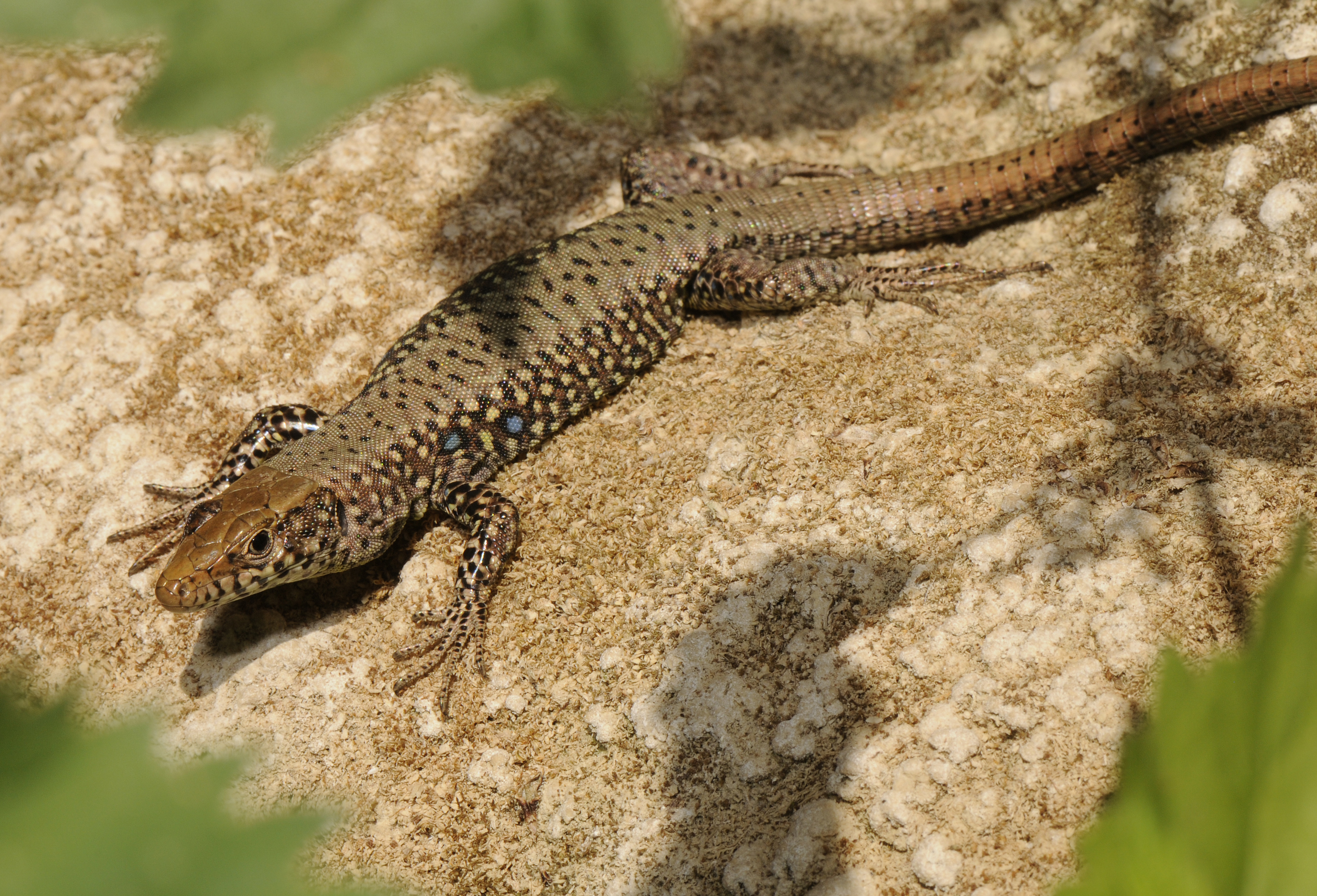
Greek rock lizard in basking stance

The marginated tortoise (Testudo marginata) is densely distributed throughout Mani; Hermann's tortoise (Testudo hermanni) is more rarely found.

Many types of lizard are found on dry-stone walls and in rocky areas, including the Greek rock lizard (Hellenolacerta graeca), Kotschy's gecko (Mediodactylus kotschyi), Peloponnese wall lizard (Podarcis peloponnesiacus), and European legless lizard (Pseudopus apodus). The Greek snake skink (Ophiomorus punctatissimus) is common in maquis.

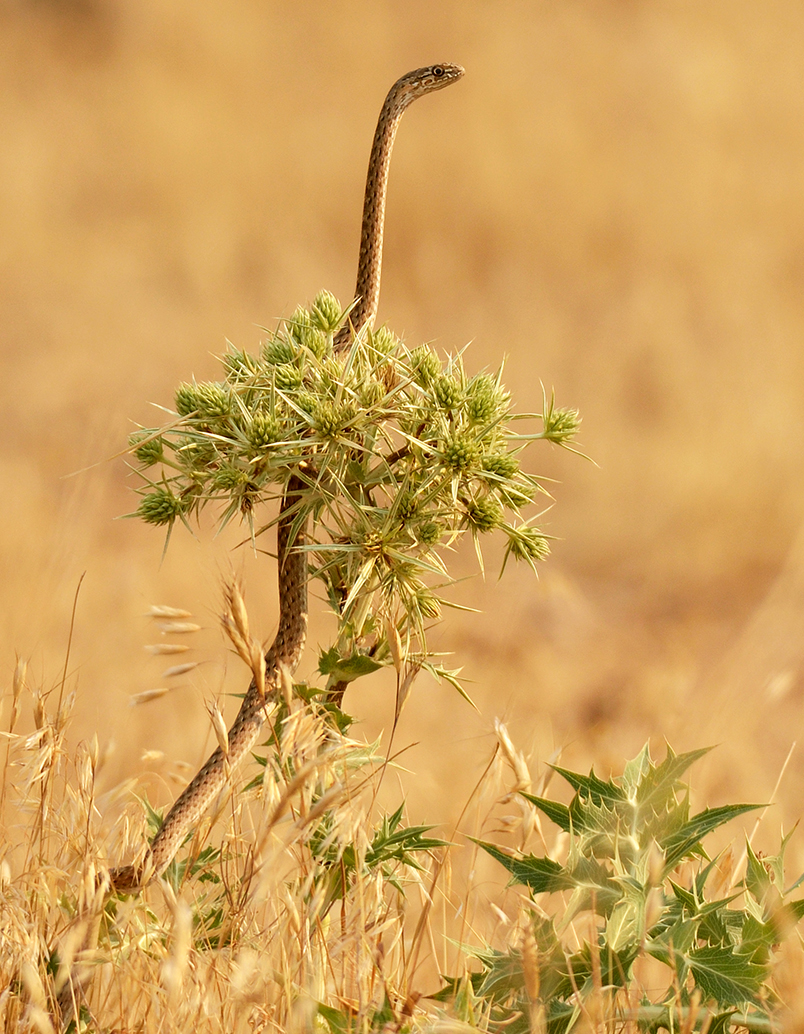
Eastern Montpellier snake in characteristic "periscope" hunting pose

Maquis and other habitats are frequented by snakes such as the venomous nose-horned viper (Vipera ammodytes meridionalis), European cat snake (Telescopus fallax), and eastern Montpellier snake (Malpolon insignitus). The burrowing Eurasian worm snake (Xerotyphlops vermicularis) is a regular prey of little owls (Athena noctua) in the spring.

The most widespread amphibian is the highly adaptable European green toad (Bufotes viridis), occurring in maquis, open forests, arid hilly areas, olive groves, beaches, on agricultural land, and in villages. The common toad (Bufo bufo), European tree frog (Hyla arborea), marsh frog (Pelophylax ridibundus), and Greek newt (Lissotriton graecus) occur in northeast Mani. The fire salamander (Salamandra salamandra) is found in mountainous areas in the north of the peninsula.

Several beaches near Gytheio – at Mavrovouni, Valtaki, and Selinitsa – are major nesting sites for loggerhead sea turtles (Caretta caretta).

==== Mammals ====
Wild boar (Sus scrofa), extinct in the Peloponnese by c. 1830, were reintroduced by hunting associations between 1988 and 2004, and recorded in many parts of Mani from 2000. Several incidents involving them – such as traffic accidents, attacks on people, and beach invasions – have been reported.

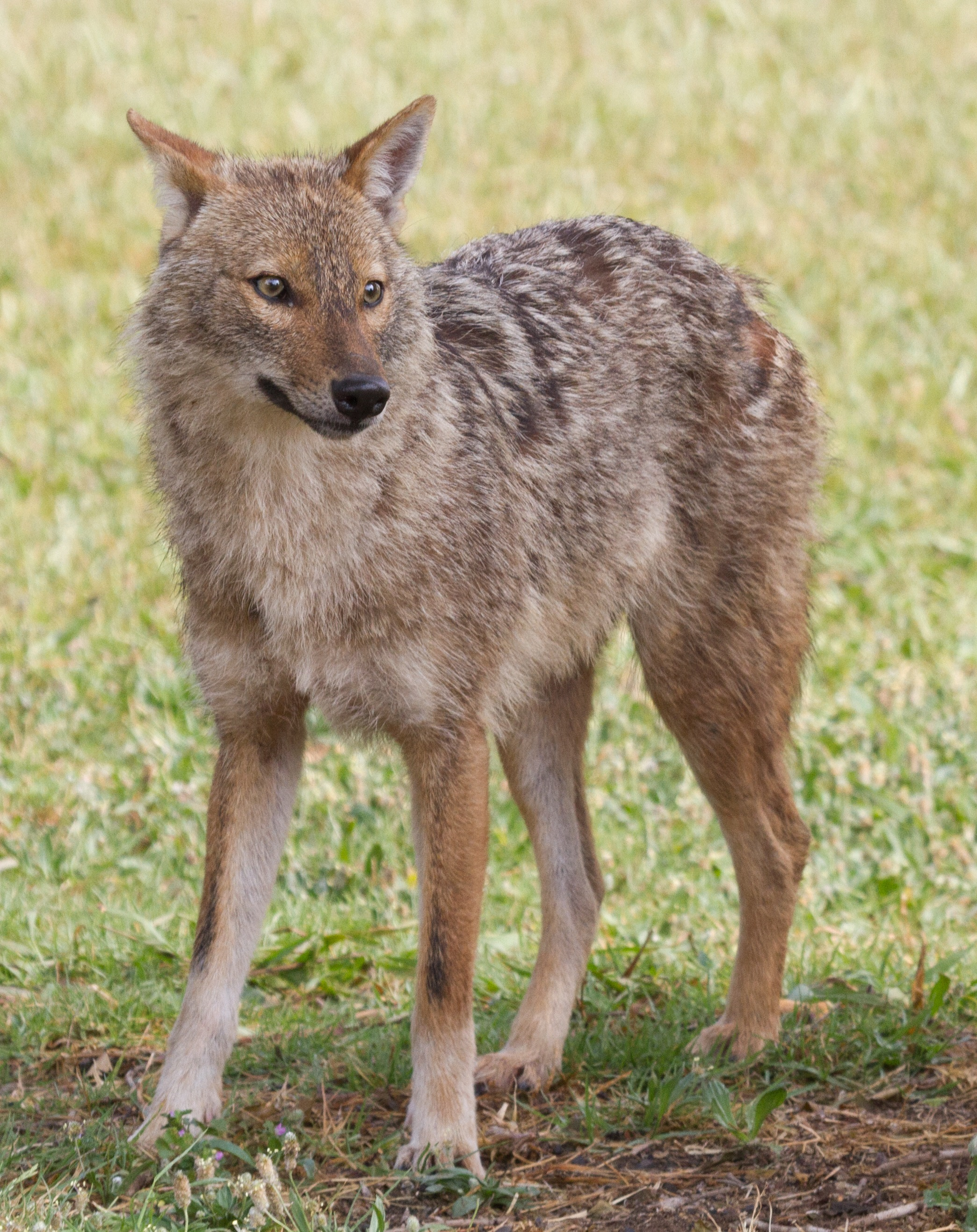
Golden jackal

Beech martens (Martes foina) are common around villages.

The population and distribution of the golden jackal (Canis aureus) in the Mani (and mainland Greece as a whole) has rapidly expanded since the early 21st century. This has been attributed to the species' high adaptability and capacity for colonizing human-dominated habitats, especially those with rough terrain.

The main bat species occurring in Mani are the greater horseshoe (Rhinolophus ferrumequinum), Mediterranean horseshoe (Rhinolophus euryale), lesser mouse-eared (Myotis blythii), Natterer's (Myotis nattereri), and Schreiber's (Miniopterus schreibersii). (Note: Other species recorded include the lesser horseshoe (Rhinolophus hipposideros), Blasius's horseshoe (Rhinolophus blasii), Geoffroy's (Myotis emarginatus), and serotine (Eptesicus serotinus).)

=== Climate ===
The Mani peninsula, like much of southern Greece, has a hot-summer Mediterranean climate (Köppen climate classification Csa) featuring mild to cool, wet winters and hot, dry summers. The Messenian, or Outer, Mani receives more rainfall than the Laconian, or Inner and Lower, Mani, which is in a rain shadow; as a consequence, Outer Mani is more agriculturally productive. Locals call Messenian Mani aposkiaderi 'shady' and Laconian Mani prosiliaki 'sunny'.

== Local government and services ==
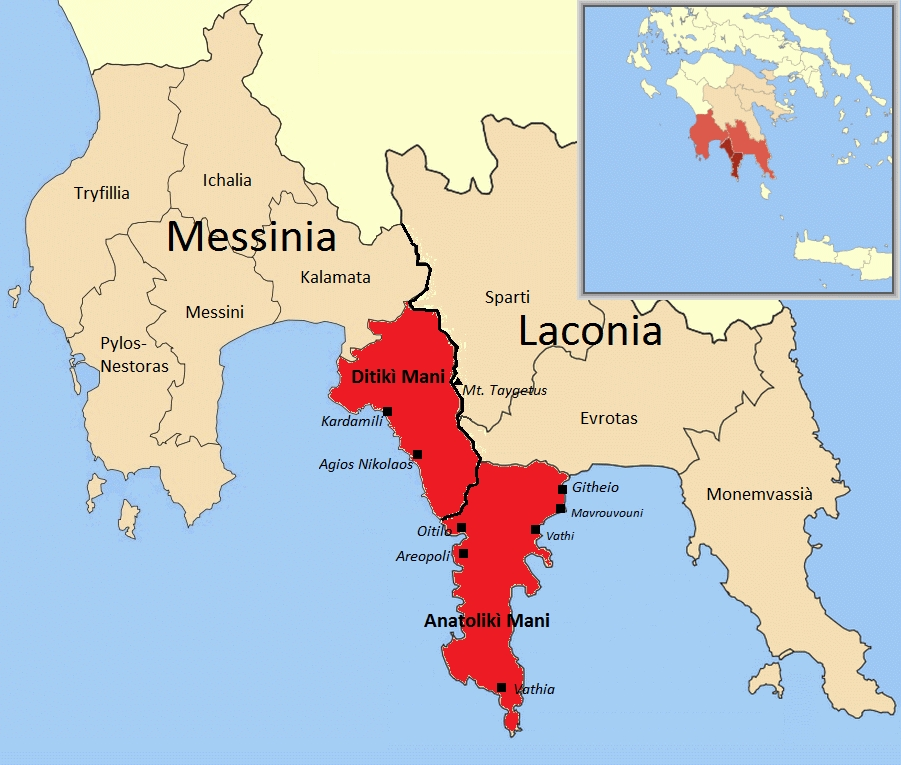
West Mani (Dytikí Máni) lies in Messenia, and East Mani (Anatolikí Máni) in Laconia.

Local government is provided by the municipalities of West Mani (Δυτική Μάνη, Dytikí Máni), and East Mani (Ανατολική Μάνη, Anatolikí Máni). Each municipality is headed by a mayor, who governs with the aid of a municipal council.

West Mani, with its administrative seat in Kardamyli, is part of the regional unit of Messenia; East Mani, whose administrative seat is Gytheio, is in Laconia.

Messenia and Laconia are within the Peloponnese administrative region.

=== Traditional regions ===
The three traditional regions of Mani are:

- Outer Mani (Έξω Μάνη, Exo Mani) in the northwest, corresponding approximately to West Mani;
- Lower Mani (Κάτω Μάνη, Kato Mani) in the east, corresponding approximately to northern East Mani;
- Inner Mani (Μέσα Μάνη, Mesa Mani) in the southwest, corresponding approximately to southern East Mani.

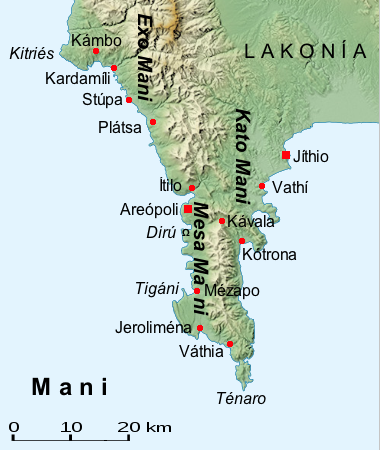
The traditional regions of Mani: Exo (Outer); Kato (Lower); Mesa (Inner)

Cranae, an island just off the coast of Gytheio in Lower Mani, was linked to the mainland by a causeway in 1898.

== Media ==
Local newspapers covering events in Mani include:

- Lakonikos, an online newspaper focused on Laconia;
- Messinia Press, an online newspaper with a section on West Mani;
- Notos Press, an online newspaper covering the Peloponnese Region;
- Θάρρος (Thárros 'Courage'), a daily print and online newspaper focused on Messenia, with a section on West Mani.

== Transport links ==
=== Roads ===
A winding road with coastal stretches links Kalamata, via Kampos, Kardamyli and Stoupa, to Oitylo, from where a cross-peninsular road runs northeast to Gytheio. From Oitylo, the road continues south towards Cape Matapan via Areopoli, Gerolimenas and Vatheia, looping back north to Gytheio along the east coast via Kokkala, Kotronas and Skoutari. Another cross-peninsular road runs southeast from Areopoli to Kotronas.

From Gytheio, National Road 39 (European route E961) runs north to Sparta. Gytheio can be reached from Kalamata from the north by using the toll road motorways A7 and A71; the A7 connects with National Road 39.

=== Paths ===
The Peloponnese section of the E4 European long-distance path runs via Sparta and Kastania to Gytheio in northeast Mani, and then continues, via ferry, in Crete.

=== Ferries ===
Ferries connect Gytheio to Kythera, Antikythera, Crete, and Piraeus, the port of Athens.

=== Airport ===
Kalamata International Airport is near Kalamata, which is adjacent to West Mani.

== Towns and settlements ==
=== Modern ===
- Agios Nikolaos
- Altomira
- Areopoli
- Avia
- Doloi
- Drosopigi
- Dryalos
- Gerolimenas
- Gytheio
- Kalyvia
- Kampos
- Kardamyli
- Kastania
- Kelefa
- Kipoula
- Koita
- Lefktro
- Mavrovouni
- Megali Mantineia
- Myrsini
- Oitylo
- Parasyros
- Petrovouni
- Porto Kagio
- Pyrgos Dirou
- Skoutari
- Sminos
- Stoupa
- Vatheia

=== Ancient ===
- Asine
- Caenepolis (or Kainepolis)
- Gerenia
- Gytheion, Gythium (modern Gytheio)
- Hippola
- Kardamyli
- Las
- Leuctra
- Messa
- Oetylus (modern Oitylo)
- Psamathus
- Pyrrichos
- Taenarum
- Teuthrone
- Thalamae

== Notable sites and features ==
- Alepotrypa Cave
- Apidima Cave
- Beaufort Castle
- Cape Matapan
- Diros Caves
- Grand Magne Castle
- Kalamakia Cave
- Kelefa Castle
- Monastery of Panayia Yiatrissa
- Mount Taygetus
- Passavas Castle
- Porto Kagio
- Temple of Poseidon at Tainaron
- Tigani Peninsula
- Vatheia
- Vyros Gorge
- Zarnata Castle

== History ==
=== Prehistory ===
==== Palaeolithic to Neolithic ====
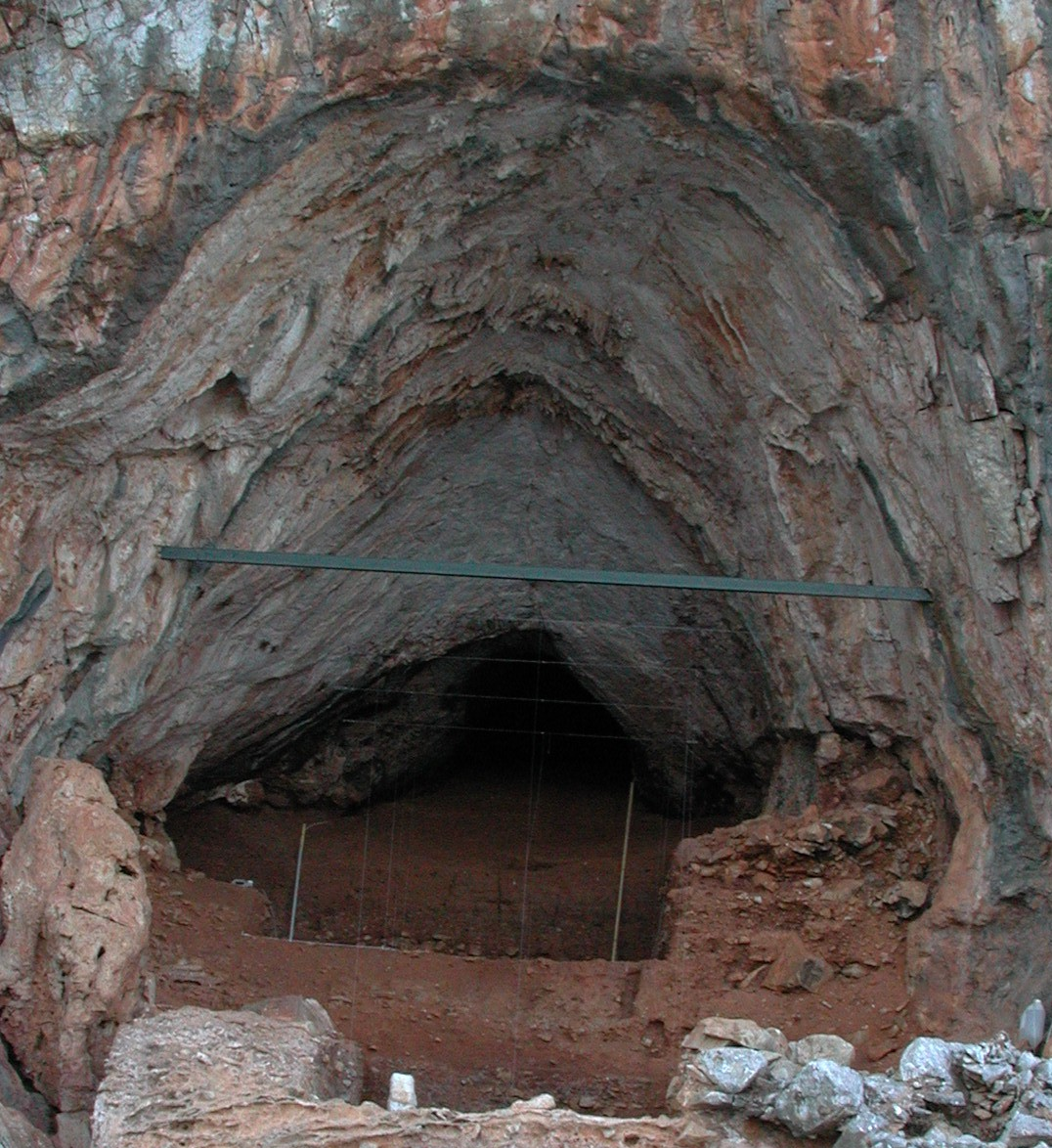
Excavations at Kalamakia Cave, a Neanderthal site

Mani has been inhabited since prehistoric times. The Apidima Cave on the west side of the peninsula has yielded Neanderthal and Homo sapiens fossils from the Palaeolithic era. As of 2019, a Homo sapiens skull recovered from Apidima, dating to at least 210,000 years before present, is the earliest evidence of modern humans in Europe. Neolithic remains have been found on Mani's coast in the Alepotrypa Cave, a major settlement, cemetery and ceremonial site, and human and Neanderthal remains in the Kalamakia Cave, a Middle Palaeolithic site. The Lakonis I site, a collapsed Middle Palaeolithic cave on the coast near Gytheio, contains evidence of Neanderthals' use of fire to dispose of bones and other food refuse.

Evidence of extensive Neolithic and early Bronze Age occupation and activity extending north and south of the Bay of Oitylo has been found at many other cave sites.

==== Mycenaean ====
The Mycenaean civilization (1900–1100 BC) dominated Mani and the Peloponnese in the Bronze Age. Mani flourished under the Mycenaeans. A temple dedicated to Apollo was erected at Cape Matapan. It was later re-dedicated as the Temple of Poseidon. Homer refers to a number of towns in the Mani region. The "Catalogue of Ships" in the Iliad names Messa, Oetylus, Kardamyli, Gerenia, Teuthrone, and Las. Mani features in many myths and legends, with one describing a sea-hollowed cavern near Cape Matapan (ancient Taenarum) as a portal to Hades, the underworld.

=== Ancient Mani ===
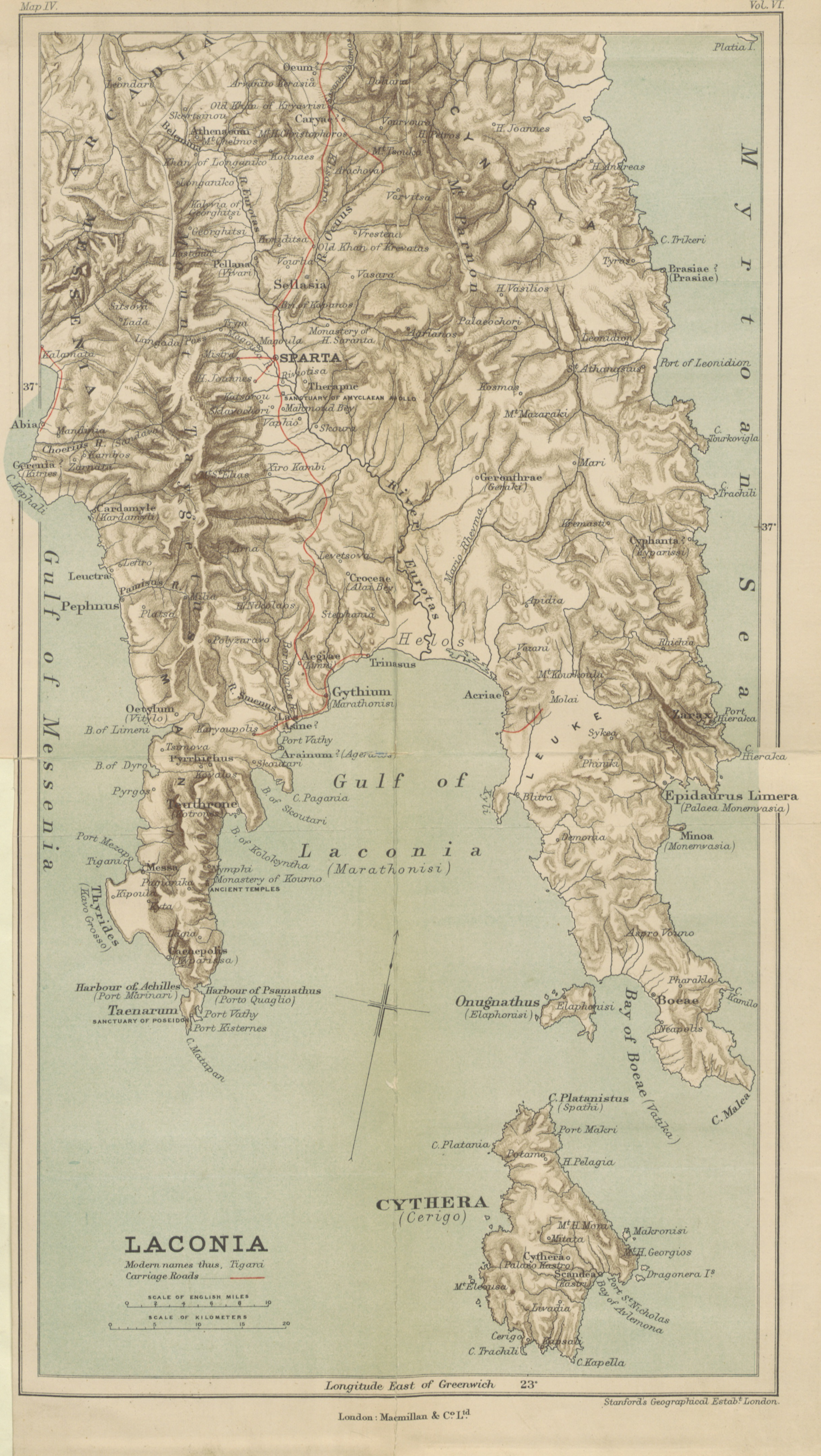
Mani (left peninsula) in ancient Laconia, showing settlements, natural features, and carriage roads (in red) mentioned by Pausanias in his Description of Greece, composed in the 2nd century AD. Modern names are in italic. This map is part of James Frazer's commentaries on his 1898 translation of the work.

==== Dark Ages ====
In the early Greek Dark Ages (c. 1050–800 BC), the inhabitants of Laconia were leading producers of Tyrian purple from the murex sea snail, still plentiful in the waters off Gytheio and Kythera. Production is thought to have been established by the Phoenicians.

==== Archaic ====
With the onset of the Archaic Period (c. 800–480 BC), Mani and much of the Peloponnese came under the sway of the powerful city-state of Sparta. Under Spartan rule, the inhabitants of Kardamyli, Thalamae, Gythium, and other poleis in Laconia and Messenia, were second-tier citizens known as perioikoi, 'those who dwell around'.

==== Classical ====
Gytheio, 27 km (17 mi) from Sparta, became Mani's – and Sparta's – major port. It was captured by Athenian forces in 455 BC during the First Peloponnesian War, a power struggle between Athens and Sparta and their respective allies.

The damaged city and docks were rebuilt; by the end of the war, Gytheio was the main shipyard for the new Spartan fleet. Spartan hegemony in the Peloponnese lasted until 371 BC, when the Thebans under Epaminondas defeated Sparta at the Battle of Leuctra.

==== Hellenistic ====
Throughout much of the Hellenistic period (323–30 BC), the Mani Peninsula remained subject to Spartan hegemony. This era proved turbulent for Mani and Laconia, marked by frequent military engagements and shifting political allegiances. Taenarum became a mercenary headquarters in the late 4th century.

Competition between rival powers resulted in a series of wars that eventually drew in the Kingdom of Macedon and the expanding Roman Republic: the Cleomenean War (229–222 BC); the Social War (220–217 BC); the Macedonian Wars (214–148 BC); and the Laconian War (195 BC). Gythium, as a major port, remained an especially sought-after prize for all parties.

In 218 BC, during the Social War, Philip V of Macedon invaded and overran Laconia. In the process, he laid waste the east coast of the Mani Peninsula as far south as Taenarum, though he failed to capture Asine. Reversing course northwards, he headed for Gythium, and then made for Helos and the Malea peninsula, which he devastated as far south as Boeae.

Nabis ascended to the Spartan throne in 207 BC; he expanded Gythium, transforming it into a naval base. Rome, allied with the Achaean League – a confederation of Sparta's Greek rivals – captured Gythium in 195 BC after a prolonged siege; Sparta was the next target of the allies. The Romans placed several coastal settlements, including Gythium and many others in Mani, under the protection of the Achaean League. Their inhabitants, formerly second-tier citizens of Sparta (periokoi), were known as Eleutherolakōnes (Ἐλευθερολάκωνες 'free Laconians').

Determined to retake Gythium, Nabis advanced on and recovered the port in 192 BC. The Romans soon recaptured it. Nabis was assassinated, and Sparta was incorporated, on lenient terms, in the Achaean League. In 189 BC, the Spartans, still seeking access to a port, seized Las, prompting the Achaeans to abolish the Spartan constitution, end social institutions such as the education and training system (agōgē) and mess halls, and absorb Sparta outright.

==== Roman ====
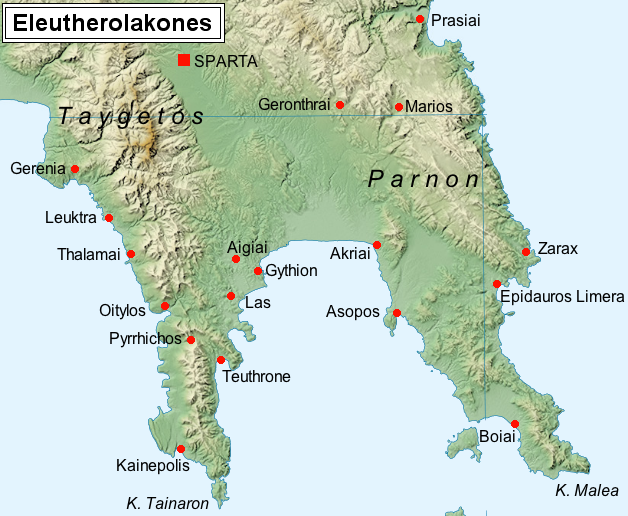
According to Pausanias, a Greek geographer writing in the 2nd century AD, the Free Laconians had 18 cities; most were coastal settlements in the Mani Peninsula.

With the victory of the Romans over Corinth and the Achaean League at the Battle of Corinth in 146 BC, all of Greece became part of their empire. The Peloponnese was administered as the province of Achaia. The Eleutherolakōnes were allowed to unite to form a Lacedaemonian League. In 21 BC, under Augustus, the first Roman emperor, this became the League of Free Laconians. In 375 AD, a massive earthquake devastated Gythium and submerged much of its ruins under the sea.

In 395 AD, mainland Greece and the Peloponnese became part of the Byzantine Empire (also known as the Eastern Roman Empire), bringing over 500 years of centralized rule from Rome to an end. Mani would nominally be administered by the new government in Constantinople for over a millennium, with periodic interruptions due to unrest and foreign invasions. Mani's remoteness would limit Constantinople's influence.

=== Middle Ages ===
==== Byzantine rule ====
The Mani Peninsula had a turbulent history during the long period of Byzantine Greece (395–1453), as various powers fought over it and the whole Peloponnese (known for much of this time as "Morea"). Between 396 and 397, the Visigoths under Alaric I raided the Peloponnese. According to Procopius, a Greek historian writing in the 6th century, the Vandals under Gaiseric (r. 428–477) unsuccessfully assaulted Taenarum.

In the late 6th century, Avars and Slavs invaded Greece, reaching much of the Peloponnese. The chronology, extent, and duration of invasions and subsequent occupations, the reliability of written, (Note: The principal written source is the medieval Chronicle of Monemvasia, whose reliability is questioned by many scholars.) toponymic and archaeological evidence, the pace of Byzantine recovery, and the degree of lasting cultural influence, are all topics of academic dispute. The particular theory of Fallmerayer, a 19th-century German historian, that Avar, Slavic, and other peoples replaced the Greek population of the Peloponnese in this period has been tested by the genetic analysis of samples of modern populations: a 2017 paper found that "Peloponneseans are clearly distinguishable from the populations of the Slavic homeland and are very similar to Sicilians and Italians".

Over the subsequent centuries, Mani was fought over by the Byzantines, the French, and the Saracens. In the wake of the Early Muslim conquests, Arabs captured the island of Crete in the 820s and established an emirate there. Arab pirates then began to raid Mani and the coastal cities of the Peloponnese; this ceased when the Byzantines retook Crete in 961.

===== Christianization =====
By the middle of the 6th century, mainland Greece was largely Christianized: there were nearly 60 episcopal sees, with a large concentration in the Province of Achaia, of which Mani was a part. Around 950, Emperor Constantine VII wrote a manual of statecraft in which he mentions that Mani had remained pagan till the reign of his grandfather, Basil I, who ruled in the late 9th century.

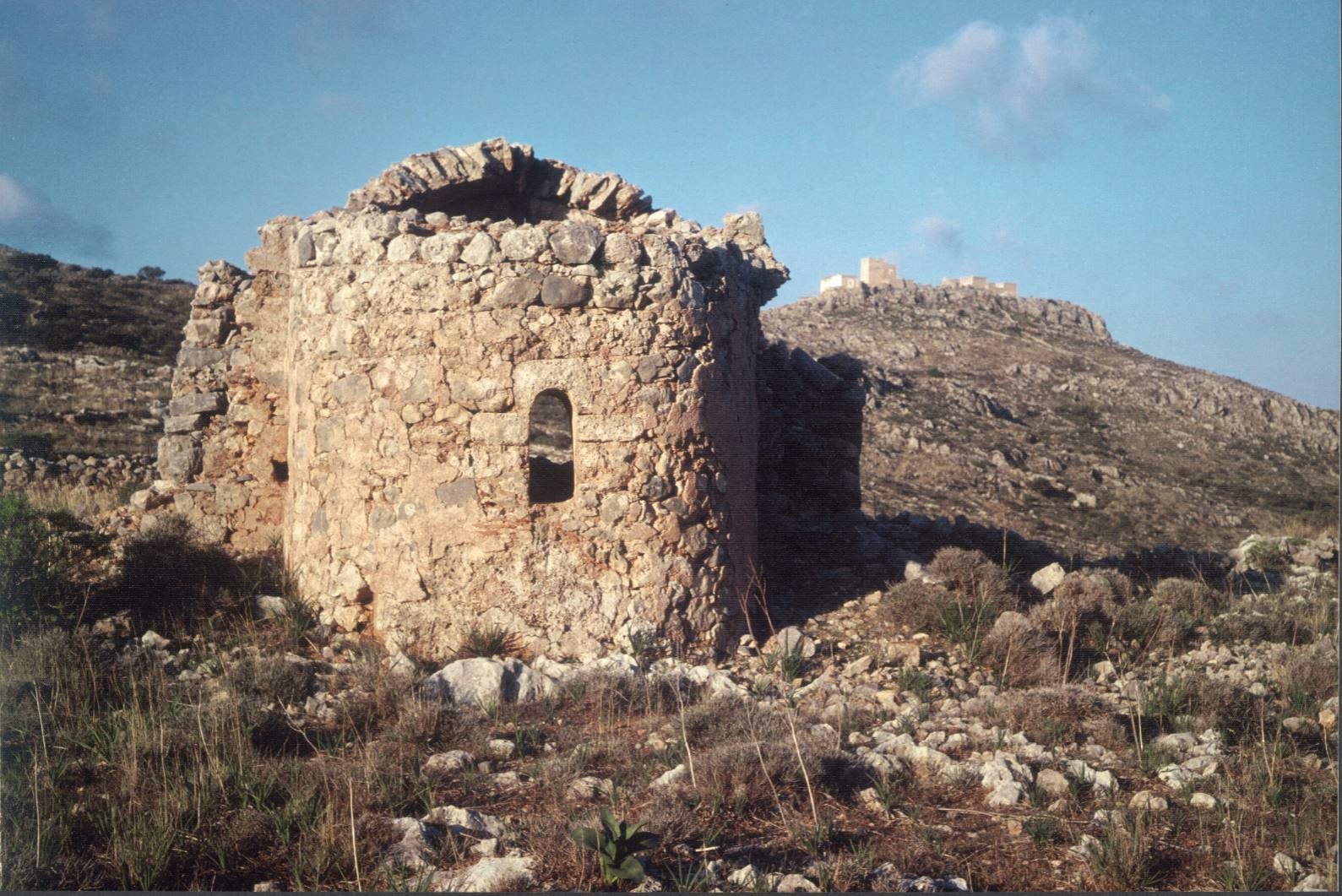
The 9th-century church of St. Prokopios (Άγιος Προκόπιος) near Koita (visible on the brow of the hill), viewed from the east

According to Seifried (2021), Constantine's statement, cited in the works of modern historians, (Note: Seifried mentions, as an example, George Finlay's seminal A History of Greece from its Conquest by the Romans to the Present Time, B.C. 146 to A.D. 1864 (1877), where Finlay, referring to Constantine's text, states: "The ignorant condition of the lower orders, and particularly of the rural population, explains the curious fact, that paganism continued to exist in the mountains of Greece as late as the reign of [Basil], when the Mainates of Mount Taygetus were at last converted to Christianity." (vol. 1, p. 424).) led archaeologists conducting the initial studies of Mani's Byzantine churches to mistakenly conclude that the earliest were built in the 10th century. Seifried considers that because archaeological research undertaken since the 1960s into churches in southern Mani has tentatively dated several to the Early Byzantine period (330–717), the process of Christianization can be pushed as far back as the 5th century. (Note: Referring to the initial studies, which were undertaken in the first half of the 20th century, Seifried cites research by Ramsay Traquair and Peter Megaw. Regarding later research, she draws particular attention to the work of the archaeologists Nikolaos Drandakis and Angeliki Mexia.) Seifried notes that the pace of church building in Mani increased between the 10th and 15th centuries, with an average of 35 built per century compared to two per century in the Early Byzantine years.

Concerning the possible role of St. Nikon in Mani's Christianization – he was active as a missionary in mainland Greece from the mid-960s – Curta (2011) states that "In Peloponnesos, Nikon does not appear to have been concerned with the conversion of anyone, either Greek or Slav."

==== Crusader states ====
After the Sack of Constantinople in 1204 during the Fourth Crusade, the Mani Peninsula became part of the Principality of Achaea (1205–1432), a Crusader state, though it retained a degree of autonomy due to its largely inaccessible mountain terrain. In c. 1220, Jean de Nully, a French knight, was appointed to the Barony of Passavant, the last of Achaea's baronies to be established. His castle of Passavas overlooked the route from Gytheio to Tsimova (modern Areopoli).

The Melingoi, a Slavic tribe, had settled on the western side of the Taygetus between the 6th and 9th centuries. Living in fortified settlements in northwest Mani, they followed a pastoral, transhumant way of life, moving their livestock to pastures up and down the mountain range according to the season. The Greek-text version of the Chronicle of Morea describes how William of Villehardouin, the fourth prince of Achaea (r. 1246–1278), built the three castles of Mystras, Grand Magne, and Beaufort in order to control them. The Chronicle recounts that under a treaty between the Melingoi and William, the former undertook to provide military assistance to the latter in lieu of taxes and corvée. The Melingoi maintained an independent existence at least until the 14th century, converting to Christianity and serving the Byzantines.

By the mid-13th century, the resurgence of the Byzantine Empire under the Palaiologos dynasty had shifted the balance of power in Greece. In the 1250s the Pope appointed a "Latin," i.e., Roman Catholic, bishop to Mani, provoking resentment among the Orthodox Greeks, who soon removed him. In 1259, Byzantine forces captured Prince William at the Battle of Pelagonia. In 1262, William surrendered three fortresses to Emperor Michael VIII to obtain his release: Mystras, Grand Magne, and Monemvasia.

==== Byzantine Despotate ====
Maniots had maintained a significant degree of autonomy during the Principality of Achaea's existence. From the mid-14th to mid-15th centuries, control over the region gradually shifted to a semi-autonomous province of the Byzantine Empire called the Despotate of the Morea (1349–1460), when successive despotes governed the province.

=== Ottoman rule ===
In 1453, the Ottoman Empire besieged and captured Constantinople; by 1460, the Ottomans had completed their conquest of the Morea. (Note: The Peloponnese was called Morea throughout the early modern period.)

The Ottomans remained nominal rulers of Mani until the outbreak of the Greek War of Independence in 1821, with a brief interlude of Venetian control. Mani was first administered by the Ottoman Eyalet of the Archipelago, and then by the Morea Eyalet. As an area with a challenging topography, a demanding environment, and on the margins of the empire, imperial control of Mani was limited; this allowed some local independence in determining social structures and political arrangements.

==== Ottoman-Venetian wars ====
The Ottoman Empire and the Republic of Venice frequently clashed over control of the Morea, with the Mani Peninsula emerging as a major site of contestation during a series of conflicts that began in 1396 – about sixty years before the Ottoman conquest of Greece – and ended in 1718. A significant shift in the balance of power occurred with the Treaty of Constantinople (1479), a Venetian-Ottoman peace settlement ending the First Ottoman–Venetian War, which had begun in 1463. The treaty restored territorial boundaries to their pre-1463 status. This meant that lands held by Greek rebels under Venetian protection returned to Ottoman control, including the Mani Peninsula.

Krokodeilos Kladas (1425–1490) had led bands of warriors called stratioti against the Ottoman Empire, with Venice providing support. He contested the outcome of the 1479 treaty, and led a group of Albanians, together with stratioti from the Venetian territories, in a revolt against the Ottomans in the Mani. This rebellion strained relations between Venice and the Ottoman Empire, with disputes over who was responsible for the activities of the insurgents. Hoping to avoid another war, both Venetians and Ottomans put a bounty on Kladas. After initial successes, in 1480 an Ottoman army drove him to take refuge in the fortress of Kastania, from where he escaped, with fifty men, on ships sent by King Ferdinand of Naples.

Around 1568, the Ottomans built a small castle to defend the harbour of Porto Kagio, which they were using as a base for galleys patrolling the Kythira Strait between the Peloponnese and Crete. They abandoned it in 1570 after a Venetian attack. Certain 17th- and 18th-century cartographers refer to the castle as "Maina"; some later authors identified this as the 13th-century Grand Magne, though medieval portolan charts do not show a castle there.

==== 1612 Ottoman incursion ====
In 1612, the Mani Peninsula became the focal point of another Ottoman military incursion, this time triggered by the actions of Charles Gonzaga (1580–1637), who claimed descent from the Palaiologos dynasty. Charles sought to establish a new Byzantine state with himself as emperor in Constantinople, viewing his endeavor as a new crusade. The Maniots caught wind of Charles's ambitions and negotiated an alliance, with church leaders addressing him as "Constantine Palaeologus".

On discovering Charles's plans and the Maniots' support, the Ottoman authorities launched a large-scale punitive expedition, with a force of 20,000 soldiers and 70 ships deployed to invade Mani. The Ottomans devastated the peninsula and imposed punishing taxes on the Greeks. Charles's further attempts at his crusade failed, and he later became Duke of Mantua and Montferrat. His failure left the Maniots to continue their struggle against the Ottomans without external support. The Maniots' resistance remained a persistent challenge to Ottoman authority.

==== Migrations to Corsica ====
In October 1675, some 730 Maniots fleeing Ottoman rule embarked from Oitylo on a Genoese ship for Corsica, which was then Genoese territory. After a short stop in Genoa, they arrived in Corsica in March 1676, eventually settling in the area of Paomia (modern Cargèse). These settlers, led by the Stephanopoulos family and accompanied by clergy, were the first wave of a significant Greek migration to the island. A lengthy process of assimilation lasted well into the 20th century.

==== Beys of Mani ====
In the late 17th century, the Ottomans began appointing Maniot chieftains, designated beys, to rule Mani on their behalf. The rule of the Beys of Mani ended with the onset of the Greek War of Independence in 1821.

The first such bey was the Maniot Limberakis Gerakaris (c. 1644 – 1710), installed c. 1669. A former galley oarsman in the Venetian navy who became a pirate, he was captured by the Ottomans and condemned to death. The grand vizier pardoned him on condition that he manage Mani as a vassal state.

Limberakis accepted the offer. He used his new position to persecute the Stephanopoulos clan of Oitylo, with whom he had been feuding. During his rule, he alternated allegiance between the Republic of Venice and the Ottomans. Limberakis eventually fell out of favour with the Turks, and was captured by Ottoman forces in 1682. Another bey was not appointed for over a century.

==== Venetian conquest and withdrawal ====
With the Ottomans preoccupied with their wars against the Habsburgs, the Venetians saw an opportunity to seize Turkish-held territories in the Peloponnese, sparking the Morean War of 1684–1699. This was the sixth Ottoman–Venetian war and part of the wider conflict known as the "Great Turkish War". Military operations ranged across southeastern Europe and the Aegean; the war's major campaign was the Venetian conquest of the Morea.

The Battle of Kalamata in 1685 ended with a Venetian victory. Venice went on to conquer the Mani Peninsula, solidifying their foothold in the southern Morea. The Venetians took their first census of the entire Morea in 1689, estimating the Maniot population (who refused to be counted) at 16,000 to 18,000. Venice's expansionist revival would be short-lived, as its gains were reversed by the Ottomans in 1718.

==== Russian influence and Orlov revolt ====
The Ottomans faced a rival to the east in an expansionist Russia – the Tsardom and subsequent Empire. After an initial era of conflict via proxies, a series of Russo-Turkish wars began in 1568 (and continued, intermittently, till 1918). In the 18th century, the confrontation between the two empires spilled over into Mani.

By the late 17th century, Russian influence was spreading among Maniots and other Christians under Ottoman rule. Prophecies began circulating in the 1690s, at the height of the third Russo–Turkish War, of a "blonde nation" that would destroy the Ottoman Empire. This hope was fueled by the war and by Greek Orthodox patriarchs seeking Russian support to regain privileges lost in an earlier Franco-Ottoman alliance. From 1700 onwards, the presence of a Russian ambassador at the Ottoman court enabled direct contacts between Russian officials and Ottoman Christians, who began to seek refuge in Russia. These included Greek refugees, who established communities there.

In the mid-1760s, wishing to weaken the Ottoman Empire and establish a pro-Russian, independent Greek state, Russia sent emissaries to Mani to enlist local military leaders; at the same time, notable Greeks approached Russian agents to discuss plans for the liberation of Greece. Russian artillery captain Grigorios Papadopoulos, (Note: Or Georgios Papasoğlu.) a Greek, was dispatched to Mani. Georgios Papazolis, another Greek officer in the Russian army, cooperated with the brothers Grigory and Count Alexei Orlov in preparing a Greek insurrection in the Morea during Russian military operations against the Ottoman Empire in 1769. The organization of the rebellion was charged to the Orlov brothers, with Alexei as fleet commander.

With the onset of the Russo-Turkish War of 1768–1774 (the sixth conflict between the empires), Russia saw an opportunity to seize territory from its Ottoman rival. Aiming to weaken the Ottomans from within, Russia planned to incite Orthodox Christians to revolt, and sent agents to strategic points in the Balkans and Greece, including the Morea. Another Orlov brother, Fyodor, was sent to coordinate rebels there, as, due to its ports, it was deemed the most important strategic area of mainland Greece. The Greeks prepared to revolt in the expectation of massive Russian aid.

Russia assembled a war fleet that landed Fyodor Orlov at Kalamata in February 1770. This expedition of four ships, a few hundred soldiers, and paltry arms supplies, greatly disappointed the Greeks. Nevertheless, Orlov's arrival in Mani sparked a Maniot uprising, the Orlov revolt. An initial force of 1,400 men was raised, and organized into "legions" with the help of Russian officers. The Greek rebels were at first successful, defeating Ottoman forces in Laconia and eastern Messenia. They captured the fortress of Mystras and established a local government there, but the revolt failed to spread effectively.

The Ottomans responded with an invasion force, and by June 1770 the revolt had been suppressed, three months after it had begun. The Ottomans' Albanian troops massacred Greek civilians and destroyed property. After several years of plundering, they were curbed by Turkish troops, and order restored, in 1779.

==== French influence and Ottoman invasions ====
After the failed revolt of 1770, the Ottomans sought to control Mani through the appointment of a new bey. In 1784, Tzanetos Grigorakis from the powerful Grigorakis clan was induced to accept the position. In 1798, the Ottomans learned he was conspiring with French agents sent by Napoleon to orchestrate a revolt, and deposed him in favour of Panagiotis Koumoundouros.

In 1803, the Ottomans discovered that Grigorakis had received a shipment of arms from the French, and resolved to eliminate him. During the Ottoman invasion of Mani that same year, the Kapudan Pasha, the grand admiral of the Ottoman navy, led a large force into Mani. His army set up base at Gytheio, directly across from Grigorakis's fortified home on the island of Marathonisi. The Ottoman fleet blockaded the island, and their artillery inflicted significant damage. After a brief siege, Grigorakis, with his sons and followers, slipped out of the fort during the night and fled inland.

During the 1803 invasion, the Ottomans removed bey Panagiotis Koumoundouros because he had allowed Tzanetos Grigorakis to receive arms from the French. They replaced him with Antony Grigorakis, a cousin of Tzanetos. The Ottomans invaded Mani in 1807 and again in 1815; they were repulsed each time.

In 1810, bey Antony Grigorakis resigned in favour of his son-in-law, Konstantis Zervakos. The Maniots were hostile to Zervakos, and drove him out. That same year, clan chiefs assembled in Gytheio and elected Thodoros Zanetakis, nephew of Tzanetos Grigorakis, as their leader. During the 1815 Ottoman invasion of Mani, Zanetakis was removed from power and replaced by Petros Mavromichalis. Known as "Petrobey", he was the first bey from Mesa Mani (Inner Mani). In 1819, he joined the Filiki Eteria, a 19th-century Greek secret society opposing Ottoman rule, which by 1821 was prepared to revolt.

Bands of brigands known as klephts (κλέφτες 'thieves'), led by kapetánioi (καπετάνιοι 'captains'), had been operating in mountainous areas of Greece for generations. They were countered by the Ottomans with groups of irregular soldiers or militia known as armatoloi (αρματολοί). Many armatoloi were former klephts granted amnesty in return for serving the Ottoman authorities. Roles became blurred over time, and a change from brigand to militiaman, or militiaman to brigand, was common for captains and their bands. Their armed formations would form the backbone of Greek forces in the coming War of Independence.

=== Modern Greece ===
==== Greek War of Independence ====
On 17 March 1821, 12,000 Maniots gathered in Areopoli and declared war against the Ottoman Empire, an act which preceded the rest of Greece by about a week. The secret society of Filiki Eteria had sent representatives to organize the Maniots. From his base in Kalamata, Maniot leader Petros Mavromichalis titled himself "Commander in Chief of the Spartan Forces" and wrote letters to European heads of state announcing the Greek revolution. He then directed Maniot forces to attack Turkish positions in Messenia and Laconia. On 23 September 1821, after a long siege, Maniot fighters were part of the Greek forces under Theodoros Kolokotronis that captured and sacked the Ottoman regional capital, Tripolitsa.

===== Egyptian invasion =====
In 1825, with the Greek revolution faltering, Ottoman Sultan Mahmud II enlisted the help of Muhammad Ali of Egypt to subdue it. Ali's son, Ibrahim Pasha, landed at Methoni with a large force and quickly recaptured much of the Peloponnese, but was unable to take Nafplio and the Mani.

In 1826, Ibrahim's forces launched a two-pronged attack on the Mani in a joint Ottoman–Egyptian invasion. In June, at the Battle of Verga just southeast of Kalamata, 2,000 to 4,000 Maniots – numbers grew as the three-day battle wore on – together with warriors and refugees from other parts of Greece, successfully defended a fortified wall, repelling the Egyptian advance. Simultaneously, an Egyptian fleet landed an army at the Bay of Diros near Areopoli, aiming to capture the town and disrupt Maniot communications. The troops, initially contained by local women and elderly men armed with sickles and stones, were attacked by 1,000 Maniot fighters, suffered heavy losses, and forced to retreat.

==== Republic and kingdom ====
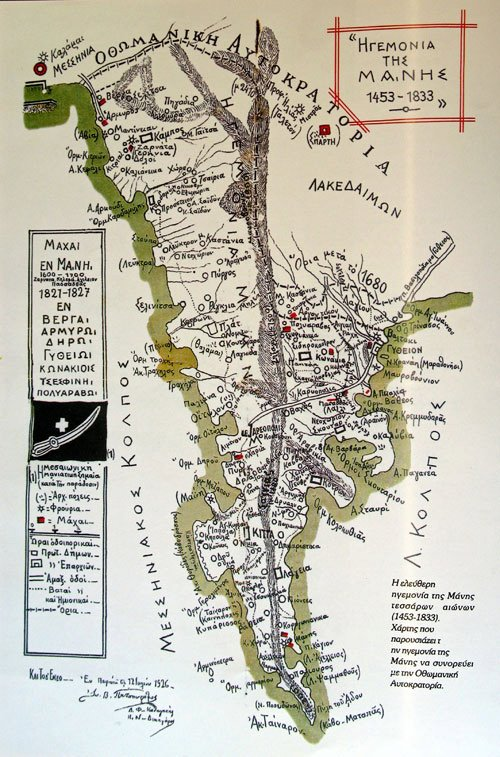
Map of Mani published in 1926

===== Assassination of Kapodistrias =====
After Ioannis Kapodistrias became the first governor of Greece in 1831, he came into conflict with the Mavromichalis clan, as the Maniots refused to pay taxes to the new government. Kapodistrias arrested and imprisoned Tzanis Mavromichalis, the brother of Maniot leader Petros Mavromichalis. Subsequently, Petros was also arrested and charged with treason.

On 27 September 1831, in retaliation for Petros's arrest, Petros's brother, Konstantinos Mavromichalis, and his brother's son, Georgios Mavromichalis, assassinated Kapodistrias as he was entering a church in Nafplio. Konstantinos was killed by Kapodistrias's bodyguard, and Georgios was later executed.

===== Monarchy and subjugation =====
In 1833, Otto von Wittelsbach was appointed King of Greece. His Council of Regency took action to subdue the Maniots and dismantle their defensive towers. In 1870, a Maniot vendetta was halted by the efforts of a regular army with artillery support.

==== World War II, civil war, and reconstruction ====
The violence of World War II in the Balkans and the Greek Civil War that followed severely affected the region and engulfed the Peloponnese and Mani. The Axis occupation of Greece and the ensuing conflicts brought widespread hardship. Mani was devastated by the wars, and many of its young people left for Athens or to join the Greek diaspora in the United States and Australia.

Fascist Italy invaded Greece in October 1940, starting the Greco-Italian War. The Italians soon encountered major difficulties and turned to Nazi Germany for assistance. Germany invaded Greece in April 1941. The Axis occupation lasted from 1941 to 1944.

In Mani, the British had begun to evacuate their troops from Porto Kagio ahead of the 1941 German invasion. During the occupation, Mani became a stronghold for the Security Battalions, Greek collaborationist paramilitary groups formed to support the German and Italian occupation troops. With the end of the occupation in 1944, Greece began to slide into the 1946–1949 civil war.

Mani's population declined and continued to fall as emigration continued beyond the post-war decades. Mani was considered a backwater until the 1970s, when the government started to build roads which made the peninsula more accessible by car. A tourist industry took hold, with ensuing population and economic growth.

==== Wildfires ====
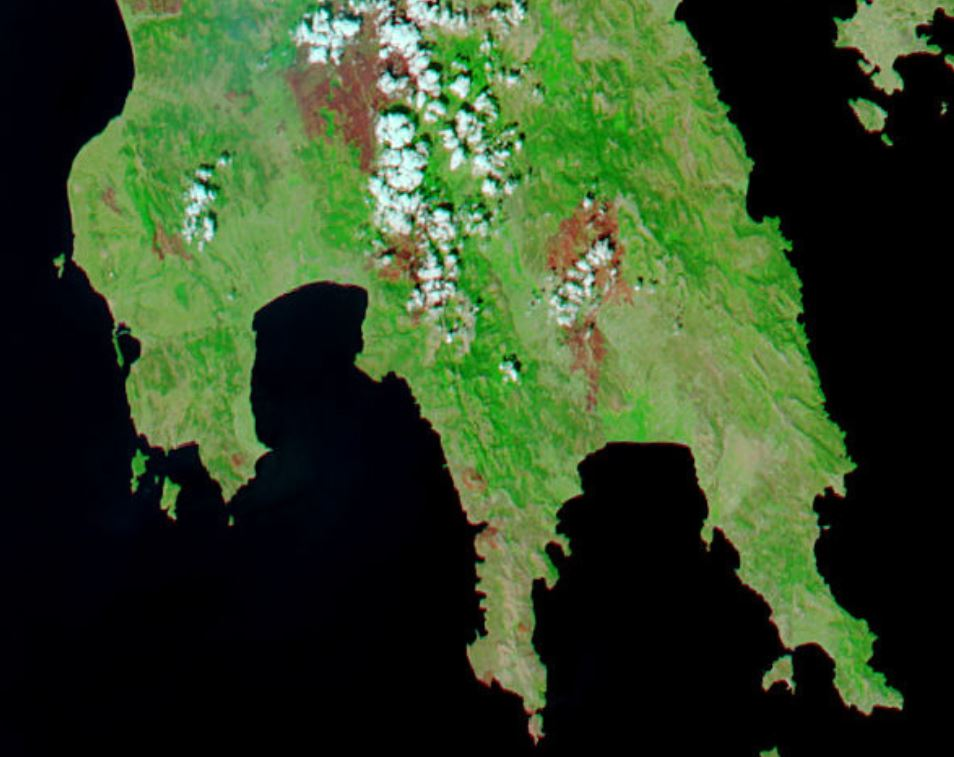
This NASA satellite image shows the impact of the 2007 wildfires, with vegetation displayed in bright green, and burnt areas in red; Mani is the central peninsula.

In 2007, widespread wildfires caused significant damage and loss of life in Mani, particularly around Areopoli. Wildfires in 2021 again devastated much of the Peloponnese: East Mani was badly affected, with an area of 105 km^{2} (41 mi^{2}) burnt.

==== Administrative reform ====
The municipalities of East Mani and West Mani were established in 2011 by the Kallikratis Programme, a sweeping administrative reform that resulted in mergers of regional and local governments in the Peloponnese and across Greece.

== Economy ==
=== Modern ===
Mani's economy is oriented towards agriculture, maritime activity, and tourism.

Tourism started to develop in the early 1960s. At the time, there were a few hotels in Gytheio, and inns in Gerolimenas, Kotronas, and other centres of economic activity. By the early 1990s, the number of hotels, restaurants, and cafés had increased considerably and they had become widely distributed, with some holiday resorts emerging. Over this three-decade period, the demand for workers for non-agricultural activities grew: concomitantly, sheep and goat rearing declined in economic importance, cotton production ceased, and wheat production diminished. Citrus, probably introduced around 1960, became widely grown, and olive cultivation increased, dominating agricultural labour requirements. The cultivation of garden vegetables rose in many communities, stimulated by the demands of the tourist industry.

==== Sea salt production ====
Many Maniots were engaged in producing sea salt in the 19th and early 20th centuries, largely on the west coast of the peninsula. There were four types of salt harvesting or production sites: natural salt pans formed in existing rock depressions along the shore (sites near Gerolimenas and Mezapos, for example); small artificial evaporation ponds excavated above sea level (such as a site near Artsi); large artificial ponds with associated temporary housing for workers (near Koukouri); and major saltworks built with significant technical infrastructure and permanent worker accommodation (on the Tigani peninsula). Salt was traded for foodstuffs such as barley, wheat, maize, cheese, and dried figs.

=== Early modern ===
According to Wagstaff (1965), the economy of Mani for the period c. 1680 – c. 1840 can be reconstructed in outline by analysing the travelogues of west European writers, though he points out that apart from one source, (Note: Wagstaff refers to volume 1 of W. M. Leake's three-volume Travels in the Morea (1830), citing observations and statistics in chapters 7, 8 and 9.) their accounts are descriptive, patchy, and do not cover the whole peninsula.

Wheat, barley, and sorghum were widely cultivated, and maize grown in water-retentive soils. In the early 19th century, olive oil was produced in large quantities north of Oitylo; cultivation further south became extensive some decades later. Lupins are mentioned as a crop cultivated in rotation with barley and wheat. The production of beans and chickpeas was enough, in abundant years, to support exports to Italy. Pigs (feeding on lupins) were probably reared more than cattle; sheep and goats are not mentioned in travellers' descriptions, "possibly because they were being grazed away from the main routes".

Exports included honey and beeswax, quails, olive oil, and two products extracted from the holm-oak: from its acorn-cups, a substance known as valonea, used in tanning; and from its galls, prinokoki (πρινόκοκκοι), a scarlet dye. Some cloth was produced from wool or cotton, and one account mentions a small export trade. The plantations of mulberry trees observed in the northeast, including near Skoutari, were the basis of a silk industry.

==== Piracy ====
Maniot piracy was observed by the Turkish explorer Evliya Çelebi (1611–1682), who visited Mani with an Ottoman expedition. He said of the Maniots: "They capture the Frank and sell him to us, they capture us and sell us to the Franks." The acquisition of goods from merchant ships through piracy formed part of the Maniot economy from at least as early as the 13th century until well into the 19th.

=== Antiquity ===
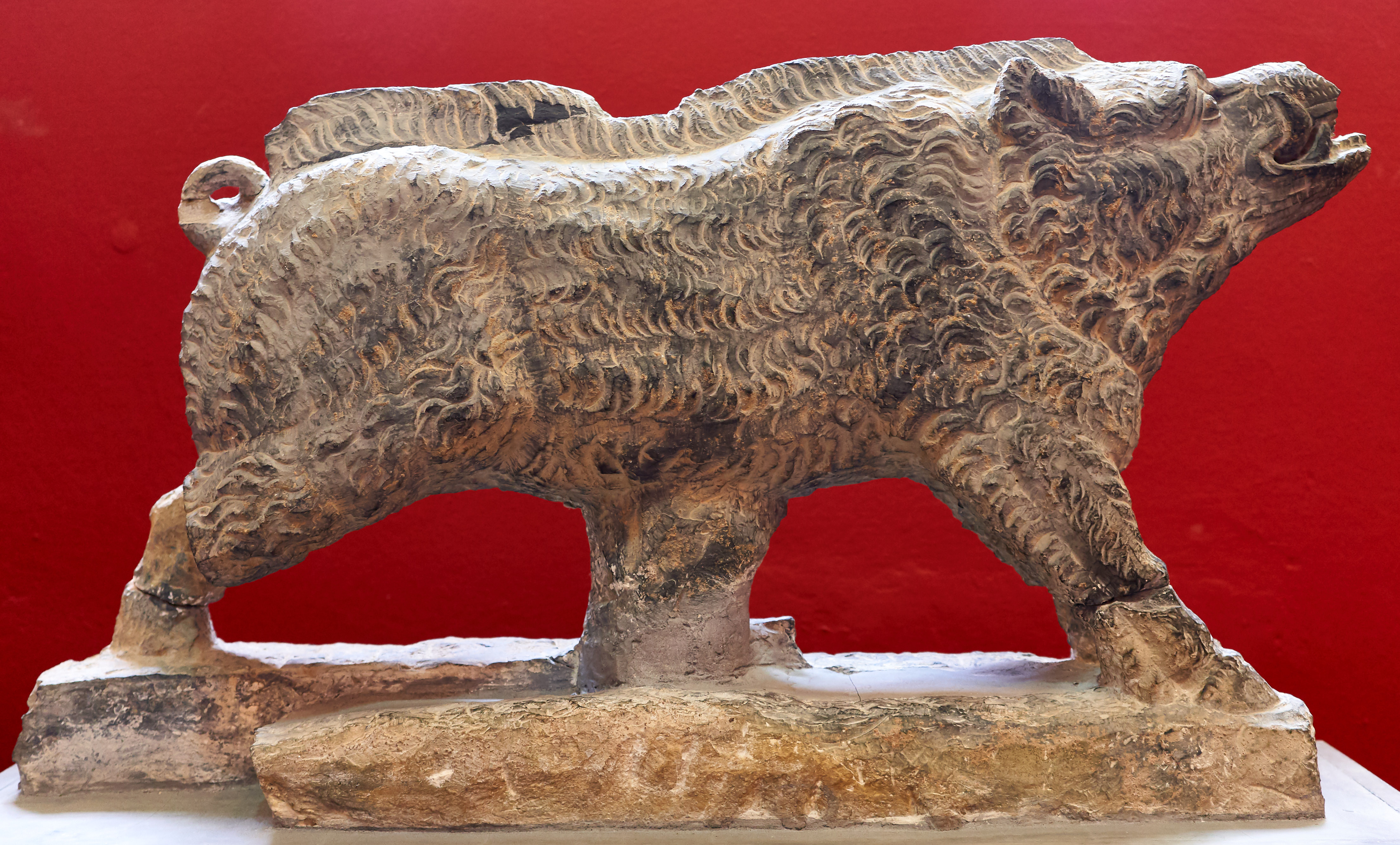
Made of marble quarried at Tainaron in the Hellenistic period, this boar was discovered during excavations of the acropolis of Sparta.

The abundant stone resources of Mani were exploited in antiquity, with limestone and various types of marble extracted from quarries throughout the peninsula; many were situated on the coast. Coloured and white marbles were exported to places including Sparta, Monemvasia, and Corinth, though trade and usage appear to have been largely local.

== Culture ==
=== Clans and family ===
Maniot culture was based on clan or patrilineal kinship groups that valued traditional concepts of manhood and patriarchal family relations. This way of life stemmed from Mani's geographical isolation from the more populated regions of Greece, and was further influenced by its history of foreign invasions; it persisted until the social upheavals of World War II. The stronger clans, the megalogenites, held better-quality land on which they built high towers; they dominated the weaker clans, the ahamnoteroi.

=== Traditions of descent ===
==== Byzantine nobility ====
According to local tradition, some clans were of noble, and often imperial, Byzantine descent.

==== Spartans ====
A tradition originating from outside the peninsula maintains that Maniots are direct descendants of the Spartans of classical antiquity. First proposed in accounts by British, French, and German travellers during the 18th century, this notion, states Gardner (2019), was "rooted in an external admiration for the toughness of Maniot society and the individuals therein, whose fierce independence and freedom was compared to that of classical Sparta." Accepted in western European educated circles, the idea entered Greek national consciousness via young Greeks sent to study in western European universities, where they became aware of the strong influence of Ancient Greece on the imaginations of the European intelligentsia.

Mani's flag has the revolutionary motto ΝΙΚΗ Ή ΘΑΝΑΤΟΣ (Niki i Thanatos 'Victory or Death') above a blue Greek cross on a white background, and below the cross, the words ΤΑΝ Ή ΕΠΙ ΤΑΣ (Tan ē epi tas 'With [your shield] or on it'): this was recorded as a "saying of Spartan women" by Plutarch, a Greco-Roman historian writing in the 1st century AD.

Maniots began to self-identify as "Spartan" in the years leading up to the outbreak of the War of Independence in 1821. To illustrate this, Gardner refers to the beginning of a 1798 poem about Mani by Nikitas Nifakos, a Maniot:

The wretched Spartans fled to these mountains [Taygetus]
And they are those who today are called Maniots.
To protect life and freedom
They built towns and numerous villages in the mountains.
It was not natural for them to become slaves or serfs,
But to be free men, for they were not bastards,
But they were the unfortunate true children of Sparta
Free and well educated offspring.

Shortly after the war began, Petros Mavromichalis, the Maniot leader, was referring in documents to his "Spartan Headquarters" in Kalamata and styling himself "Commander-in-Chief of the Spartan and Messenian Forces".

Post-war, during the remainder of the 19th century, and well into the 20th, there is scant evidence of what Maniots themselves thought of their supposed Spartan heritage. In the late 20th and early 21st centuries, the ideology of Golden Dawn, a Greek neo-fascist political party, (Note: In 2020, Golden Dawn was declared a criminal organization and proscribed.) involved an alignment with presumed ancient Spartan values, with some leaders and prominent members identifying with Sparta through their Maniot origins or ancestry. However, says Gardner, as of 2019 "there is no overt, public assertion of this identity", save for the Spartan saying "ΤΑΝ Ή ΕΠΙ ΤΑΣ" (Tan ē epi tas 'With [your shield] or on it'), quoted by Plutarch, on Mani's revolutionary flag: this is regularly displayed, including at the annual commemoration on 17 March of the outbreak of the War of Independence in the peninsula.

=== Architecture ===
==== Tower houses ====
Mani is known for its unique tower houses called pyrghóspita. These towers were usually surrounded by other houses, family churches, and cemeteries, forming a fortified complex known as a xemóni which served as a clan-based compound.

==== Palaiomaniatika ====
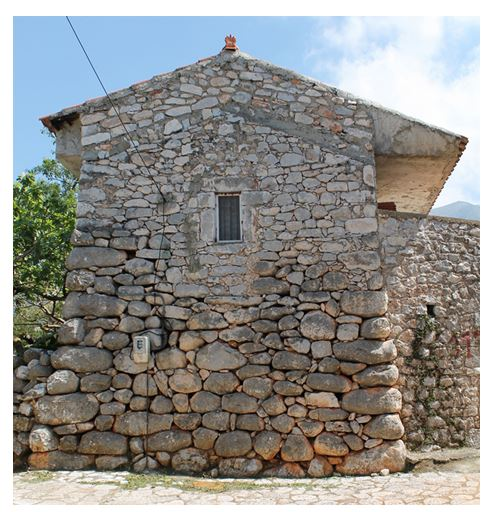
A renovated palaiomaniatika house with dry-stone lower courses

Over 170 settlements in the peninsula contain architecture from the middle of the Byzantine period – roughly from the 8th to the 13th centuries. Known as palaiomaniatika (παλαιομανιάτικα 'old Maniot settlements') or palaiochores (παλαιοχώρες 'old villages'), these settlements are small (10 to 50 houses), with about half still inhabited and the rest abandoned.

Their main features are houses, towers, and cisterns. These structures were typically built with very thick dry-stone walls using large blocks of quarried limestone or limestone boulders. Their vernacular architecture is sometimes described as "megalithic" or "cyclopean", with some scholars surmising a building tradition stretching back to the late Hellenistic period. Evidence from historical documents indicates that people were living in most of the palaiomaniatika well into the Ottoman era.

=== Cuisine ===
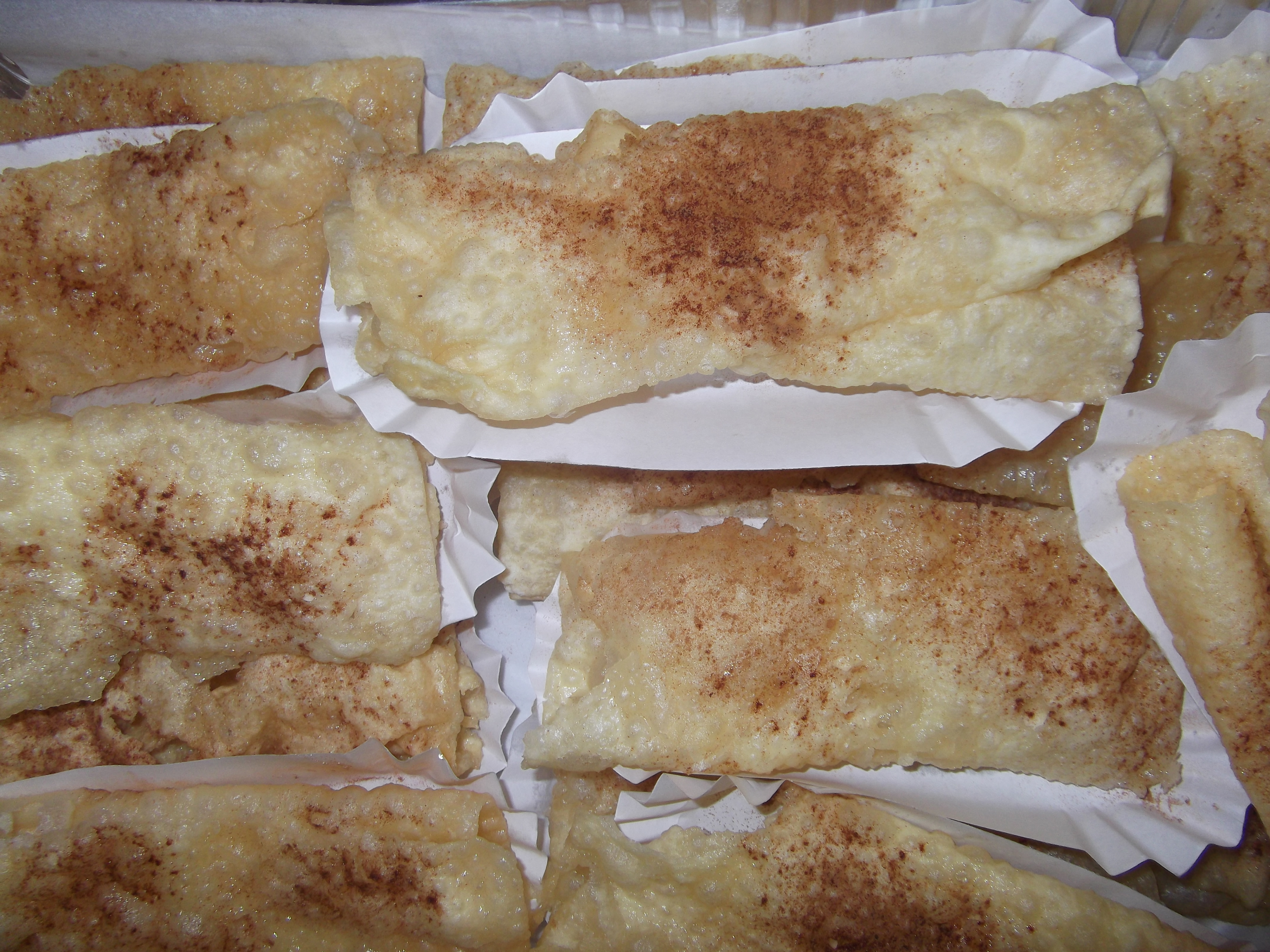
Diples (δίπλες 'honey rolls')

The distinctive ingredients of traditional Maniot cuisine include olive oil and olives; citrus fruits, especially oranges; horta (χόρτα 'wild greens') and aromatic herbs; lupins, broad beans, and lentils; local cheeses such as the white, semi-hard sfela (σφέλα); cheese pies and other savoury pies; lalangia (λαλάγγια 'fried dough strips'); diples (δίπλες 'honey rolls'); and pork products such as syglino (σύγκλινο 'salted pork preserved in pork fat').

=== Dialect ===
Phonologically, the traditional Maniot dialect (Note: Trudgill (2003) notes that when describing varieties of Modern Greek, many Greek linguists distinguish two types: those (such as Tsakonian or Pontic) that differ greatly from Standard Modern Greek, referred to as dialekti (διάλεκτοι 'dialects'); and all other varieties, including Maniot, which are labelled idiomata (ιδιώματα 'idioms').) has two distinguishing features: the historical /y/ (υ), which has shifted to /i/ in Standard Modern Greek, has been maintained as /u/ in Maniot, so that, for example, the standard xylo (ξύλο 'wood') becomes xulo; and Maniot exhibits a pronounced palatalisation of velar consonants.

Family names in Messenian Mani typically end in -eas, while those in Laconian Mani end in -akos or -oggonas.

== Gallery ==
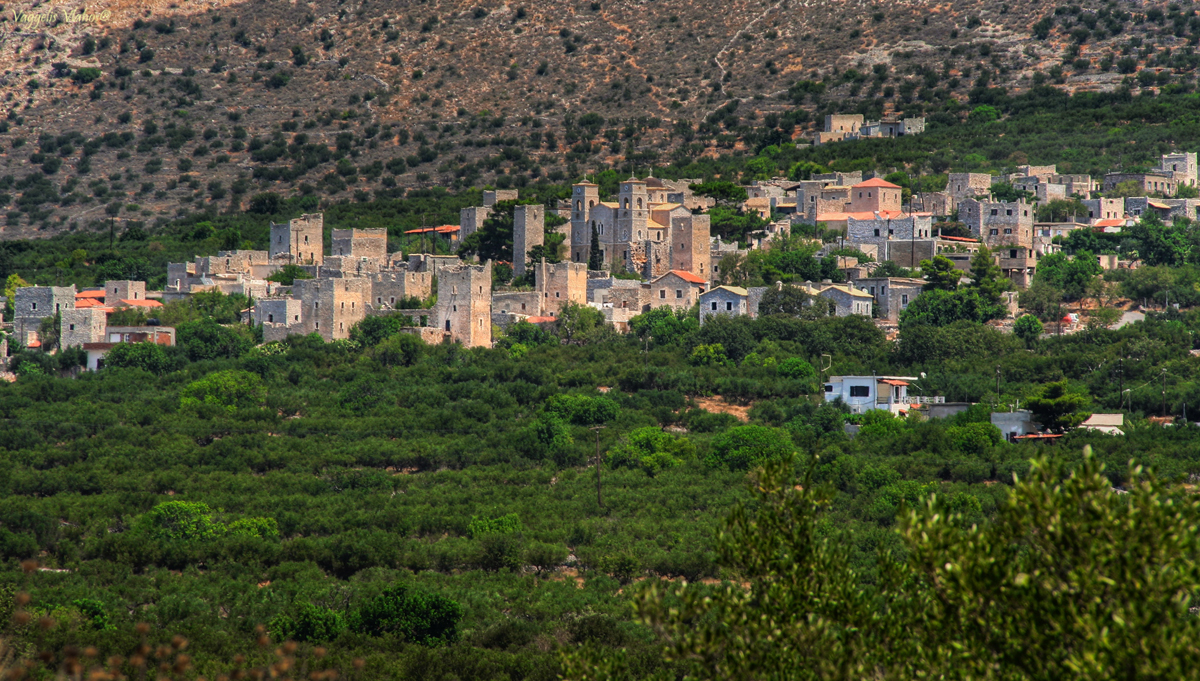
Pyrghóspita (tower houses) in Skoutari

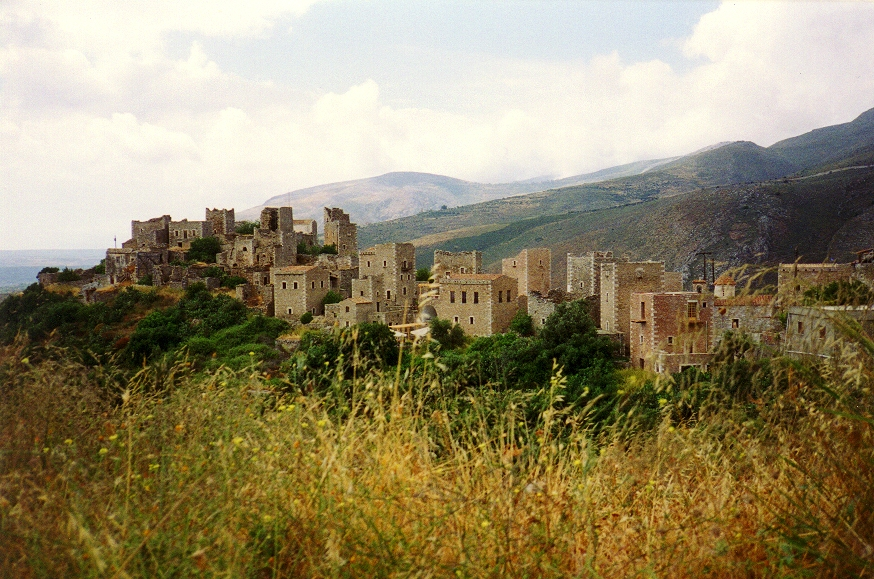
Pyrghóspita in Vatheia

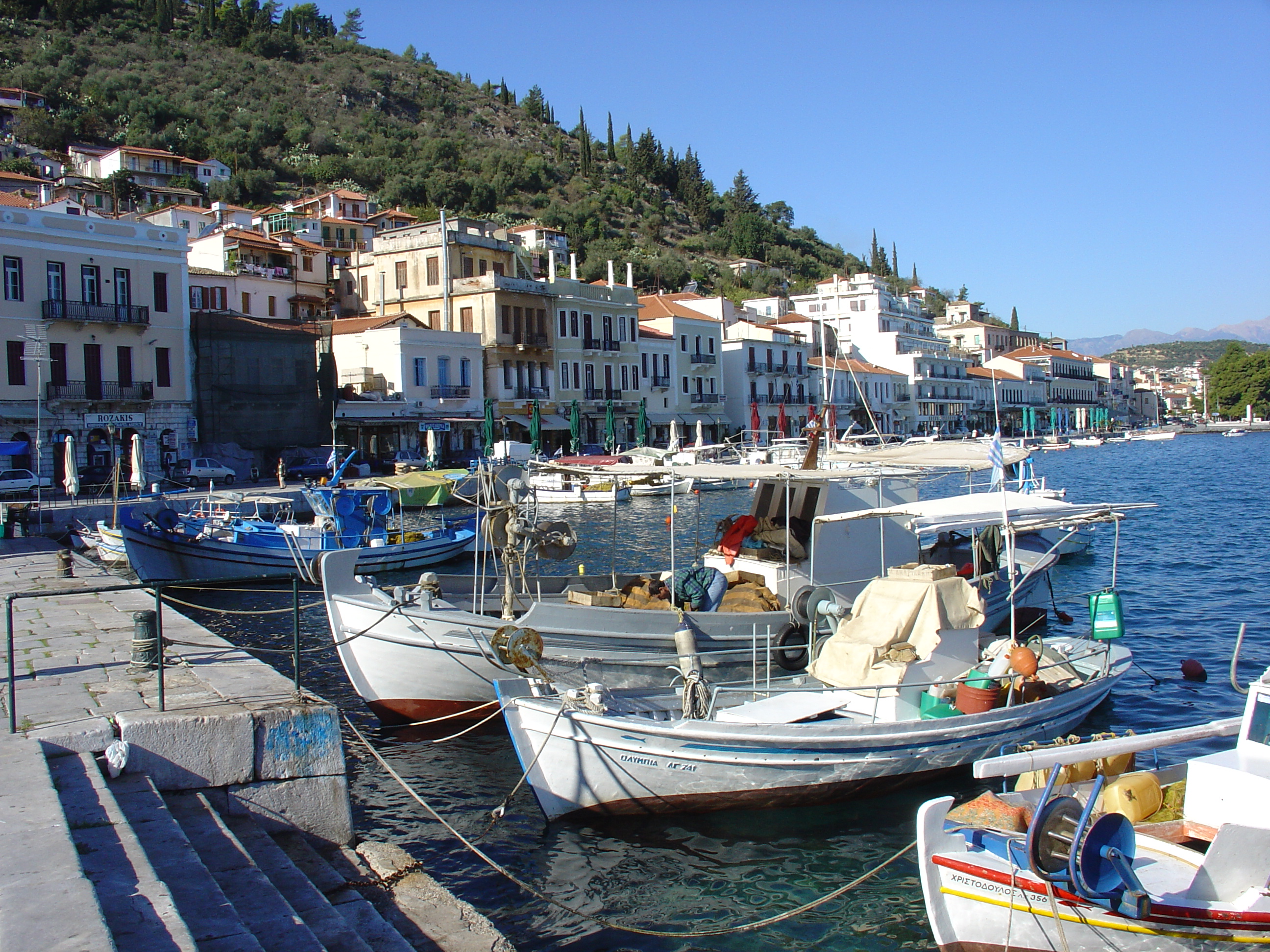
Port of Gytheio

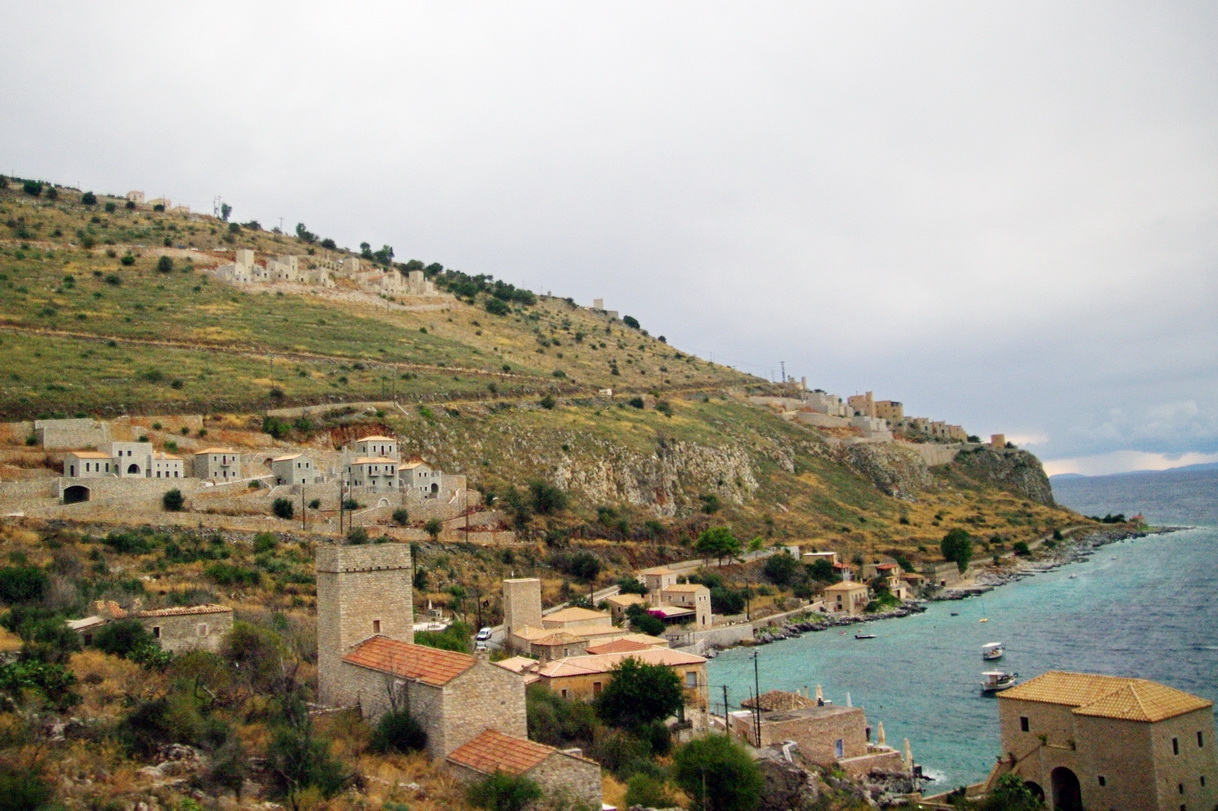
Oitylo village

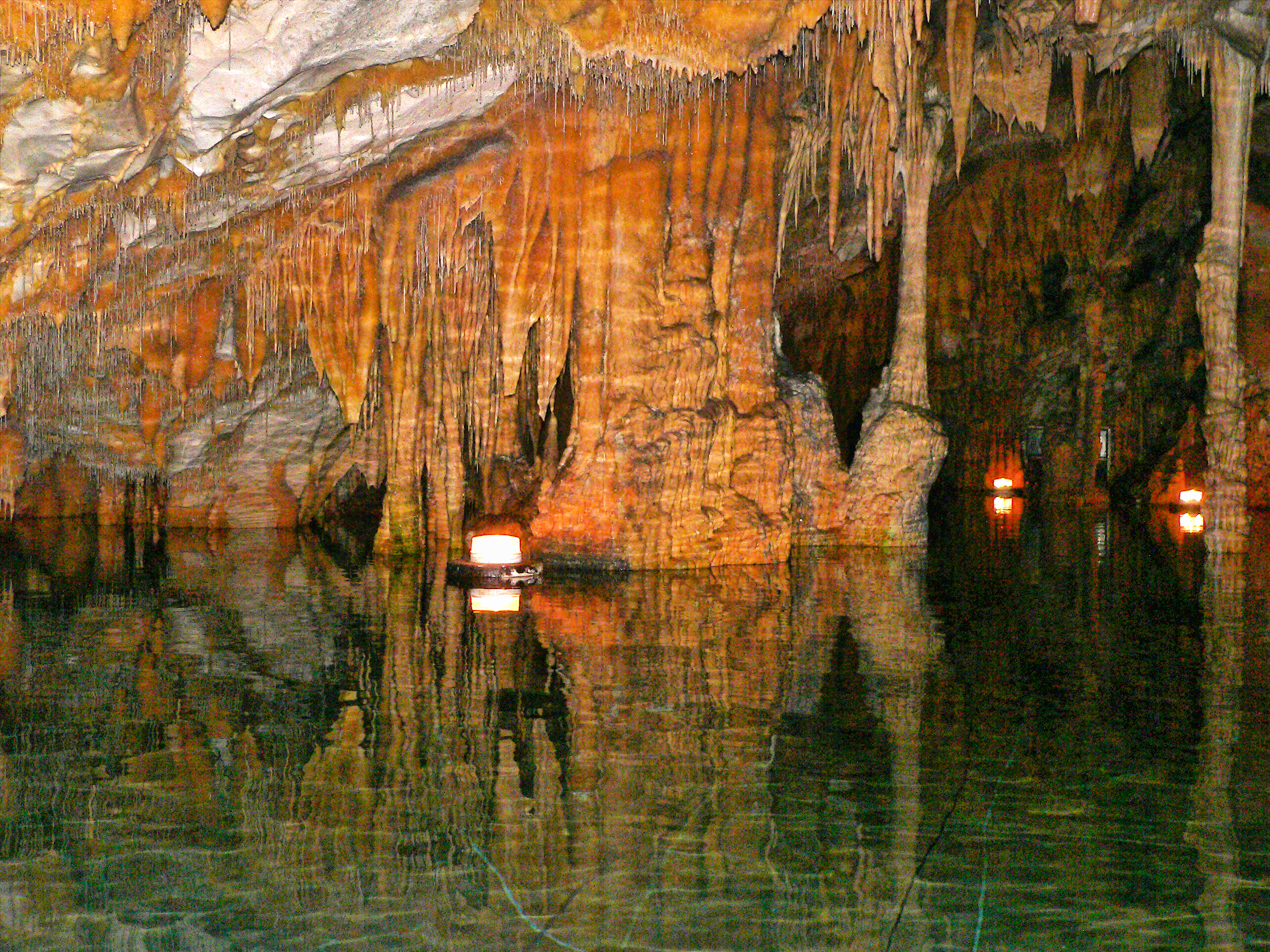
Diros Caves near Pyrgos Dirou

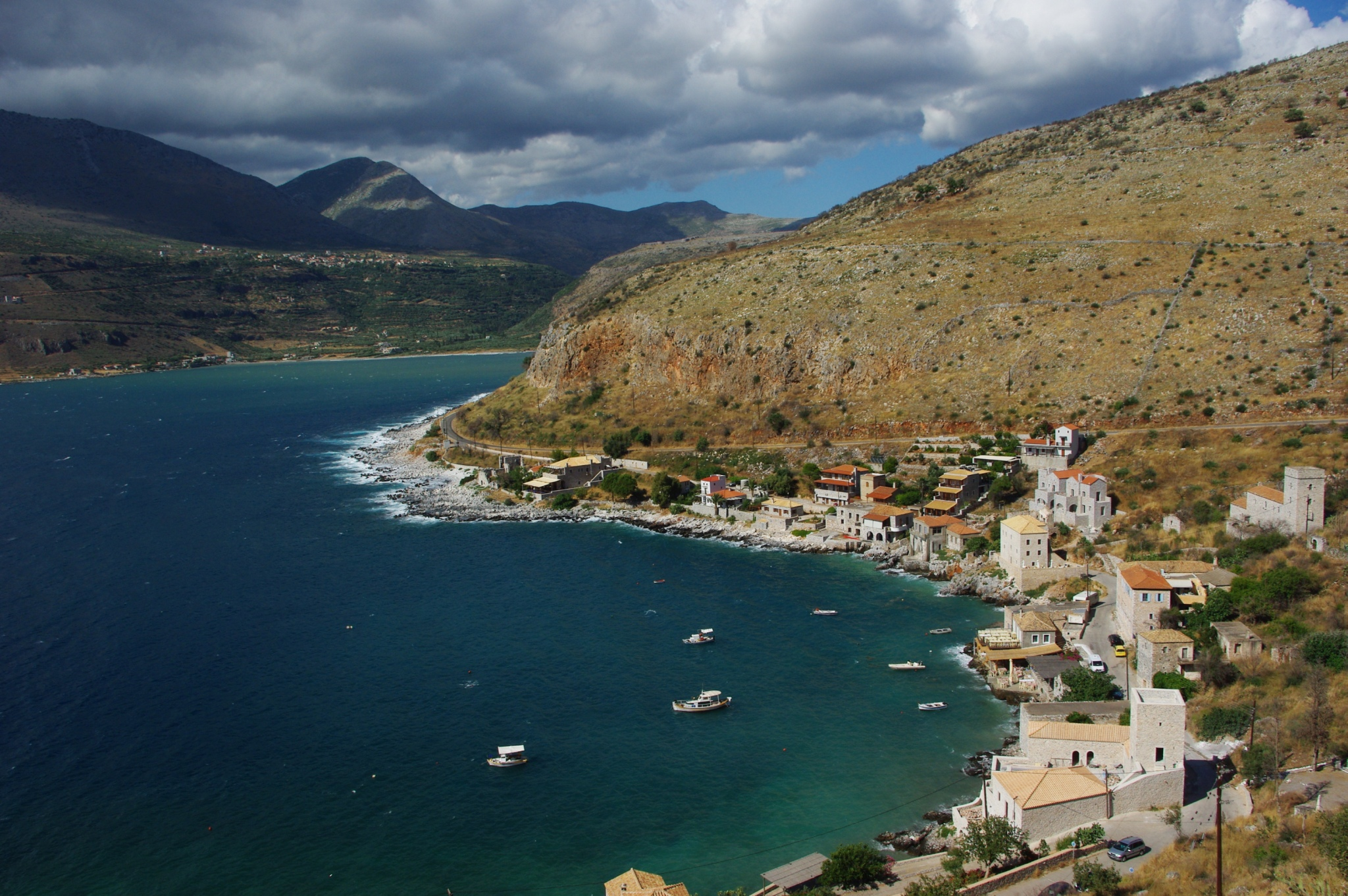
Port of Areopoli

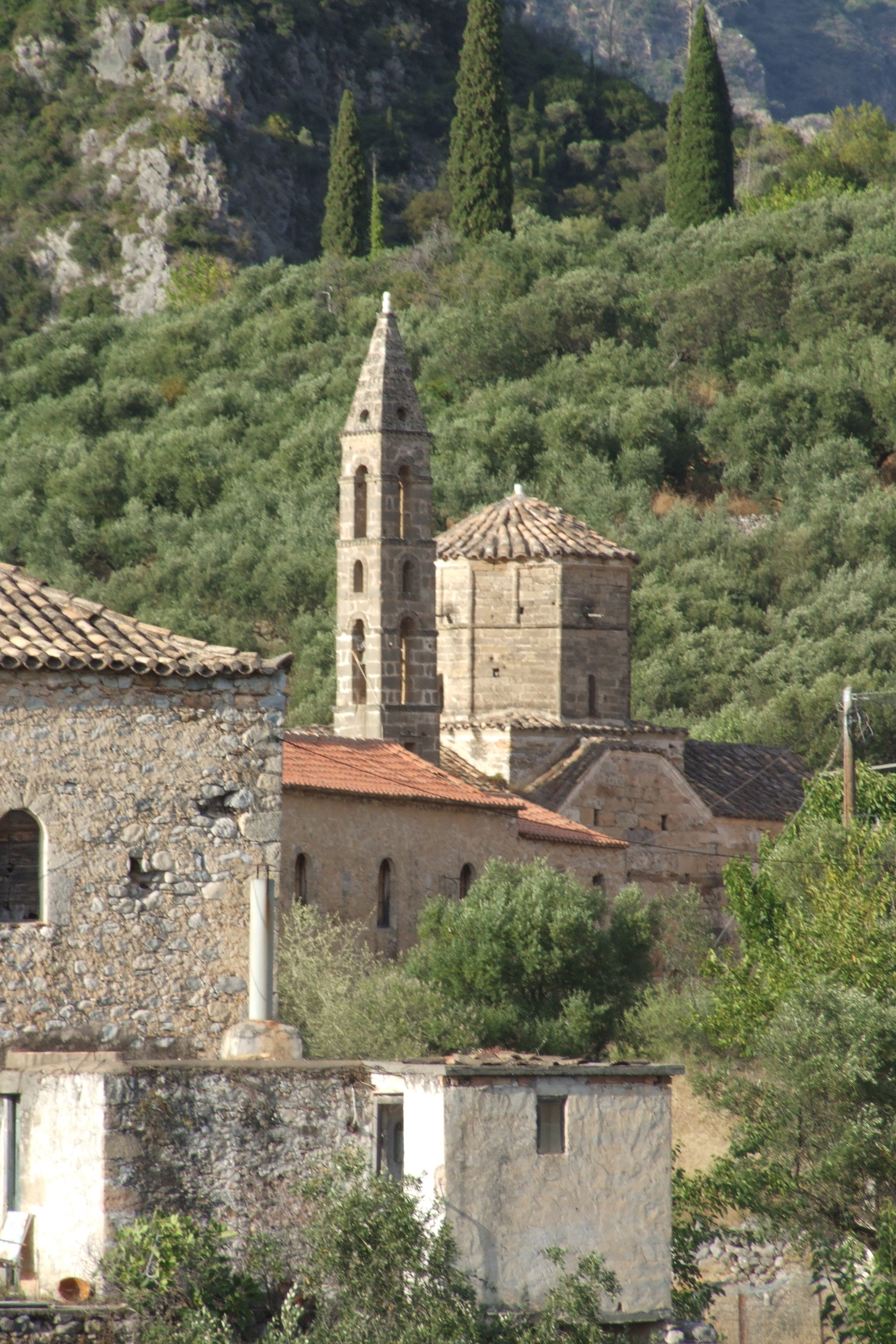
The Church of St. Spyridon in Kardamyli

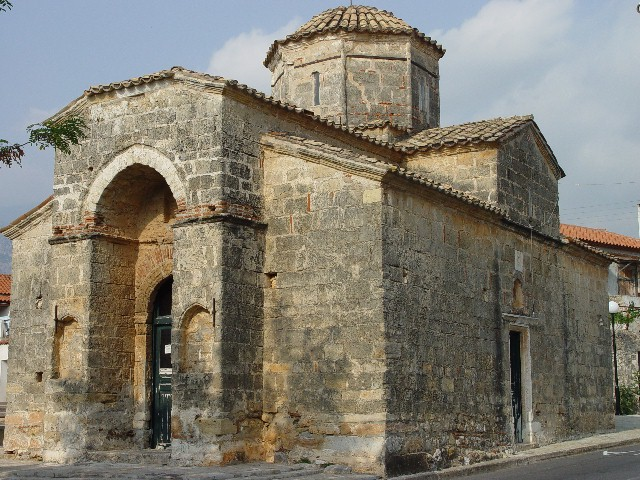
Saints Theodoroi Church in Kampos

== See also ==
- East Mani – Municipality in Laconia, Greece and West Mani – Municipality in Messenia, Greece
- Laconia – Historic and administrative region of Greece
- Maniots – Traditional name for natives of the Mani Peninsula in southern Greece
- Peloponnese – Traditional peninsular region in Greece
- Wars involving Mani (1460–1832)
