= Messa (Greece) =

Coordinates: 36°31′55″N 22°22′52″E

Messa or Messe (Ancient Greek: Μέσση) was one of the nine cities of ancient Laconia enumerated in the Catalogue of Ships, in the Iliad by Homer, who gives it the epithet of πολυτρήρων, 'abounding in pigeons'. Strabo says that the position of Messa was unknown; but Pausanias mentions a town and harbour named Messa, which is identified by most modern scholars with the Homeric town. This Messa is situated on the western coast of Mani, between Hippola and Oetylus; and the cliffs in the neighbourhood are said to abound in wild pigeons.

Its site is located near the modern Cape Tigani.
