= Grand Magne =

Crusader castle in southern Greece

Grand Ma[i]gne (French for "Great Maina", in Greek: Μεγάλη Μαΐνη) or Vieux Ma[i]gne ("Old Maina", in Greek: Παλαιά Μαΐνη) was a Frankish castle in the Mani Peninsula, Greece. It was built, according to the Chronicle of the Morea, ca. 1248–1250 CE by William II Villehardouin, the Prince of Achaea in order to control the Slavic tribe of the Melingoi which occupied Mount Taygetos. Villehardouin was captured by the Byzantines in 1259 at the Battle of Pelagonia and was forced to surrender the castle as ransom for his release.

The location of the castle is not known and several possibilities have been raised. Modern usage refers to the castle of Porto Kagio as "Mani", but medieval portolans place the castle of Grand Magne on the western shore of the peninsula, and its fortification was not mentioned by portolans or travelers before about 1568. Another candidate is the settlement of Tigani, but though a sizeable medieval town it shows no traces of having been the site of a crusader fortress.

Antoine Bon preferred the nearby site of Cavo Grosso (Cape Thyrides), also known as Kastro tis Orias near Dryalos. 19th-century travellers including the French Expédition scientifique de Morée mentioned the existence of fortifications at the site, which occupies a commanding position. J. M. Wagstaff rejected this as, according to his research, there is no evidence that there ever was a fortification at Kastro tis Orias, and instead identified Grand Magne as the castle at Kelefa. He admits that the evidence is weak as the design of Kelefa Castle is not typical of Frankish forts, but claims this is due to rebuilding done by Ottomans in 1670.
