= Petrovouni =

Petrovouni (Greek: Πετροβούνι) may refer to several places in Greece:

- Petrovouni, Achaea, a village in the municipality of Aigialeia, Achaea
- Petrovouni, Arcadia, a village in Arcadia
- Petrovouni, Ioannina, a village in the municipality of North Tzoumerka in the Ioannina regional unit
- Petrovouni, Laconia, a village in the municipality of East Mani in Laconia
- Petrovouni, Messenia, a village in the municipality of West Mani in Messenia
