= Ectoedemia euphorbiella =

Scientific classification
- Kingdom: Animalia
- Phylum: Arthropoda
- Clade: Pancrustacea
- Class: Insecta
- Order: Lepidoptera
- Family: Nepticulidae
- Genus: Ectoedemia
- Species: E. euphorbiella

Binomial name
- Ectoedemia euphorbiella (Stainton, 1869)

Synonyms
- Nepticula euphorbiella Stainton 1869; Nepticula tergestina Klimesch, 1940

Species of moth

Ectoedemia euphorbiella is a moth of the family Nepticulidae. It is found in southern Europe. It is confined to the warmest parts of Europe and has a very localised distribution. It is always found close to the sea.

The larvae feed on Euphorbia acanthothamnos, Euphorbia brittingeri, Euphorbia characias, Euphorbia dendroides, Euphorbia fragifera, Euphorbia myrsinites, Euphorbia palustris, Euphorbia rigida, Euphorbia serrata and Euphorbia terracina. They mine the leaves of their host plant.
