= Kitta (surname) =

Kitta (written: 橘田) is a Japanese surname. Notable people with the surname include:

- Izumi Kitta (橘田 いずみ) (born 1984), Japanese voice actress and singer
- Mitsuhiro Kitta (born 1942), Japanese golfer
- Tadashi Kitta (橘田 規) (1934–2003), Japanese golfer

== See also ==
- Kitta, the former name of the village Koita in southern Greece
