= Kalamakia Cave Site =

Cave and archaeological site in Greece

Coordinates: 36°40′34″N 22°21′53″E

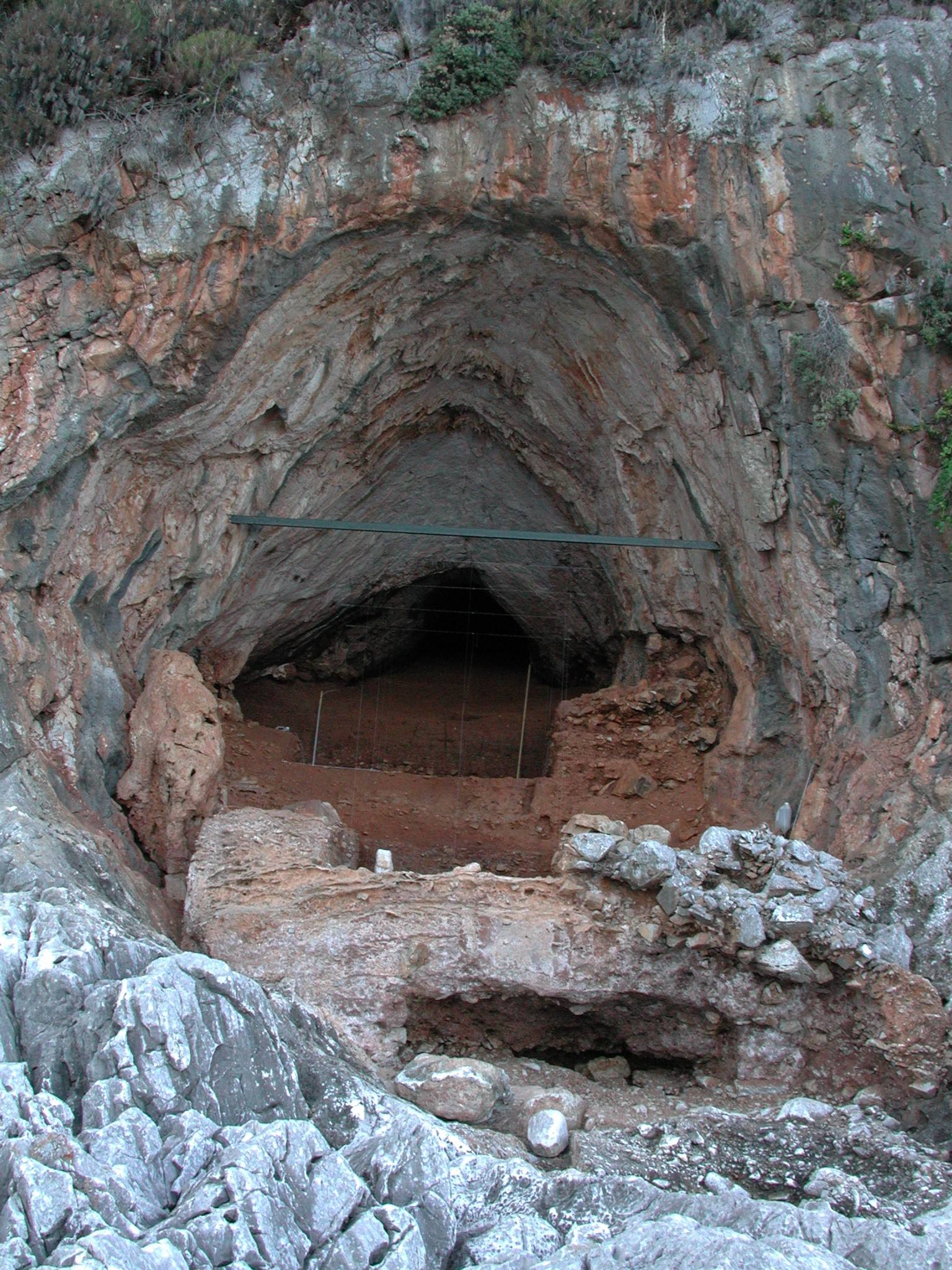
Kalamakia Cave Excavation in 2001

Kalamakia cave, situated on the Mani peninsula, is a fossil-bearing cave in Southern Greece that provides insights into Paleolithic habitation, geology, nature, and climate.

== Background ==
Situated at Areopolis--the western coast of the Mani peninsula of Peloponnese, the cave of Kalamakia was inhabited during the Pleistocene, and its archaeological assemblages and remains encouraged discussion among scholars. Systemic excavations of the Kalamakia cave began in 1993, and quintessential findings include faunal remains, raw material, and Neanderthal remains.

The first systematic excavation of Kalamakia was completed by Andreas Darlas and Henry de Lumley, archaeologists who identified the seven stratigraphic units of the site and the specifics for each unit. Specifically, Kalamakia's seven stratigraphical units arranged from earliest deposition to latest consist of the lower stalagmitic floor, the Tyrrhenian beach, the wind-blown dune sands and small broken angular stones, the angular gravel with reddish sandy-clay mix, the scree of large blocks in a red clay matrix, the layered clayey silts, and the upper stalagmitic floor.

== Geological and physical features ==
The Mani peninsula has been affected by tectonic movements throughout its archaeological history, which caused the formation of several platforms on the site. The cave of Kalamakia occupies one of the lowest platforms above sea level; scientific measurements confirm that the site is within ten meters from the shoreline and approximately two meters above the present sea level.

At the entrance, Kalamakia is seven meters wide and eight meters high, and the cave becomes gradually narrower as one begins to probe its insides. Apart from featuring a main gallery, the cave of Kalamakia also has a secondary and a tertiary gallery slightly above the main cave. Kalamakia is twenty meters deep and, despite its great depth, was likely submerged during the Pleistocene for an extended period and later revealed itself, thanks to marine regression.

== Faunal remains ==
Researchers have identified by scientific methods that 26669 faunal remains have been found at the cave of Kalamakia; however, among the abundant findings, only 486 were identifiable and can be attributed to specific species. Specifically, examples of fauna found include fossils of large vertebrates, micro-vertebrates, and marine fauna. Furthermore, the majority of faunal remains consist of bone fragments that endured a high degree of fragmentation, although teeth fragments do have a higher resistance, making them available for archaeological interpretation. While most specimens are the bones of Fallow deer and Ibex, some are incorporated into a group named "artiodactyls," which represent approximately 63-93% of all faunal bone remains. Moreover, archaeologists suggest that the assemblage of faunal remains may imply the human exploitation of animals and their surroundings through hunting. Another intriguing finding is that, among the types of animals identified, carnivores are relatively rare, although some remains of red fox were present

Scientific research aimed specifically at the bird remains of the cave of Kalamakia, Darlas and Roger's study concludes the types, or taxa, of birds are extremely diversified given the lower number of remains and the high number of taxa. Among all species of birds identified, Galliformes are the most abundant, and their biological features suggest that the overall climate of Kalamakia was most likely temperate instead of cold.

A completed master's thesis from the Aristotle University of Thessaloniki focuses its methodology and interpretation on the molars of Arvicolines, species known for high variation and remarkable adaptive abilities. With geometric morphometrics analysis, it is apparent that the fossil samples of Arvicolines from Kalamakia can be paralleled with those from Northern Greece, indicating a plausible existence of a shared morphology. Moreover, concerning the studied molars, the middle and anterior sectors of the fossil suggest the most diversity, while the posterior part contributes relatively less to the species' evolution.

== Excavated stone remains ==
In regard to the lithic remains found at Kalamakia, original excavators identify most as pieces smaller than 20 mm, and they are usually produced by repeated flaking. The most abundant raw material used for stone tools is fine-grained flints, which can be found near caves during Paleolithic times. The second on the list of abundance is quartz, which is poor in quality, rendering it worthy of producing irregular tools. Furthermore, an intriguing raw material found is green andesite with white spots, which has satisfying quality yet is challenging to collect.

Concerning the generally preferred shapes of stone tools, it is evident that inhabitants produced tools small in size and relatively thin, and archaeological research was able to categorize the tools made since most tools show signs of stylized retouching. Given the inhabitants' elaborate attempts to manufacture stone tools in magnificent amounts, researchers suggest the existence of a "stone industry" at Kalamakia during the Middle Paleolithic period.

== Human activity and Neanderthal remains ==
Throughout the excavation site, a total of fourteen human remains were found. Neanderthal remains have been discovered, showing that hominids systematically occupied the cave. For instance, a recent study completed by researchers from the University of Crete concludes that the Neanderthals had repeatedly occupied the site, as some occupation periods were short while others were relatively permanent. During their stay, the Neanderthals were preoccupied with innovative efforts toward raw material, a statement supported by the aforementioned discussion of stone remains. Furthermore, this article arrives at the conclusion of studies focused on faunal remains, as it argues that Kalamakia is an attractive site for human habitation due to its temperate climate.
