= Thalamae (Laconia) =

Town of ancient Laconia

Coordinates: 36°47′10″N 22°19′32″E

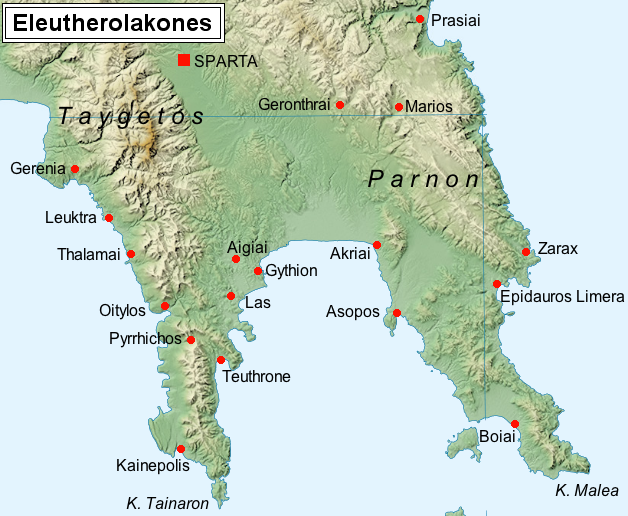
map of the Free Laconian towns

Thalamae or Thalamai (Ancient Greek: Θαλάμαι or Θαλάμη) was a town of ancient Laconia, which at various times belonged to Messenia.

According to Greek mythology, Thalamae was founded by Pelops, who, after his sister Niobe married Amphion, brought colonists from Boeotia; and was called in the time of Strabo the Boeotian Thalamae.

It stood 80 stadia north of Oetylus, and 20 stadia from Pephnus. Pephnus was on the coast, on the eastern side of the Messenian Gulf, and Thalamae was situated inland, upon the river Miléa, the minor Pamisus of Strabo. Ptolemy also calls it one of the inland towns of Laconia. Theopompus called Thalamae a Messenian town, and we know that the Messenians said that their territory originally extended as far as the minor Pamisus. Indeed, when Hippocoon usurped the throne of Sparta, Tyndareus fled to his brother Aphareus of Messenia where he settled in Thalamae and while living there, children were born to him. Thalamae is mentioned by Polybius. It was subsequently one of the Eleuthero-Laconian towns. In the territory of Thalamae, on the road to Oetylus was a temple and oracle of Ino or Pasiphaë, in which the future was revealed to those that slept in the temple. Even the Spartan kings sometimes slept in the temple for this purpose.

The site of Thalamae is located with the modern village of Thalames (formerly Koutiphari, but renamed to reflect the historical association).
