= Hippola =

Ancient Greek settlement in the Peloponnese

Coordinates: 36°30′14″N 22°21′44″E

Hippola (Ancient Greek: Ἱππόλα) was an Ancient Greek settlement on the Peloponnese, in the region of Laconia on the Mani Peninsula. It was northwest of Cape Matapan. Hippola was in ruins by the time of Pausanias in the 2nd century CE. It contained a temple to Athena Hippolaitis.

The modern settlement of Kipoula is situated near ancient Hippola.
