= Oetylus =

Ancient Greek town in Laconia

Coordinates: 36°42′18″N 22°23′05″E

Oetylus or Oitylos (Ancient Greek: Οἴτυλος), also known as Beitylus or Beitylos (Βείτυλος), or Bityla (Βίτυλα), was a town of ancient Laconia on the eastern side of the Messenian Gulf, at the modern settlement of Oitylo.

Pausanias says that it was 80 stadia from Thalamae and 150 from Messa; the latter distance is too great, but there is no doubt of the identity of Oetylus and modern Oitylo; and it appears that Pausanias made a mistake in the names, as the distance between Oetylus and Caenepolis is 150 stadia. Oetylus is mentioned by Homer in the Catalogue of Ships in the Iliad.

It was believed that it took its name from Oetylus, a son of Amphianax and grandson of Antimachus of Argos. The town honoured him as a hero.

During the Roman period, it was one of the Eleuthero-Laconian towns. It was still governed by its ephors in the 3rd century AD. Pausanias saw at Oetylus a temple of Sarapis, and a wooden statue of Apollo Carneius in the agora.

Among the modern houses of Oitylo, there are remains of Hellenic walls, and in the church, a beautiful fluted Ionic column supporting a beam at one end of the aisle, and three or four Ionic capitals in the wall of the church, probably the remains of the temple of Sarapis.
