= Dryalos =

Dryalos Δρύαλος
- Community
- Location within Greece
- Coordinates: 36°29′N 22°22′E
- Country: Greece
- Administrative region: Peloponnese
- Regional unit: Laconia
- Municipality: East Mani
- Municipal unit: Oitylo

Population (2021)
  - Community: 117
- Time zone: UTC+2 (EET)
  - Summer (DST): UTC+3 (EEST)

Dryalos (Δρύαλος) or Dry (Δρυ) is a village in the municipal unit of Oitylo, Laconia, Peloponnese, Greece.

A nearby hilltop, 300 m (980 ft) high, is named "Kastro tis Orias" ("Castle of the Fair Maiden"), and is sometimes given as the site of the medieval castle the Grand Magne, but it has no remains of a castle.
