= Koita =

Koita Κοίτα
- Community
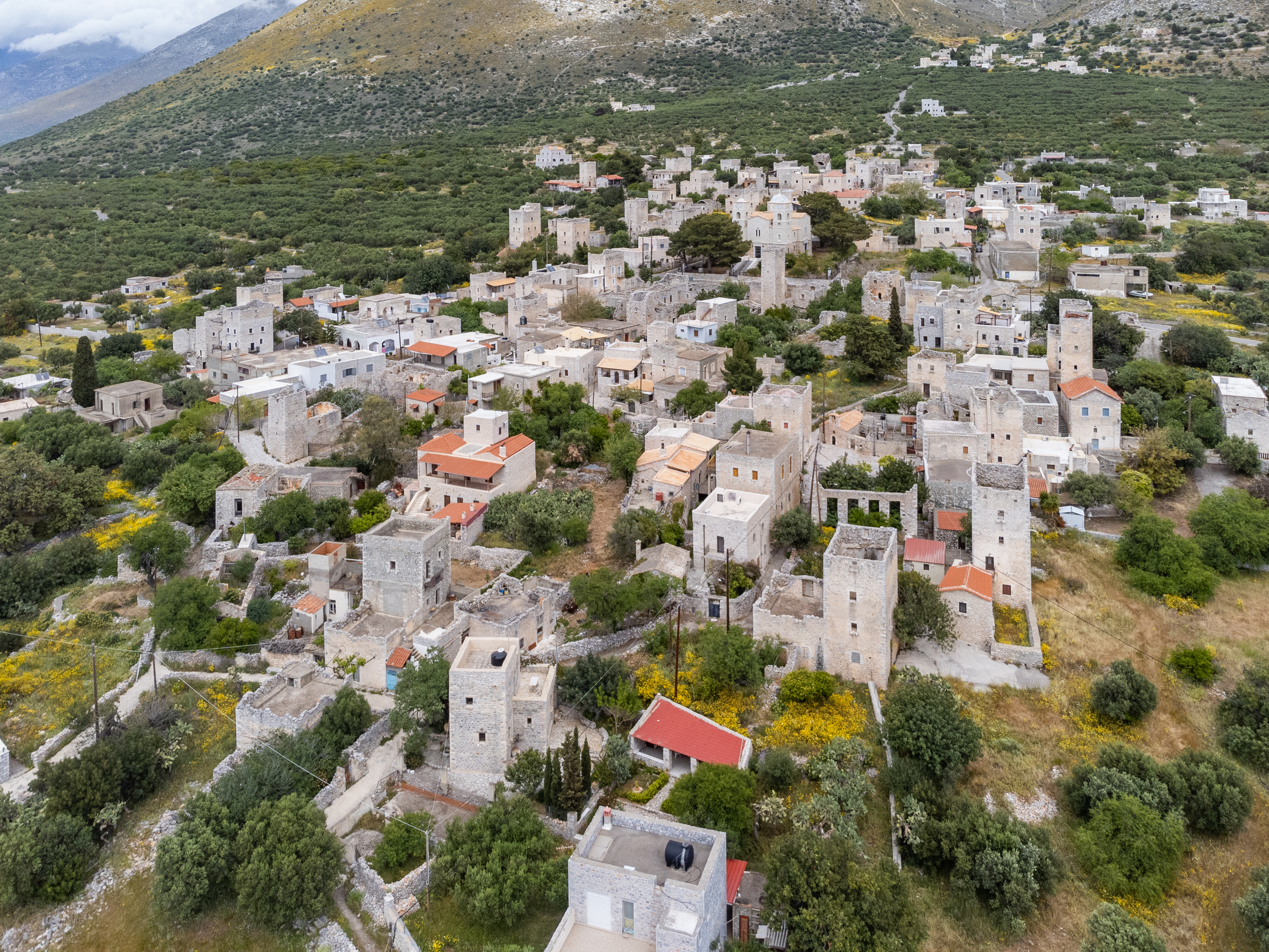
- Koita

- Location within Greece
- Coordinates: 36°31′N 22°24′E
- Country: Greece
- Administrative region: Peloponnese
- Regional unit: Laconia
- Municipality: East Mani
- Municipal unit: Oitylo

Population (2021)
  - Community: 290
- Time zone: UTC+2 (EET)
  - Summer (DST): UTC+3 (EEST)

Koita (Greek: Κοίτα, before 1940: Κίττα - Kitta) is a village in the Mani peninsula, Laconia, Greece. It is part of the municipal unit of Oitylo. It is built on top of a hill, overlooking the sea. Koita is known for its many Maniot pyrgoi (war towers). Partially abandoned, much of the population left between World War II and today. It was the scene of Mani's last vendetta, in 1870 which required the intervention of the army, with artillery to halt it. It is among the oldest villages in Mani, being mentioned in the Iliad as "Messes", a village in Menelaus' kingdom. Population 290 (2021).

== Subdivisions ==
The community of Koita consists of the main village Koita and the smaller villages Agios Georgios, Ano Gardenitsa, Archia, Kalonioi, Kato Gardenitsa, Kechrianika, Nomia and Psi.

== See also ==
- List of settlements in Laconia
