= Petrovouni, Messenia =

Village in Messenia, Greece

Coordinates: 36°53′24″N 22°14′34″E

Petrovouni is a small village on the escarpment above Kardamyli on the Mani Peninsula in Messenia on the southern Peloponnese peninsula of Greece. It is the home to the Karaveli Monastery and the Faneromeni Monastery of Mani.

== Faneromeni Monastery ==
Most of the monastery buildings are in ruins or have been scavenged for building stone, but the main church, the katholikon, is still whole and is used on occasion. The church is set back from the road and is in a locked compound. The murals inside date from the 1780s.
