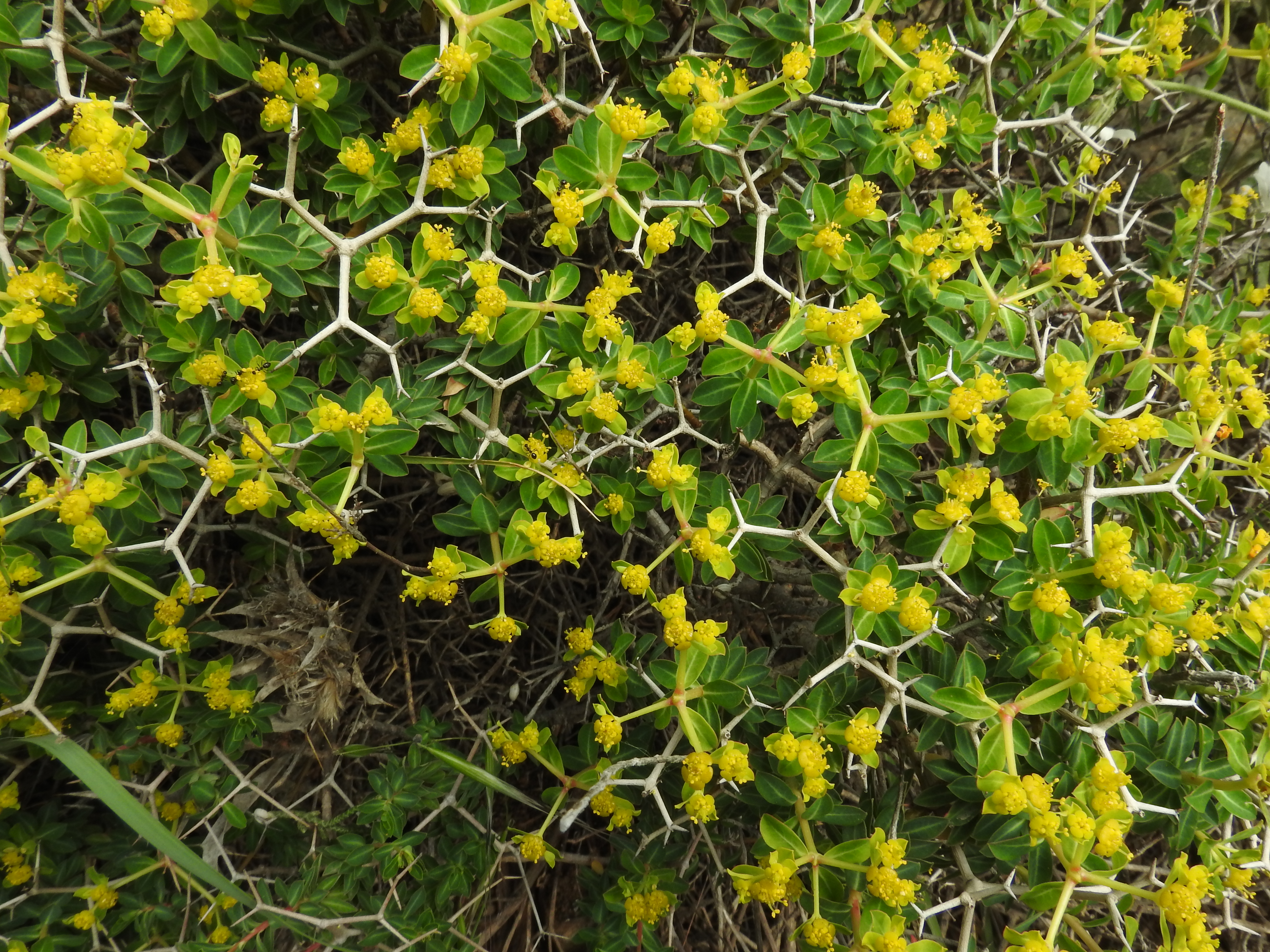
- In Crete

Scientific classification
- Kingdom: Plantae
- Clade: Embryophytes
- Clade: Tracheophytes
- Clade: Spermatophytes
- Clade: Angiosperms
- Clade: Eudicots
- Clade: Rosids
- Order: Malpighiales
- Family: Euphorbiaceae
- Genus: Euphorbia
- Species: E. acanthothamnos

Binomial name
- Euphorbia acanthothamnos Heldr. & Sartori

= Euphorbia acanthothamnos =

Species of flowering plant

Euphorbia acanthothamnos, Greek spiny spurge, is a species of flowering plant, belonging to the family Euphorbiaceae.

== Description ==
It is a shrub that reaches 40 cm in height. It forms a thorny cushion that blooms from March to June. It grows mainly in limestone areas.

== Distribution ==
It is endemic to the eastern Mediterranean, Crete, Greece, and Turkey. It grows from sea level to more than 2000 meters.

== Taxonomy ==
Euphorbia acanthothamnos was described by Heldr. & Sart. ex Boiss. and published in Diagnoses Plantarum Orientalium Novarum, ser. 2, 4: 1859. 86.

Acanthothamnos is an epithet that means "thorny bush" in Greek.
