= Tigani =

Landform in southern Greece

Coordinates: 36.54484°N 22.36584°E

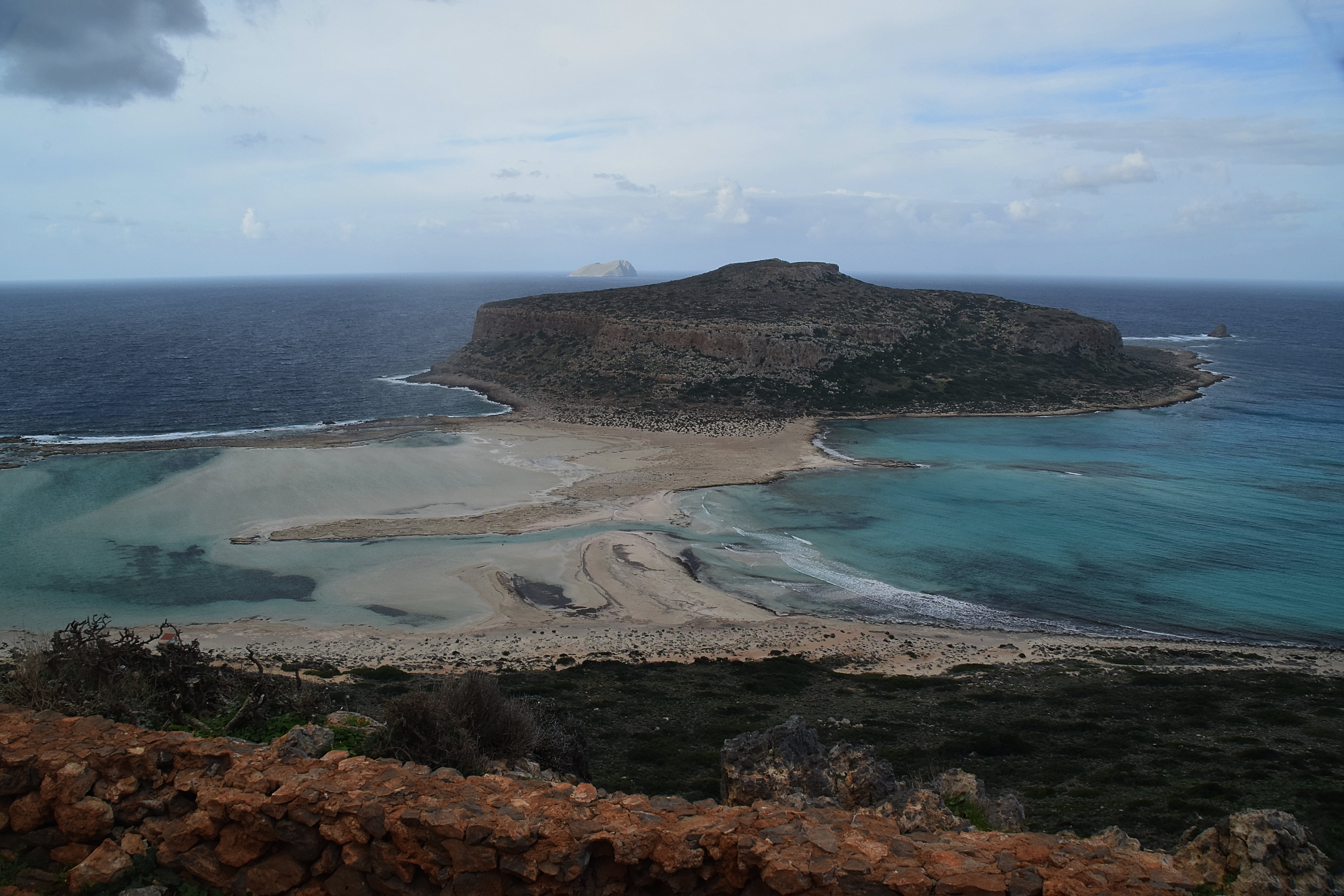
Tigani peninsula, Greece.

Tigani (Τηγάνι) is a small peninsula in the landscape of Mani in southern Greece. The name is Greek for "frying pan". Tigani is surrounded by the sea except for a narrow strip of land that connects to the mainland. The ruins of a probable crusader castle can be found there. The castle's position and its walls made it extremely hard to capture.

== Megali Maina ==
Many historians believe that Tigani is the location of the castle Megali Maina (also called Grande Magne) because Tigani fits elements of historic descriptions of Megali Maina.
