= Vatheia =

Vatheia Βάθεια
- Community
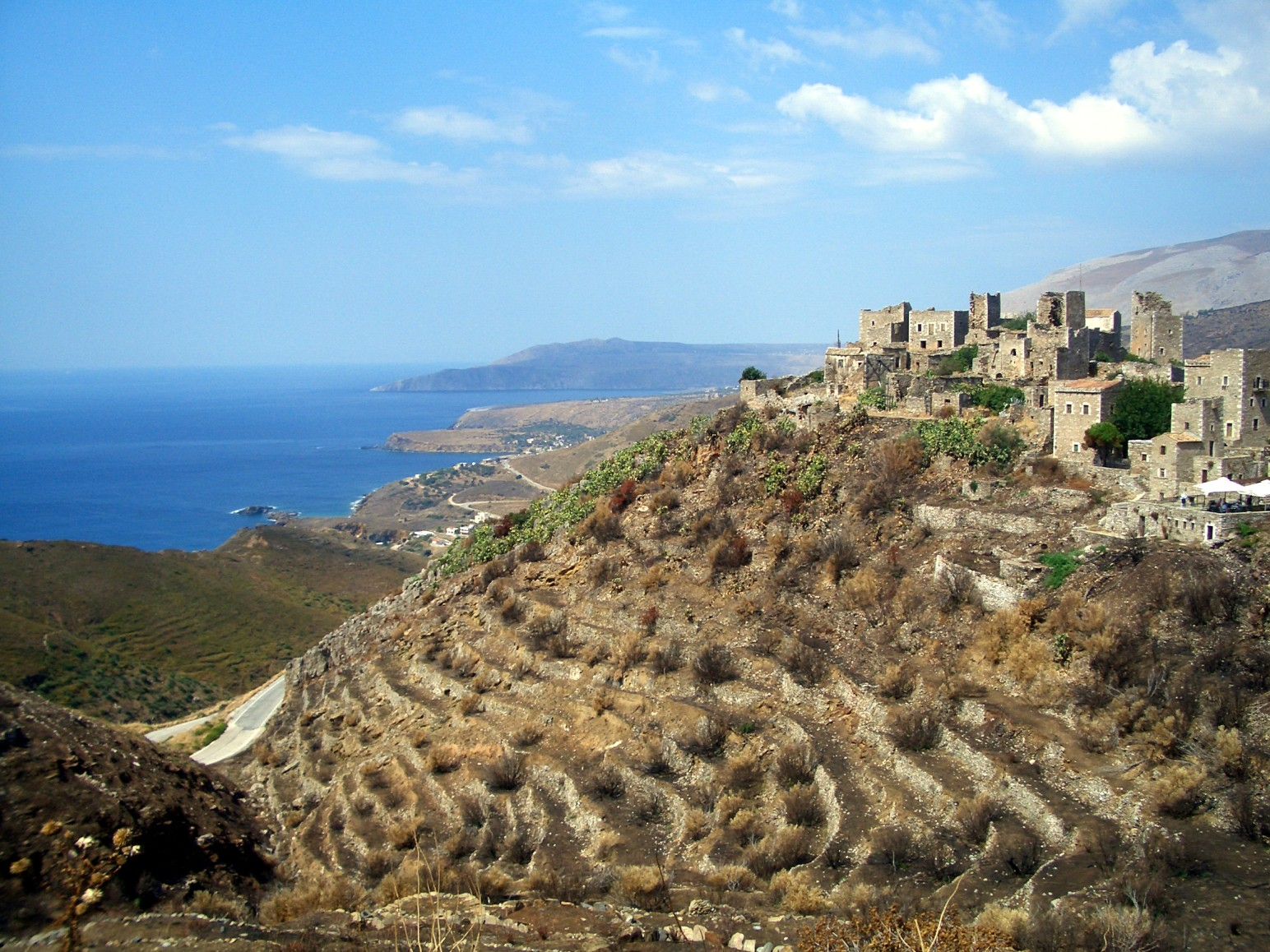
- View of Vatheia

- Location within Greece
- Coordinates: 36°27.2′N 22°28.0′E
- Country: Greece
- Administrative region: Peloponnese
- Regional unit: Laconia
- Municipality: East Mani
- Municipal unit: Oitylo
- Elevation: 180 m (590 ft)

Population (2021)
  - Community: 78
- Time zone: UTC+2 (EET)
  - Summer (DST): UTC+3 (EEST)
- Postal code: 230 71
- Area code: 27330
- Website: www.dimosoitilou.gr/gr/dd/vathia/vathia.htm

Vatheia (Greek: Βάθεια [ˈvaθça]; also Vathia) is a southern Greek village on the Mani Peninsula in south-eastern Laconia near the town of Oitylo. It is largely abandoned. Vatheia is known for its hillside tower-houses which overlook the surrounding landscape. North-east of the village is the Sangias range.

Vatheia is linked by road to Areopoli and Kalamata to its north and Cape Matapan (also known as Tenaro and Tenairon) to the south. Farmland and maquis shrubland cover the hillsides. On the hills and mountainsides around Vatheia proper are clusters of abandoned houses, towers and chapels known as the perichora, meaning "environs".

Vatheia is a popular tourist destination, particularly in spring and summer as wildflowers cover the surrounding hills. It also offers examples of southern Maniot vernacular architecture of the 18th and 19th centuries. The nearest villages are Kyparissos, Alika and Gerolimenas to the north-west and Lagia to the north-east.

== History ==
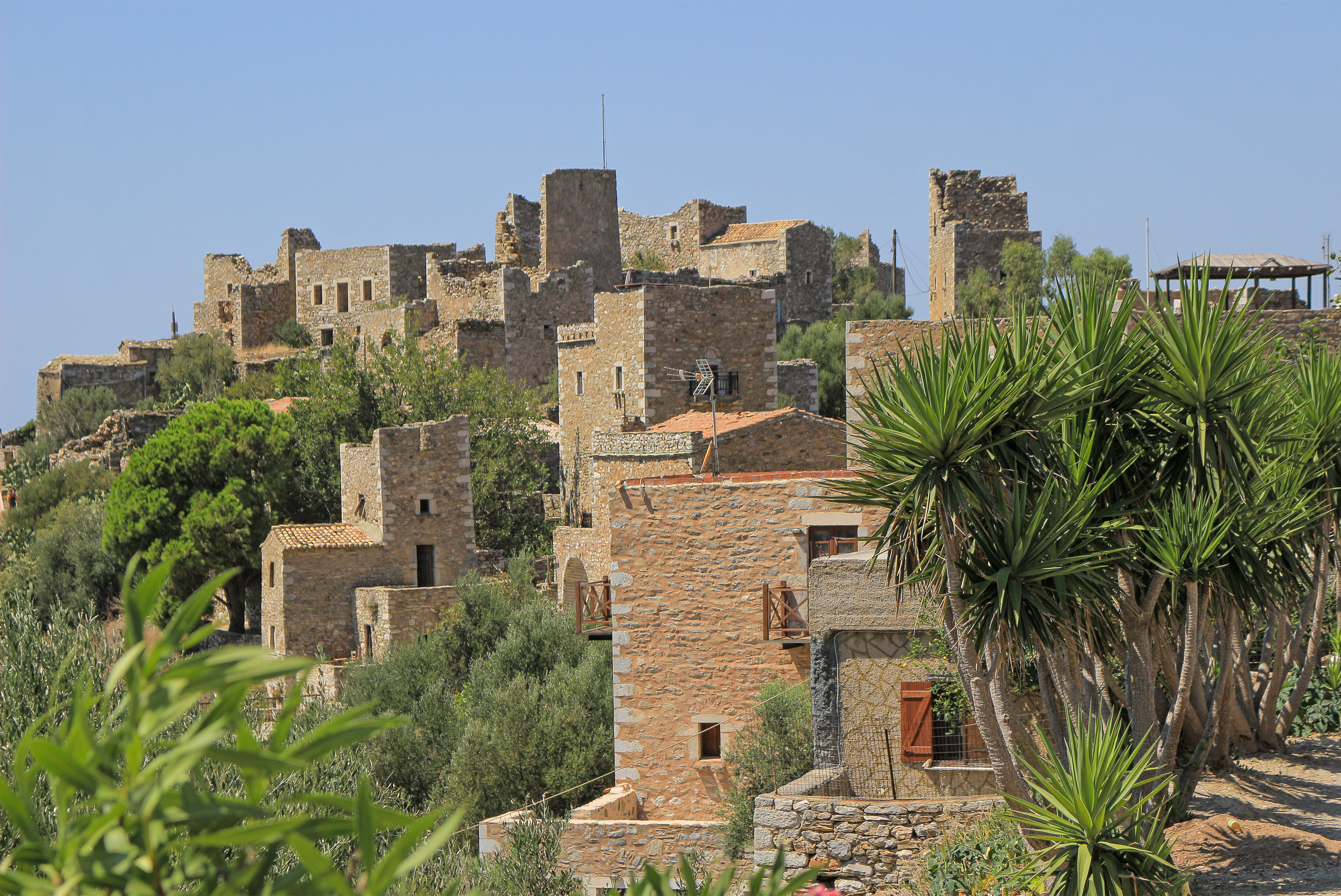
Traditional tower houses in Vatheia

Vathia is first mentioned in 1571 by a Venetian diplomatic mission as casale di Vathia.

In 1618 an unofficial census was conducted by an agent of Charles, Duke of Nevers named Philipe de Lange Châteaurenault in cooperation with a prominent Maniot clan leader named Pietro Medici. The village was recorded as "vatia" with 20 hearths.

In 1700 the Grimani census was carried out for the newly established Kingdom of the Morea. The Venetians recorded a total population of 212 persons distributed in 54 families. The reasons for this substantial population growth over the 17th century are unclear.

On 13 April 1805 William Martin Leake passed through Vatheia ("Βάθια" in his text) on the way to Cape Matapan on the coastal road. His journey was briefly interrupted by a band of local armed men. Leake's guides, being Maniots themselves, negotiated passage and informed him that Vatheia has been divided in two warring parties for the past 40 years. They estimated that about 100 men had been killed since the beginning of this clan war. Leake also wrote that Vatheia and its environs consist of three adjacent villages. Between 1750 and 1900 the main habitations—apart from the village itself—were hamlets controlled by eight Vathia clans and their allies. The four largest clans were the Karabatiani, Michalakiani, Kaledoniani, Koutrigari; these families lived in and around Vatheia proper. The other four clans occupied the hamlets.

Below follows a list of the clans with their constituent families:

Michalakiani	Karabatiani	Kalidoniani	Fidopiastes	Koutrigari	Athanasiani	Stravokefali	Michelongones
Angelakos	Alafakis	Kalidonis	Fidopiastis-Kokkinakos	Koutrigaros	Athanasakos	Stravokefalos-Panagiotakos	Michelakis
Androutsakos	Andreakos	Karakitsakos	Balinis				
Gerakarakos-Vasilakos	Georgakakos	Mitsakos					
Giannakakos	Gligorongonas						
Giannoukakos-Pikrologos	Kakleas-Mavroeidakos						
Drakoularakos	Kalfakakos						
Exarchakos-Arfanakos	Katelanos						
Zekakos	Koutrouvis						
Kalapothakos	Lagoudis						
Keramidas	Laos						
Kleftogiannis	Mageris						
Mitsakos-Fikardos	Mingiros						
Xanthakos	Xypolitos						
Patsandonis	Panagakos						
Sbaras
Syngikos-Andonakos

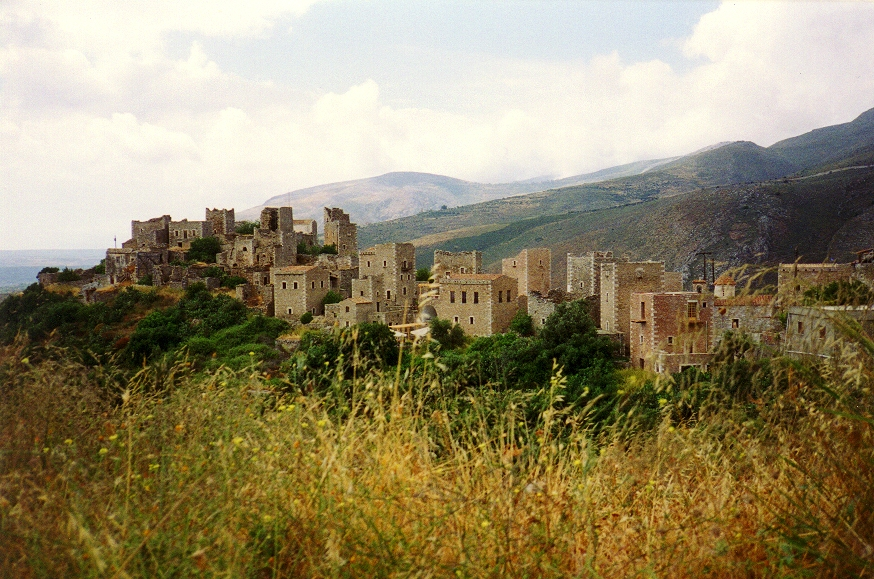
The tower houses of Vatheia.

On 15 August 1806, representatives of many prominent Maniot clans gathered in Marathonisi to sign an oath of fealty to Andonis Grigorakis, Bey of Mani. The entry for Vatheia was as follows: "Michalakiani, Gerandoniani and Karabatiani and the environs, we abide collectively". The communal decision to swear fealty to the Bey might have signalled the end of the war mentioned by Leake a year earlier. Furthermore, this is the only known mention of the Gerandoniani clan. The local clan war that started in 1764 was the catalyst in the formation of the clans which dominated the region from the 19th century until its, nearly total, abandonment during the post-World War II years.

Like much of Mani, Vatheia has numerous megalithic remains. These include: Kostakianika Kalyvia, built on a hillside; and Pachia, built in the mountainside opposite the hill of modern Vatheia.

== Historical population ==
Year	Population
1981	60
1991	113
2001	216
2011	33
2021	78

== See also ==
- List of settlements in Laconia
