= Limberakis Gerakaris =

Maniot soldier, pirate, and later Ottoman ruler (c. 1644–1710)

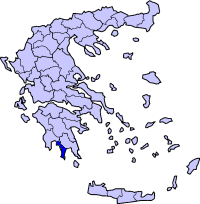
- Mani (dark blue), the birthplace of Limberakis Gerakaris, within Greece.
- Born: ca. 1644; Mani Peninsula
- Died: 1710 Brescia
- Allegiance: Ottoman Empire; Republic of Venice
- Rank: Bey, Captain
- Conflicts: Cretan War (1645-1669); Morean War

Liverios Gerakaris (Greek: Λιβέριος Γερακάρης; c. 1644 – 1710), more commonly known by the hypocoristic Limberakis (Greek: Λιμπεράκης), was a Maniot soldier, pirate, and prisoner who was installed as the first Bey of Mani by the Ottoman Empire following its victory over the Republic of Venice in 1669.

== Early years ==
Limberakis Gerakaris was born ca. 1644 in the town of Oitylo on the Mani Peninsula in the Greek Peloponnese. By the age of 15, he was serving as a galley rower in the Venetian navy. He is next heard of in 1664, described as a feared pirate. He was captured by forces of the Ottoman Empire in 1667 and imprisoned in the Bagnio of Istanbul, where he languished for at least two years and faced eventual execution.

While Gerakaris had been pirating, many of his fellow Maniots were assisting longstanding Ottoman rival the Republic of Venice in the Cretan War of 1645 – 1669, in which the Ottomans prevailed. To punish the Maniots, Grand Vizier Köprülü Fazıl Ahmed Pasha sent the Turkish pirate Hasan Baba to subdue the region. The incursion failed.

Köprülü next turned to his Maniot prisoner Gerakaris. Köprülü offered him release on condition that he govern Mani as an Ottoman vassal. He would be installed as "Bey of Mani" in exchange for paying regular tribute to the Sublime Porte and for garrisoning Turkish troops in Maniot strongholds.

Gerakaris accepted the offer at some point after 1669, was transported to Mani, and assumed the new position; dates of his brief reign are uncertain.

== Rule and capture ==
When Limberakis returned to Mani, he ruled like a tyrant with the backing of the Turkish garrisons in Kelefa and Porto Kagio. He made life so difficult for his enemies, the Stefanopouli family and some other families, that they fled, with 700 people moving to Corsica, where they were granted asylum by Genoa. However, Limberakis soon fell out with the Turks and turned to piracy, raiding not only Ottoman but European ships. The Ottomans responded by capturing him during a raid in 1682 and taking him back to Constantinople, where he was imprisoned in the Bagnio.

== Return and downfall ==
In 1684, the Venetians led by Francesco Morosini invaded the Peloponnese with Maniot assistance. The Ottomans, pressed by the Habsburgs, were unable to hold the Peloponnese, so the new Grand Vizier Merzifonlu Kara Mustafa Pasha suggested that Gerakaris be released from the Bagnio. Gerakaris accepted on the condition that he was given the title "His Highness, the Ruler of Mani" and that an amnesty was given to all the people of Greece. This was important because it was the first time the Sultan had recognised the autonomy of Mani. Limberakis joined the Ottoman army at Thebes and over the next few years launched several invasions of the Peloponnese. Limberakis, however, defected to the Venetians in 1696 after the Turks tried to unsuccessfully poison him. The Venetians recognised him as lord of the Morea, pronounced him a knight of Saint Mark and continued to call him Bey of Mani. However, his disloyalty caused him to lose credibility with both the Turks and the Venetians. Later that year, Limberakis led a brutal sacking of Arta in retaliation for the Artans burning his property in Karpenisi. During the raid Catholic relics were destroyed, Venetians citizens were kidnapped and the unleavened bread was thrown on the floor. However, some Artans escaped and complained to the Doge, who had Gerakaris arrested and placed under house arrest at Brescia until his death in 1710.

== Sources ==
- Greenhalgh, Peter and Eliopoulos, Edward. Deep into Mani: Journey to the Southern Tip of Greece. London: Trinity Press, 1985. ISBN 0-571-13524-2
- Kassis, Kyriakos. Mani's History. Athens: Presoft, 1979.
