= Mediterranean Marine Science =

- Discipline: Ecology
- Language: English
- Edited by: Stelios Somarakis

Publication details
- Former name: Thalassographica
- History: 1979–present
- Publisher: EKT ePublishing (Greece)
- Frequency: Tri-annual
- Open access: Yes
- License: Creative Commons Attribution-ShareAlike 4.0
- Impact factor: 2.071 (2018)

Standard abbreviations
- ISO 4: Mediterr. Mar. Sci.

Indexing
- ISSN: 1108-393X (print); 1791-6763 (web)
- OCLC no.: 299988909

Links
- Journal homepage

Mediterranean Marine Science is a peer-reviewed open access scholarly journal publishing original research in the fields of Oceanography, Marine Biology, Fisheries, Marine Conservation, and Aquaculture in the Mediterranean and adjacent areas. It is published by the Hellenic Centre for Marine Research with technical help from EKT ePublishing. The current editor-in-chief is Stelios Somarakis. First published from 1979 under the name 'Thalassographica' it continued under the name 'Mediterranean Marine Science' in 2000 and restarted volume numbering too.

== Abstracting and indexing ==
The journal is abstracted and indexed in:

- Scopus
- DOAJ
- Science Citation Index Expanded
- Biological Abstracts
- BIOSIS Previews
- Essential Science Indicators
- Zoological Record
