= Tsikalia =

Village in Laconia, Greece

Coordinates: 36°28′25″N 22°26′59″E

Tsikalia (Greek: Τσικαλιά) is a village of the Mani peninsula in Laconia in Southern Greece. It is very near to Cape Matapan, which is the southernmost point of mainland Greece. It consists of Pano Chora and Kato Chora. It belongs to the municipality of East Mani with its administrative capital at Gytheio and its historical capital at Areopoli. Its main church, in the centre of the village, is Agia Kyriaki. Its cemetery is Konstadounia with the church Agios Konstadinos inside it. The Community of Tsikalia consists of the villages Tsikalia, Moudanistika, Kotrafi, Sychalasmata and Xerolakkos.
