= Tsekrekos =

Tsekrekos (Greek: Τσεκρέκος, translit. Tsekrekos, transcr. Tsekrekos, Tsecrecos, Tsegrecos and Tsekrakos and occasionally anglicised to Chekrakos) is a Greek surname. It can refer to:

- Andrianos E. Tsekrekos - Greek professor of finance at the Athens University of Economics and Business (AUEB) noted for research in the operation of financial derivatives markets.
- Christos P. Tsekrekos - scholar in the field of communications technology at the National and Capodistrian University of Athens, noted for publications on fiber optics.
- Panayiotis K. Tsekrekos (b. 1945 Argos - d. 2009 Athens) - Greek professor of mathematics at the National Technical University of Athens, noted in Greece for his authorship of textbooks on mathematics
- Dr. Stephen Tsekrekos - Canadian physician, adjunct professor, Medical Director for Workplace Health & Safety at Alberta Health Services and director of Occupational Medicine Specialists of Canada.
