= Kelefa =

Kelefa Κελεφά
- Community
- Location within Greece
- Coordinates: 36°42.44′N 22°24.19′E
- Country: Greece
- Administrative region: Peloponnese
- Regional unit: Laconia
- Municipality: East Mani
- Municipal unit: Oitylo

Population (2021)
  - Community: 30
- Time zone: UTC+2 (EET)
  - Summer (DST): UTC+3 (EEST)
- Area code: 27330
- Vehicle registration: ΑΚ

Kelefa (Greek: Κελεφά) is a castle and village in Mani, Laconia, Greece. It is part of the municipal unit of Oitylo.

== History ==
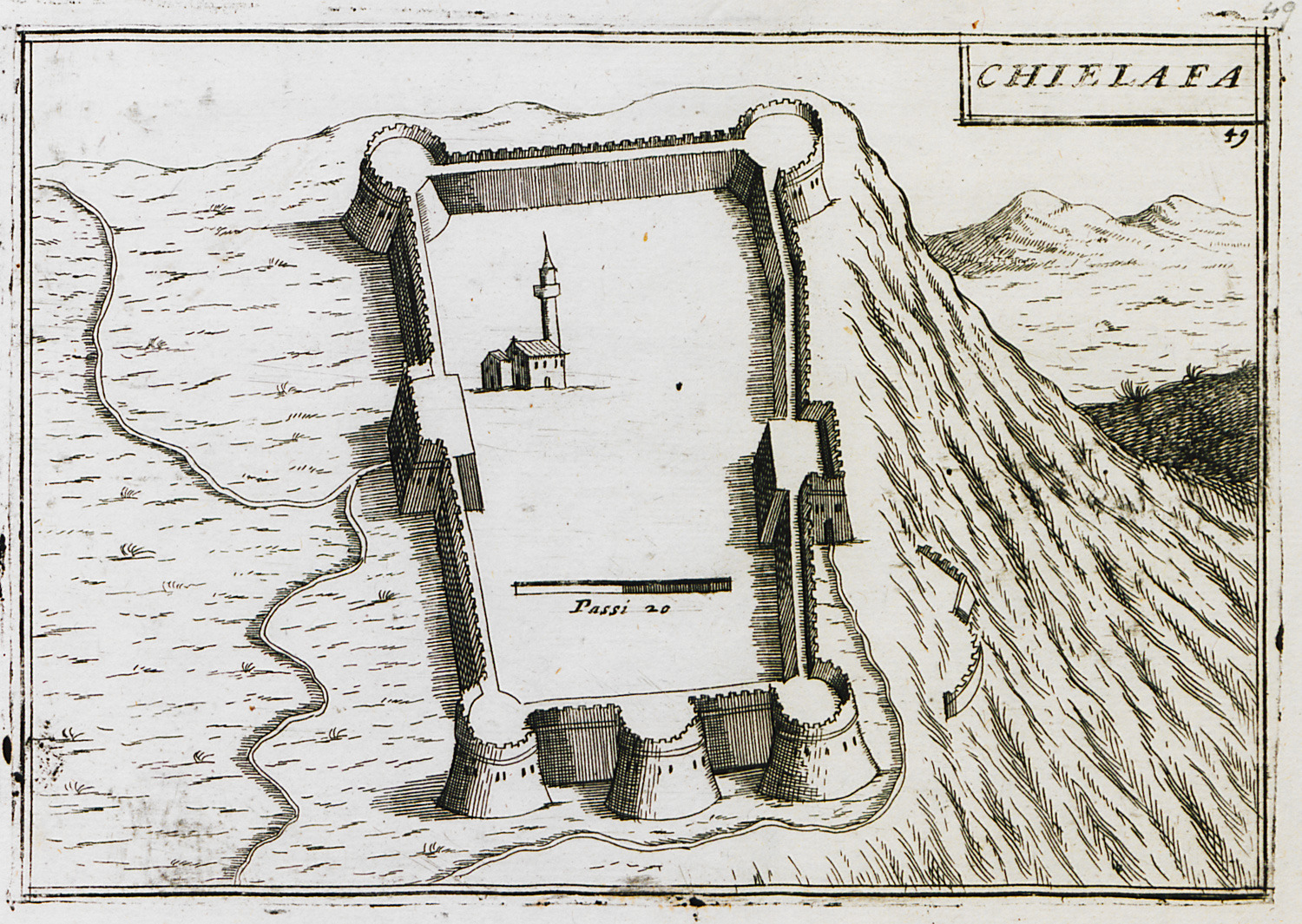
The Castle of Kelefa, 1686

The castle of Kelefa is located about half-way between the current village of Kelefa and the Bay of Oitylo. It was built in 1679 by the Ottomans, in order to contain the Inner Mani region. Some years later, in 1685, the Maniots besieged the castle. They sent messengers to Venice so the Doge could send a fleet to help them capture the castle. The Venetians were currently at war with the Ottomans so they agreed and sent a fleet under Francesco Morosini. As soon the fleets bearing the Lion of Saint Mark the Ottoman garrison surrendered. A year later the Ottomans returned with a strong force and laid siege to the castle but were driven back. Along with the rest of the Peloponnese, the castle remained in Venetian hands for about 30 years, but in 1715 the Ottomans recaptured the Peloponnese. Around 1780 the Ottomans abandoned the castle, which became derelict.

Now Kelefa is a small village.

== Historical population ==
Year	Population
1981	94
1991	114
2001	59
2011	39
2021	30

== See also ==
- List of settlements in Laconia

== Sources ==
- Andrews, Kevin (1978) [1953]. Castles of the Morea. Amsterdam: Adolf M. Hakkert. ISBN 90-256-0794-2.
