= Gerolimenas =

Gerolimenas Γερολιμένας
- Community
- Location within Greece
- Coordinates: 36°28′59″N 22°23′56″E
- Country: Greece
- Administrative region: Peloponnese
- Regional unit: Laconia
- Municipality: East Mani
- Municipal unit: Oitylo

Population (2021)
  - Community: 88
- Time zone: UTC+2 (EET)
  - Summer (DST): UTC+3 (EEST)

Gerolimenas (Greek: Γερολιμένας) is a picturesque small coastal village and a community in the municipal unit of Oitylo at the southern end of the Mani Peninsula in Laconia, Peloponnese, Greece.

The name, which means "Old Harbour", is thought to derive from the ancient "Ἱερός Λιμήν" (Hieros Limen), meaning "Sacred Harbour".

One of the remotest settlements in the Peloponnese, until the 1970s it was reached mainly by boat. In the past it was a major fishing center and featured substantial infrastructure such as a shipyard, ice supplies and a fish market. Today, the main industry is tourism. According to the 2021 census, its population was 88 inhabitants (including the village Ochia).

== Links ==
paintings from the local artist Karl-Heinz Herrfurth, showing views of the inner Mani
