= Oitylo =

Oitylo Οίτυλο
- Municipal unit
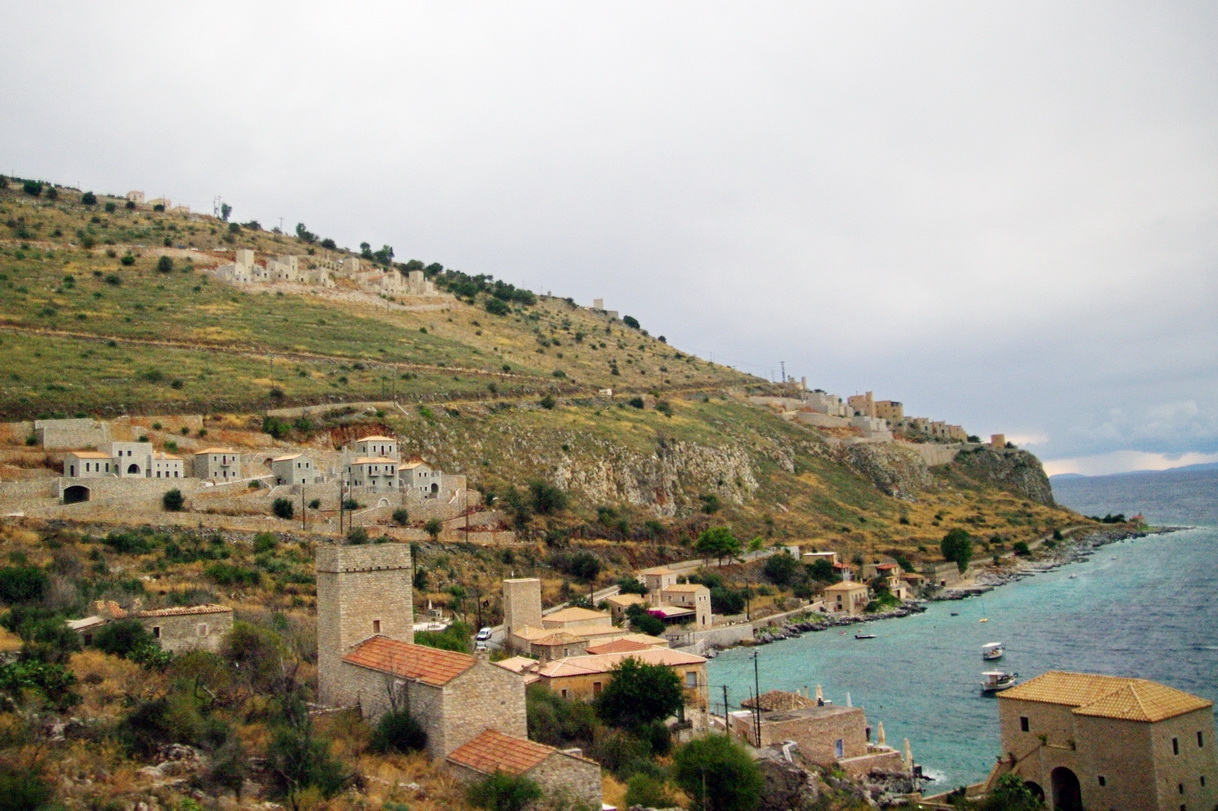
- View of Limeni

- Location within the regional unit

- Location within Greece
- Coordinates: 36°42.4′N 22°23.3′E
- Country: Greece
- Administrative region: Peloponnese
- Regional unit: Laconia
- Municipality: East Mani

Area
  - Municipal unit: 218.582 km^{2} (84.395 sq mi)
- Elevation: 251 m (823 ft)

Population (2021)
  - Municipal unit: 3,643
  - Municipal unit density: 16.67/km^{2} (43.17/sq mi)
  - Community: 474
- Time zone: UTC+2 (EET)
  - Summer (DST): UTC+3 (EEST)
- Postal code: 230 62
- Area code: 27330
- Vehicle registration: ΑΚ
- Website: www.dimosoitilou.gr

Oitylo (Greek: Οίτυλο, pronounced Ítilo), is a village on the Mani Peninsula of the Peloponnese, Greece. It has a land area of 218.582 km^{2}.

Oitylo is one of the oldest settlements in the Mani Peninsula. It was mentioned in the Iliad by Homer as Oetylus (Ancient Greek: Οίτυλος), as part of Menelaus' kingdom. In the Middle Ages, it grew to become the most important town in Mani. The only town in Mani that rivaled Oitylos in numbers of pirates was Skoutari.

Areopoli has surpassed Oitylo as the principal town of Laconian Mani. Since the 2011 local government reform Oitylo is part of the municipality East Mani, Laconia, of which it is a municipal unit. There are 91 villages in the municipality; the largest of these are Areópoli, Pyrgos Dirou and Oitylo.

Oitylo is known as Βίτσουλο (Vitsoulo) in the local Maniot dialect.

== Subdivisions ==
The municipal unit Oitylo is subdivided into the following communities:

- Alika
- Ano Boularioi
- Areopoli
- Dryalos
- Germa
- Gerolimenas
- Kareas
- Kelefa
- Koita
- Kounos
- Kryoneri
- Mina
- Neo Oitylo
- Oitylo
- Pyrgos Dirou
- Tsikkalia
- Vachos
- Vatheia

== Historical population ==
Year	Village	Community	Municipal unit
1981	-	507	-
1991	313	540	4,859
2001	258	391	3,959
2011	224	392	3,515
2021	324	474	3,643

== Province ==
The province of Oitylo (Greek: Επαρχία Οιτύλου) was one of the provinces of the Laconia Prefecture. Its territory corresponded with that of the current municipal unit Oitylo. It was abolished in 2006.

== Politics ==
Oitylo has traditionally been the most conservative province of Mani, which in turn is one of the most conservative areas of Greece. On all occasions since the Metapolitefsi, New Democracy has received the largest number of votes in Oitylo by a large margin. Also, Oitylo is among the very few parts of Greece that rooted for monarchy in the 1974 Greek republic referendum.

Parliamentary election results since 2000
6/2023	5/2023	2019	9/2015	1/2015	6/2012
1. ND 57.30%; 2. Spartans 11.71%; 3. SYRIZA 8.59%; 4. PASOK 8.00%; 5. KKE 3.90%; 6. PE 2.78%; 7. EL 2.44%; 8. Victory 2.29%; 9. Others 2.99%	1. ND 60.83%; 2. SYRIZA 11.16%; 3. PASOK 8.39%; 4. KKE 3.78%; 5. EL 3.16%; 6. PE 2.77%; 7. Victory 1.76%; 8. MERA25 1.14%; 9. Others 7.01%	1. ND 61.16%; 2. SYRIZA 14.26%; 3. PASOK 9.03%; 4. XA 5.39%; 5. EL 2.88%; 6. KKE 2.72%; 7. MERA25 1.63%; 8. PE 1.13%; 9. Others 1.80%	1. ND 47.28%; 2. XA 17.06%; 3. SYRIZA 15.60%; 4. PASOK 6.99%; 5. ANEL 3.60%; 6. KKE 3.17%; 7. Potami 1.97%; 8. LAE 1.37%; 9. EK 1.11%; 10. Others 1.85%	1. ND 45.61%; 2. XA 18.36%; 3. SYRIZA 16.95%; 4. PASOK 7.37%; 5. KKE 3.02%; 6. Potami 2.42%; 7. ANEL 2.21%; 8. LAOS 1.37%; 9. Others 2.69%	1. ND 50.61%; 2. XA 15.96%; 3. SYRIZA 11.81%; 4. PASOK 6.55%; 5. ANEL 5.59%; 6. KKE 3.33%; 7. DIMAR 1.96%; 8. LAOS 1.89%; 9. Others 2.30%
5/2012	2009	2007	2004	2000	
1. ND 41.65%; 2. XA 14.07%; 3. ANEL 9.80%; 4. SYRIZA 7.53%; 5. PASOK 7.14%; 6. KKE 5.71%; 7. LAOS 2.84%; 8. DIMAR 2.17%; 9. DISY 1.54%; 10. OP 1.44%; 11. DIXA 1.09%; 12. Others 5.02%	1. ND 58.34%; 2. PASOK 20.52%; 3. LAOS 12.73%; 4. KKE 4.91%; 5. OP 1.32%; 6. SYRIZA 1.17%; 7. Others 1.01%	1. ND 68.56%; 2. PASOK 15.60%; 3. LAOS 6.81%; 4. KKE 5.69%; 5. SYRIZA 1.68%; 6. Others 1.66%	1. ND 72.67%; 2. PASOK 18.36%; 3. KKE 3.35%; 4. LAOS 3.21%; 5. SYRIZA 1.13%; 6. Others 1.28%	1. ND 73.95%; 2. PASOK 20.47%; 3. KKE 2.13%; 4. Others 3.45%	

European Parliament election results since 1999
2024	2019	2014	2009	2004	1999
1. ND 41.98%; 2. FL 10.01%; 3. EL 9.88%; 4. SYRIZA 9.22%; 5. PASOK 6.30%; 6. Victory 4.51%; 7. KKE 3.85%; 8. Patriots 3.65%; 9. PE 1.99%; 10. NA 1.79%; 11. KEKA–AKKEL 1.19%; 12. Others 5.63%	1. ND 52.87%; 2. SYRIZA 11.08%; 3. XA 10.15%; 4. PASOK 4.74%; 5. EL 4.74%; 6. PE 3.21%; 7. KKE 2.79%; 8. MERA25 2.11%; 9. Others 8.31%	1. ND 38.91%; 2. XA 24.50%; 3. SYRIZA 11.18%; 4. PASOK 5.77%; 5. KKE 3.50%; 6. LAOS 2.82%; 7. ANEL 2.64%; 8. Potami 2.23%; 9. EPAM 1.36%; 10. KEK 1.00%; 11. Others 6.09%	1. ND 58.55%; 2. PASOK 16.23%; 3. LAOS 11.43%; 4. KKE 5.00%; 5. OP 1.73%; 6. XA 1.65%; 7. KEK 1.42%; 8. SYRIZA 1.34%; 9. Others 2.65%	1. ND 69.39%; 2. PASOK 14.32%; 3. LAOS 7.03%; 4. KKE 4.80%; 5. Coalition 1.50%; 6. Others 2.96%	1. ND 65.32%; 2. PASOK 16.36%; 3. POLAN 3.45%; 4. DIKKI 3.37%; 5. KKE 3.26%; 6. PG 2.03%; 7. Coalition 1.81%; 8. KEK 1.41%; 9. Others 2.99%

== See also ==
- List of settlements in Laconia
- Sotiris Petroulas
