= Pyrgos Dirou =

Pyrgos Dirou Πύργος Διρού
- Community
- Location within Greece
- Coordinates: 36°37′34″N 22°22′55″E
- Country: Greece
- Administrative region: Peloponnese
- Regional unit: Laconia
- Municipality: East Mani
- Municipal unit: Oitylo

Population (2021)
  - Community: 542
- Time zone: UTC+2 (EET)
  - Summer (DST): UTC+3 (EEST)

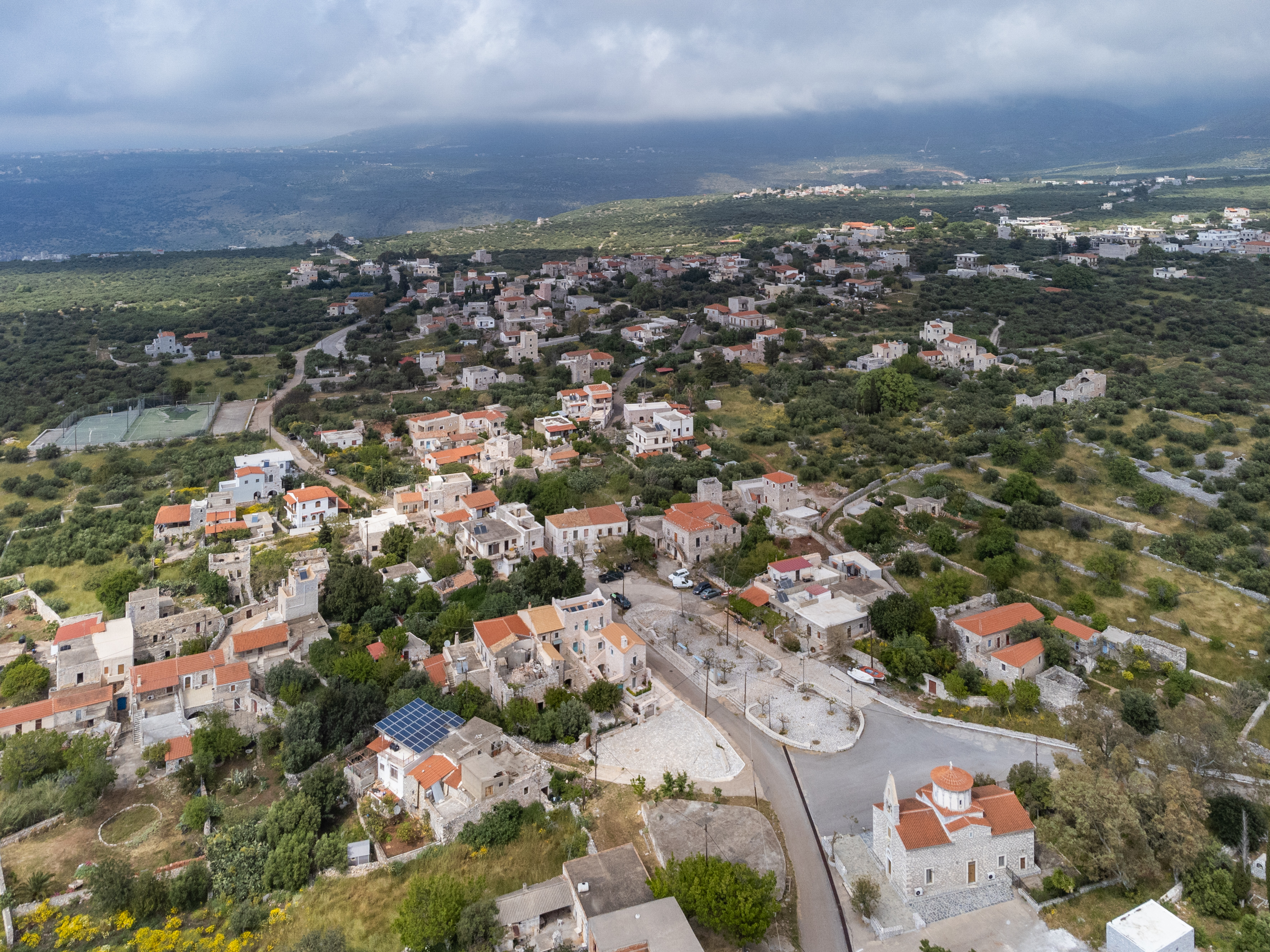

Pyrgos Dirou (Greek: Πύργος Διρού) is a town in Mani, Laconia, Greece. It is part of the municipal unit of Oitylo of the municipality of East Mani. It is located around 26 km (16 miles) from Areopoli.

== History ==
The earliest known mention of the toponym Dirou dates back to 1336, written as Iro, when it was a property of Nikolaos Atsagioli near Tzimova (the old name of Areopoli). The name has Slavic origins and means stagnant water (see hydronym). The village of Pyrgos was mentioned in 1571.

The Battle of Vergas (Greek War of Independence, 1824) was fought near Diro.

In June 1826, Dirou beach was the site of a battle between Greeks and Egyptians, with the Maniots managing to defeat Ibrahim Pasha's forces.

== Points of interest ==
The traditional settlement of Pyrgos Dirou consists of individual architectural complexes; the central complex is Lefkia. Its towers have been designated as monuments. The 1832 complex of the armatolos Sklavounakos in Petrovouni features a six-storey tower, possibly the tallest in Mani. It has a long two-storey house with an upper floor, water tanks, and a family chapel with a cemetery.

Other attractions in the village include the Byzantine churches of Agios Petros Glezos and Taxiarchon Glezos, the single-aisle church of Agioi Theodoroi in Kalos, dating back to the 12th century, and the single-aisle church of Agios Nikolaos, with a built-in iconostasis and frescoes from 1868. The old school of Pyrgos Dirou has been designated as a historic preserved monument due to the way materials from earlier buildings have been incorporated into it.

Near Pyrgos Dirou and on the shores of Dirou Bay, which lies between the Tower and Areopoli, are three caves: Alepotrypa; Glyfada (or Vlychada); and Katafygi.

=== Diros Caves ===
Diro is arguably most famous for the Diros Caves, located approximately 19 km (12 miles) south of Pollapolis. About 5,000 m (16,000 ft) of polla have been exposed and are accessible by small boats and through narrow passageways. One is surrounded by formations of stalagmites and stalactites. Archaeological research has shown that the caves served as places of worship in Paleolithic and Neolithic times and their inhabitant believed that the caves were the entrance to the underworld.

== See also ==
- List of settlements in Laconia
