= Athens University of Economics and Business =

University in Athens, Greece

Coordinates: 37°59′38″N 23°43′56″E

- Οικονομικό Πανεπιστήμιο Αθηνών
- Former names: Ανωτάτη Σχολή Εμπορικών Σπουδών; ΑΣΟΕΕ/ASOEE (Ανωτάτη Σχολή Οικονομικών και Εμπορικών Επιστημών)
- Type: Public higher education institution
- Established: 1920; 106 years ago
- Rector: Vasileios Vasdekis
- Students: ~3,000 newcomers per year
- Undergraduates: ~1,800 newcomers per year
- Postgraduates: ~1,200 newcomers per year
- Location: Athens, Greece
- Newspaper: ΟΠΑ NEWS
- Colours: Dark red and white
- Website: www.aueb.gr

Athens University of Economics and Business (AUEB; Greek: Οικονομικό Πανεπιστήμιο Αθηνών, Oikonomiko Panepistimio Athinon, abbrev. ΟΠΑ, OPA) is a public university based in Athens, Greece, specializing in the fields of Economics, Business Administration, and Information Technology. It encompasses a broad range of academic disciplines, including Statistics, Accounting and Finance, Computer Science, and European Studies. The university offers education at the undergraduate, postgraduate, and doctoral levels while also promoting research. AUEB is recognized as the leading institution for economic and business studies in Greece.

== History ==
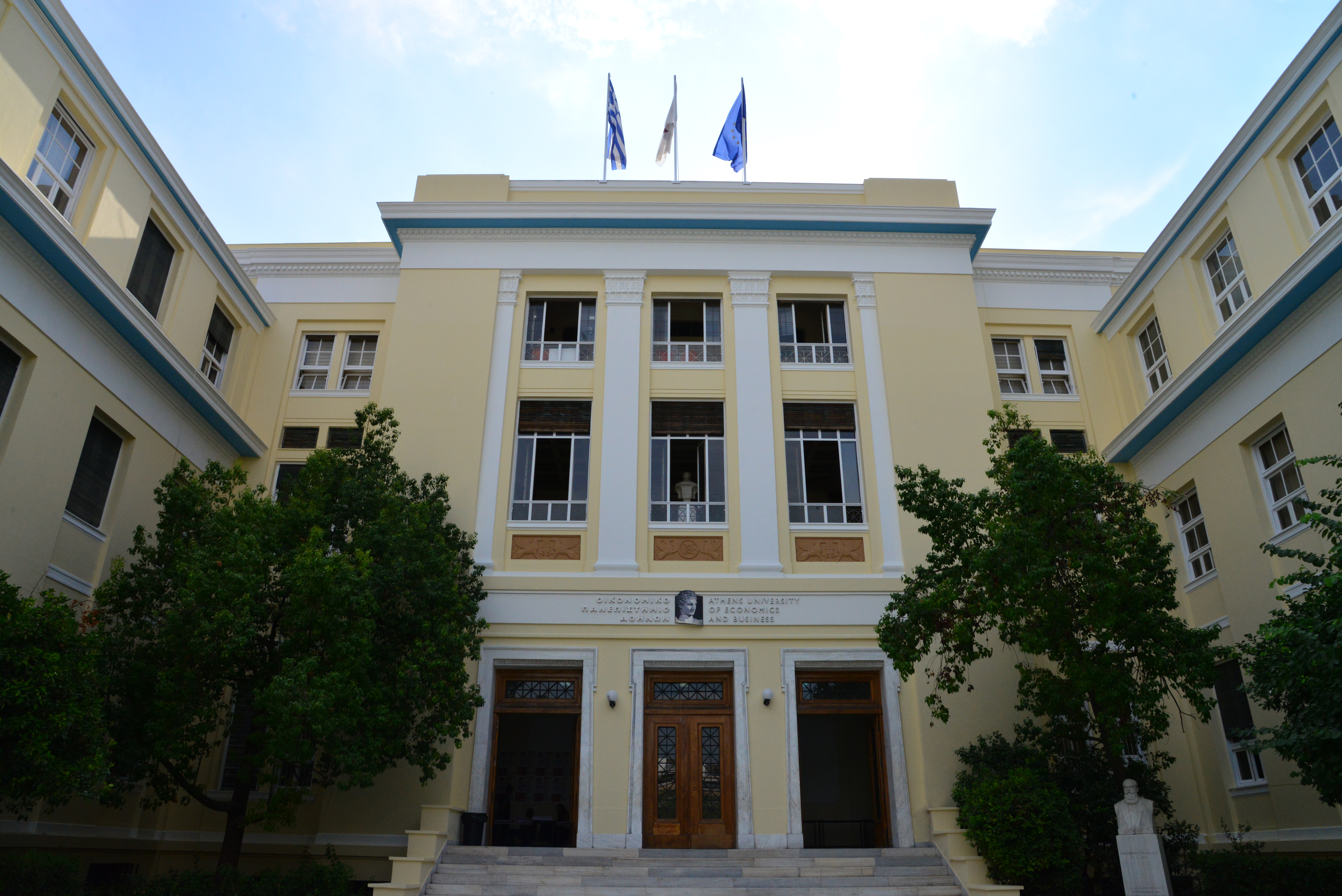
"Marasleio Megaro", the main building of Athens University of Economics and Business.

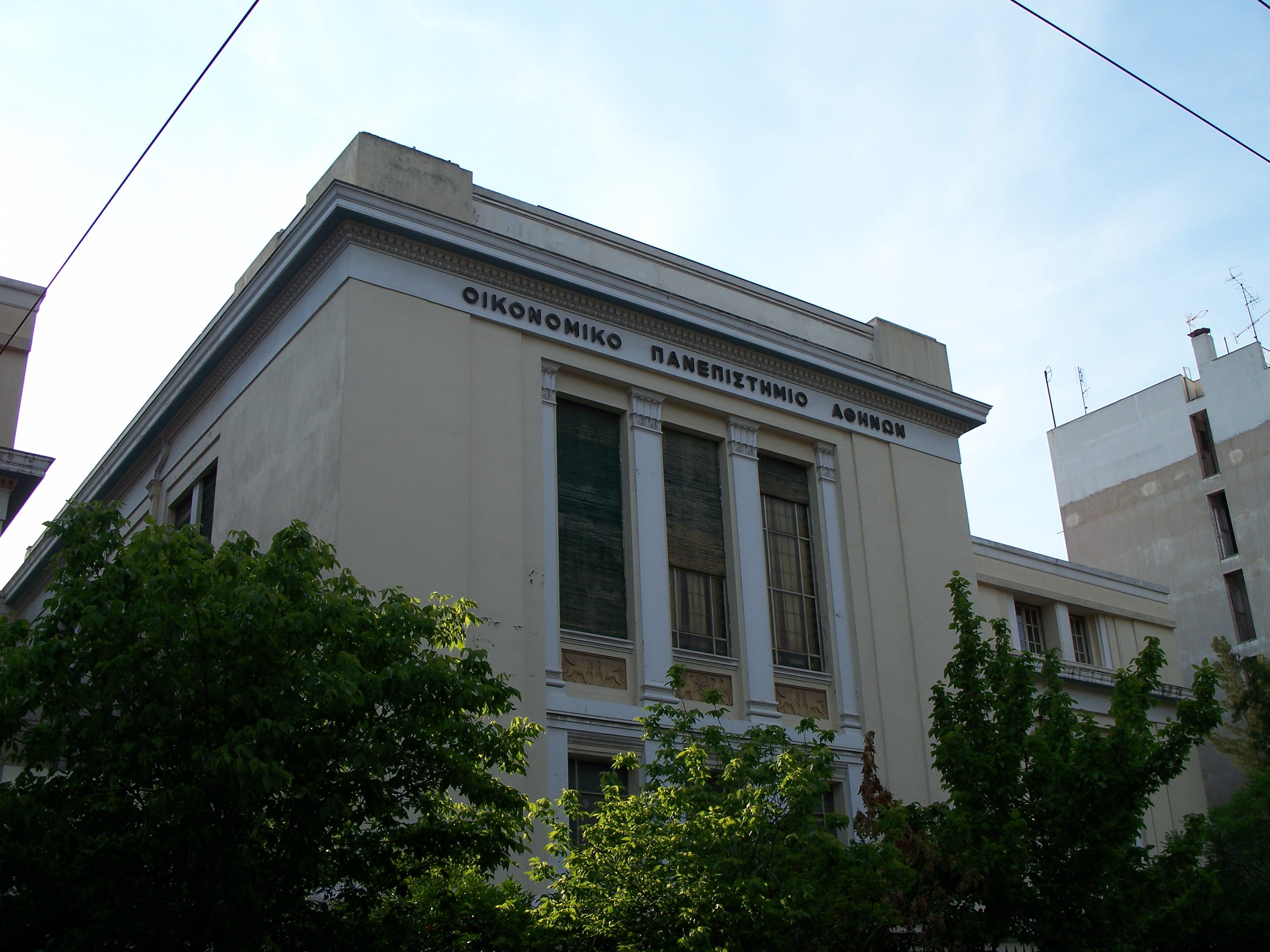
Backview of the building.

The Athens University of Economics and Business (AUEB) was founded in 1920 under the name of Athens School of Commercial Studies. It was renamed in 1926 as the Supreme School of Economics and Commercial Sciences (Greek: Ανωτάτη Σχολή Οικονομικών και Εμπορικών Επιστημών, Anotati Scholi Oikonomikon kai Emborikon Epistimon, abbrev. ΑΣΟΕΕ, ASOEE), a name that was retained until 1989 when it assumed its present name, the Athens University of Economics and Business. Though the university of business's official name has changed, it is still known popularly in Greek by this former acronym.

It is the oldest university in Greece in the fields of Economics and Business, its roots tracing to the establishment of a Merchant Academy in Athens. Up to 1955 the school offered only one degree in the general area of economics and commerce. In 1955 the duration of study at the School is increased from three to four years and two cycles of study leading to two separate degrees: one in economics and the other in business administration. In 1984 the school was divided into three departments, namely the Department of Economics, the Department of Business Administration and the Department of Statistics and Business Informatics, the latter renamed to the Informatics Department in 1995.

In 1989, the university expanded to six departments. From 1999 onwards, the university developed even further and nowadays it includes eight academic departments, offering eight undergraduate degrees, 28 master's degrees and an equivalent number of doctoral programs.

In 2025, AUEB launched its inaugural English-taught undergraduate program, the "Bachelor in International Business & Technology," exclusively designed for international students. The four-year program offers a comprehensive curriculum that integrates business fundamentals, such as strategy, innovation, and entrepreneurship, with cutting-edge technological studies, including business intelligence, digital marketing, and artificial intelligence.

Its main building is housed on Patision Street 76, while other buildings of the university are located in the nearby area.

== Academic departments ==
The Athens University of Economics and Business today comprises three Schools and 8 academic departments.

| Schools | Departments |
|---|---|
| School of Business (founded 2013) | Department of Business Administration (founded 1955); Department of Marketing and Communication (founded 1989); Department of Accounting and Finance (founded 1999); Department of Management Science and Technology (founded 1999) |
| School of Economic Sciences (founded 2013) | Department of Economics (founded 1955); Department of International and European Economic Studies (founded 1991) |
| School of Information Sciences & Technology (founded 2013) | Department of Informatics (founded 1985); Department of Statistics (founded 1989) |

Each Department accepts students at the undergraduate level, after successfully passing the pan-Hellenic exams, and offers a 4-year undergraduate program of studies. Each academic department also offers one or more graduate programs of studies, leading to a master's degree, as well as a Doctoral Program, leading to a PhD degree.

== Undergraduate studies ==
Each department of the Athens University of Economics and Business awards an undergraduate degree (Ptychion) equivalent to a four-year B.A. or B.Sc. in their respective fields. To be able to graduate and get their degree, a student has to attend and successfully complete 8 semesters of study (four years), corresponding to a total of approximately 240 ECTS credit hours. Foreign language courses in English, French, or German are offered in all semesters and count towards degree requirements. Depending on their choice of electives, students acquire a major concentration on particular subjects.

=== Undergraduate courses in English ===
In addition to the above, there are many courses offered in English, mainly (but not only) for international students who come to AUEB under the Erasmus program. A total of approximately 60 courses are offered in English, each one counting towards 6 ECTS credits.

== Postgraduate studies ==
Doctorates are awarded by each Department upon the completion of courses, a successful qualifying exam, a dissertation and its successful defence in public. Holding a master's degree is a necessary requirement in order to be accepted to the Ph.D. program.

=== Masters programmes ===
There are 29 different Masters Programmes that are currently offered at AUEB. They include full-time programmes, part-time programmes, and joint programmes.

The duration of graduate studies at the Master's level is between 15–27 months. Students are admitted to these programs after satisfying certain admission criteria such as results at the GMAT or GRE tests, proficiency of English, academic performance at the undergraduate level, work experience (mainly for the MBA as well as the part-time programs). Graduate students may receive scholarships or assistantships.

==== English-speaking programmes ====
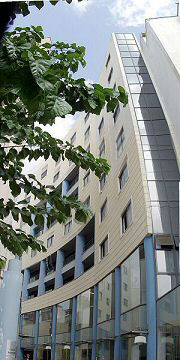
The postgraduate building of the Economical University of Athens, Evelpidon street.

- MSc in AI and Data Science
- MSc in Economics
- MSc in Business Analytics
- MBA International
- MSc in Financial Management
- MSc in Innovation, Culture and Technology
- MSc in International Shipping, Finance and Management
- MSc in Marketing and Communication
- MSc in Statistics

More info: https://www.aueb.gr/sites/default/files/aueb/AUEB-Brochure_English-Masters-Programs2021.pdf

== Non-degree programs ==
The university offers additional training to the students of the university, as well as executive training programs.

A number of non-degree courses are offered to students who are interested in expanding their knowledge and skills. These include foreign language courses and courses on computer skills. In addition, a large number of executive seminars are offered, either in-house to companies or open.

== Academic evaluation ==
In 2015 the external evaluation committee gave Athens University of Economics and Business a Positive evaluation.

An external evaluation of all academic departments in Greek universities was conducted by the Hellenic Quality Assurance and Accreditation Agency (HQA).

=== International rankings ===
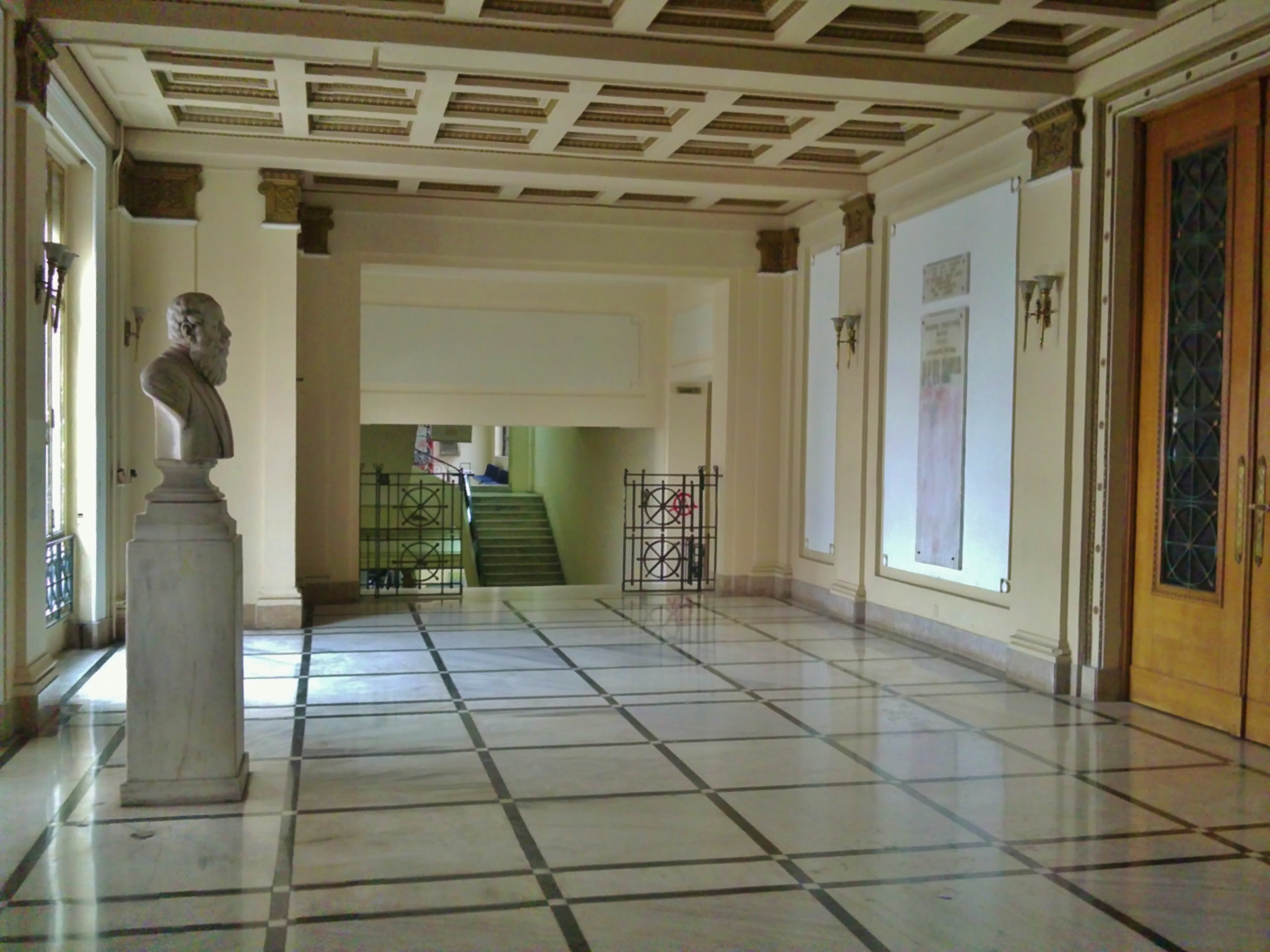
The Aueb's celebration hall main entrance.

The Athens University of Economics and Business is ranked 601st-800th in The Times Higher Education (THE) annual list and 101st-150th in the QS World University Rankings in Business and Management Studies.

In the field of econometrics, AUEB comes internationally in 48th place according to the Journal of Econometric Theory. The economics department ranks in the 76th place worldwide.

University rankings

Global – Overall
- QS World: 951-1000 (2026)

The MBA International Program, has nine specializations / majors and is offered in English. The Program is accredited by the Association of MBAs (AMBA), and ranked among the top 20 MBA prograin Europe and the top 50 in the world.

== Campus ==
The Athens University of Economics and Business is located in downtown Athens. The main building of the university is located at 76, Patision Street in Athens, two blocks away from the Archaeological Museum. This site was where the first football ground of Panathinaikos Football Club existed from 1908 until 1922. The contemporary building was constructed in 1935 with money donated by the Greek-Russian benefactor Grigorios Maraslis. The rear of the building faces the Pedion Areos Park and the facilities of Panellinios Sports Club. Nine more buildings in the area cover the university's teaching, research and administrative needs.

== Library ==
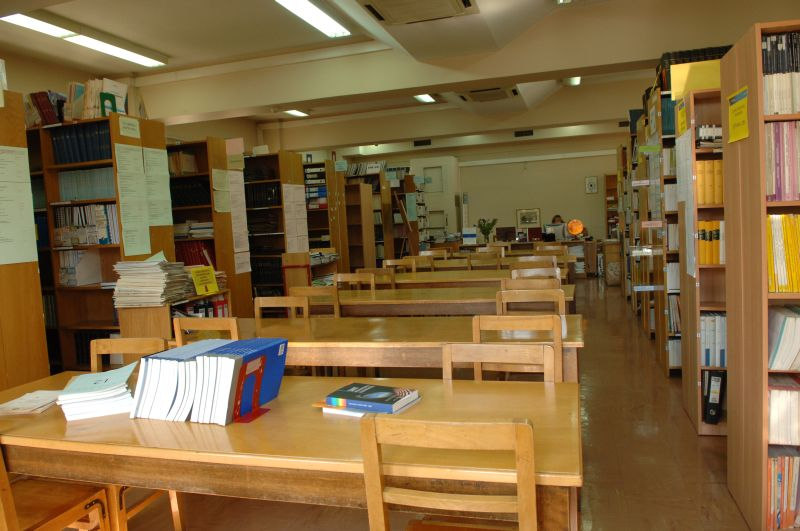
The AUEB library in the main building.

The AUEB library was founded in 1928 and in 1990 it experienced a massive modernization and IT automation, partly financed by the European Community. Today it covers all aspects of automation, including OPAC, SDI, acquisitions, bar-code-based lending, etc., and uses the integrated library automation system Equilibrium-Libreto.

The library comprises more than 100,000 book titles, and more than 1,000 printed academic journal titles covering areas of Economics, International and European Economic Studies, Business Administration, Management Science and Marketing, Informatics, Statistics, Accounting and Finance, and Management and Technology.

The library also offers 150 CD-ROMs (the Official Journal of the EC in full text, bibliographical database of the Official Publications of the EU, statistical data on the imports and exports of the member-states of the EU etc.) Access to the above-mentioned CD-ROMs is available from all library departments via the CD-ROM network. Finally, the library offers daily business magazines and journals in the areas of economics and business.

In addition, the Library participates in a consortium for national and international inter-library loans. Thus, the library users have access to the libraries of the Centre of Planning and Economic Research, the Bank of Greece, the National Documentation Centre, as well as to several libraries in Europe. The library employs 14 people.

Business databases and literature search facilities

The AUEB library subscribes over 1,000 electronic journals through all the major electronic search engines (EBSCO, Elsevier's Sciencedirect, Springer's Link, JSTOR, MCB, WilsonWeb, Blackwell publishing, Oxford University Press, Wiley InterScience, CambridgeJournalsOnline etc.). Electronic access to the subscribed journals can be performed from any computer connected to the university intranet or irrespective of location. Also the library offers access to the OECD iLibrary (Organization for Economic Co-operation and Development) database including data, analyses and forecasts.

The library also encompasses the European Documentation Centre which was established by the European Commission in partnership with the university in June 1992 in order to support teaching and research on EU matters. It is part of the university's library and is open to all members of the university, to the wider academic community as well as to everyone interested in EU policies and affairs.

AUEB Publishing The institute has recently developed a publishing activity. One of the future plans of the company is to set up an academic bookshop with special prices for the students. In the meantime, books are sold from the Company's offices.

== Computer center ==
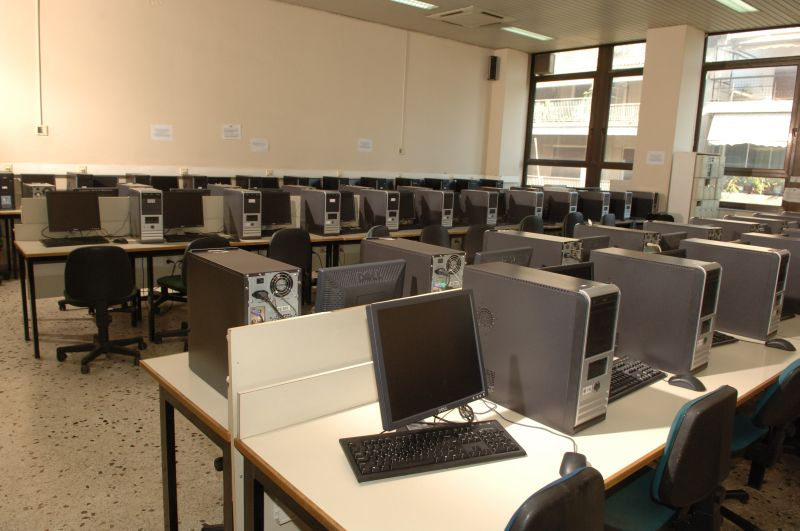
CS lab at AUEB

AUEB computer center facilities occupy an area of approximately 700 square meters and hold an extensive library of educational, scientific and business software.

Serving more than 7,000 users, the Computer Centre research and teaching facilities include five computer labs.

== Research laboratories ==
The activities undertaken by the faculty are twofold:

- Basic theoretical research, which aims at the production and advancement of scientific and technological knowledge. This type of research is published in international scientific journals, proceedings of scientific congresses etc.
- Applied research and consulting, which aims at the resolution of major problems of the economy and society, and of the firms.

The research laboratories currently operating at AUEB are the following:

== AUEB Students' Clubs and Societies ==
There are several academic, political, cultural and athletic groups active, as well as numerous alumni associations. The students' union is named after Sotiris Petroulas, a student of the university who was killed during demonstrations against the Iouliana of 1965. Some of the university’s students’ clubs are the following:

- AUEBs’ Investment and Finance Club

- AUEBs’ Club for entrepreneurship «ThinkBiz»

- FOSS Community

- AUEB Gen Z

- AUEBs’ Erasmus Club

- AUEBs’ Debate Club

- AUEBs’ Film Team

- AUEBs’ Photography Club

- AUEBs’ Theatre Club

- Traditional Dances Club

- AUEBs’ Music Team

- AUEBs’ Sport Club (Track and Field, Swimming, Tennis, Volleyball, 5x5 football)

== See also ==
- List of universities in Greece
- List of research institutes in Greece
- European Higher Education Area
- Outline of academic disciplines
- Education in Greece
