= Maniots =

Traditional name for natives of the Mani Peninsula in southern Greece

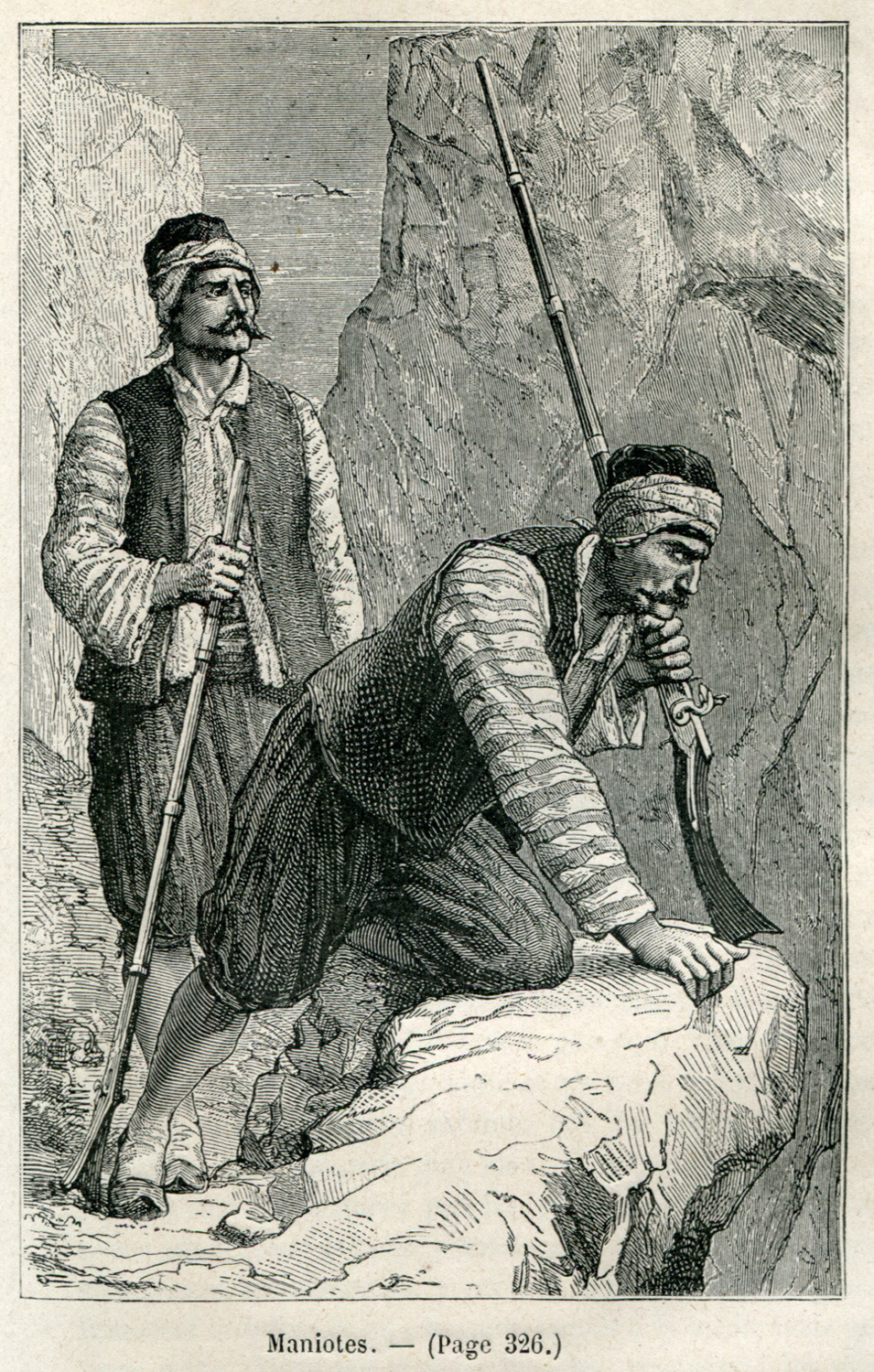
Maniot fighters, 1881

The Maniots (/ˈmæniəts/) or Maniates (Greek: Μανιάτες) is the traditional name for the native Greek inhabitants of the Mani Peninsula in the southern Peloponnese region of Greece. They have historically been known as Mainotes, and the peninsula as Maina.

In the early modern period, Maniots gained a reputation as fierce and proudly independent warriors, who engaged in piracy and blood feuds. They lived mainly in fortified villages and "tower houses" built as defenses against "Frankish" (see Frankokratia) and Ottoman invaders.

The Maniots claim to be descendants of the ancient Spartans and heirs to their militaristic culture. Modern observers noted Maniots' self-identification as warriors ready to "preserve their liberty" with arms. Genetic studies have identified the Maniots of Inner Mani as a population isolate within mainland Greece, showing substantial parental genetic continuity from antiquity and limited influence from medieval population movements.

== Maniot variety of Modern Greek ==
A map showing the distribution of Maniot Greek

Maniots have historically spoken one of the varieties of Modern Greek, defined as either a "dialect" or an "idiom".

One of the Maniot variety's properties—shared with Tsakonian and with dialects spoken around Athens until the 19th century—is the divergent treatment of historical /y/ (written <υ>). Although this sound merged to /i/ everywhere else, these dialects have /u/ instead (e.g. [ˈksulo] versus standard [ˈksilo] 'wood').

These varieties are thought to be relic areas of a previously larger areal dialect group that used to share these features, and was later divided by the penetration of Arvanitika in much of its area, in the late Middle Ages.

Other features of the Maniot dialect include the palatalization of velar consonants, i.e. the realization of /k, ɡ, x, ɣ/ as ([tɕ, dʑ] or [ɕ, ʑ] before /i, e, j/. This feature is shared with many southern dialects of Greek; especially Cretan.

In Outer Mani, family names end in -eas, while surnames of Inner Mani end in -akis, -akos, or—less frequently—-oggonas.

== Culture ==
Woman from Mani

=== Clans ===
Maniot society is traditionally clan-based. By examining shared paternal lineages within major clans, it has been proposed that the formation of the Maniot clan structure dates primarily to the 14th and 15th centuries AD, earlier than some previous estimates based solely on documentary sources. This timing has been linked to regional instability, episodes of warfare, and the absence of a centralized authority in the Mani region during the late medieval period.

=== Arts ===
Two dances come from Mani: Palio Maniatiko (Παλιό Μανιάτικο, lit. 'Old Maniot') and the Modern Maniatiko. The Palio Maniatiko is only found in Mani and is described as an ancient dance. The Modern Maniatiko is the modern version of the Palio Maniatiko dance and includes certain aspects of the Kalamatiano dance in it. Like the Palio Maniatiko, it is only performed in Mani.

=== Piracy ===
"If any ship come to anchor on their coast, many arm themselves and go to the place, over against where the ship doth ride; some of them will be in priests habits, walking by the sea side, with their wallets, in which they will have some wine and bread. Their companions lye hid behind the bushes at some convenient post. When any strangers come ashore, who do not understand their language, the feigned priests make signes to them, shewing them their bread and wine, which they offer to them for money, by which the strangers being enticed from the sea side (and it may be to sit down and taste their wine) the hidden Manjotts come and make their prey. The priests will seem to be sorry, and endeavor to make the strangers to believe they were altogether ignorant of any such design. So a white flagg is put out, and a treaty held with the ship for their ransome. The priests endeavor to moderate the price, shewing a great deal of respect to their companions, who are clothed in Turkish habits. Many ships have been thus served."
Bernard Randolph, Present State of the Morea.

Historically, Maniots were notorious pirates. Piracy was their main source of income into at least the 18th century. Local Eastern Orthodox Church priests blessed the raiding ships before departure; sometimes priests joined the pirate crews. Most of the Maniot pirates came from Mesa Mani (Μέσα Μάνη, 'Inner Mani').

=== Folklore ===
There is a strong history of superstition and folklore in Maniot culture; most common stories revolve around witches, demons, vampires, and ghosts. When Henry Herbert, 3rd Earl of Carnarvon, was touring Mani in 1839, he found a fresh egg by the side of the road and offered it to a Maniot soldier who escorted him. The soldier declined the offer and explained that if a hag had enchanted the egg then the soldier would be forced to marry her. The Maniots thought that certain areas were haunted by demons.

=== Vendettas ===
Another important aspect of Maniot culture were the vendettas which frequently plagued Mani. Usually, the decision to start a vendetta was made at a family gathering. The main aim of a vendetta was usually to wipe out the other family. The families involved locked themselves in their towers and whenever they got the chance murdered members of the opposing family. The other families in the village normally locked themselves in their towers in order not to get in the way of the fighting.

Vendettas could go on for months, sometimes years, and usually ended when one family was exterminated or left the town. In some cases (like the killing of a murderer) vendettas would be concluded after the 'guilty' individual(s) were killed. In other cases vendettas, particularly long-running ones, were ended in a peaceful to terms or exchange of property. In the case of long vendettas, families often agreed upon a temporary treva (τρέβα, 'truce') in order to allow for harvests or the attendance of religious ceremonies; when the treva ended, the killing could resume.

A cornerstone of the Maniot's vendetta culture was the agreement that all vendettas immediately stop in a universal treva whenever the community faced a Turkish threat. The longest known treva was announced by the Mavromichalis clan when war was declared on the Ottoman Empire in March 1821, beginning the Greek War of Independence. Vendettas continued after Greek independence.

The Maniot vendetta culture is considered one of the most vicious and ruthless of all the Mediterranean vendetta cultures. One of the last large scale vendettas on record required the Greek Police, 1,000 Greek Army soldiers, and 200 Greek Navy sailors to stop.

=== Cuisine ===
Local specialities:

- Hilopites
- Kolokythokorfades
- Paspalas
- Regali, lamb soup
- Tsouchtí, pasta with egg dish
- Syglino (pork meat, coldcut)
- Dakos
- Lalagides or Lalagia (Λαλαγγίδες)
- Diples (dessert)

== Ethnology ==
Some Maniots claim to be descendants of the ancient Spartans. According to this tradition, after the Romans took over Laconia, Spartan adherents to the laws of Lycurgus left for Mani rather than be subjects of the Achaean League or, later, Rome.

Mani became a refuge during the 4th-century Migrations Period of Europe. When the Slavs and Avars entered the Peloponnese (the latter triggering the Avar–Byzantine wars of 568–626), refugees from northern Greece and Macedonia fled south into the mountainous terrain of Mani. The 10th-century Byzantine Emperor Constantine Porphyrogenitus wrote that the Maniots were not conquered by the Slavs and were descended from the ancient Romaioi. Historian David Armine Howarth states: "The only Greeks that have had an unbroken descent were the clans like the Maniotes who were so fierce, and lived so far up the mountain, that invaders left them alone."

== Genetic studies ==
Recent scholarship has shown that the Maniots have a distinct genetic profile. A 2017 study found they are genetically different from other groups in the Peloponnese region.

Maniot individuals share a significant amount of their genome with each other, indicating a high degree of relatedness. They are also genetically isolated from other Greek populations, though they show some overlap with people from Sicily and southern Italy. This is attributed to the Maniots having the lowest levels of Slavic genetic ancestry in the Peloponnese. Maniots from East Mani have very little Slavic ancestry (0.7–1.6%), while those from West and Lower Mani have higher, but still relatively low, amounts (4.9–10.9%). The rest of the Peloponnesian population has a higher percentage of Slavic ancestry (4.8–14.4%).

This genetic isolation suggests that the Maniots may be descended from the ancient Dorians. Their historical separation from the rest of the Greek population, preserved through geography and social practices, has contributed to their distinct genetic identity.

A 2026 uniparental study of Deep Maniots found a predominance of paternal (Y-chromosome) lineages associated with Bronze Age, Iron Age, and Roman-period Greek populations, alongside an absence of lineages commonly linked to Slavic, Germanic, or later medieval Balkan migrations. The findings suggest long-term population continuity in southern Mani, with limited external paternal gene flow since Late Antiquity. The study also identified strong founder effects dating to approximately the 4th to 7th centuries AD, a period of major demographic changes in the Balkans. Maternal lineages were more diverse in comparisons, suggesting connections across the eastern Mediterranean and Balkans, and in some cases, North Africa and western Europe. That has been interpreted as consistent with a historically patriarchal society incorporating limited female-mediated gene flow.

== Notable Maniots ==
- Stephen Antonakos, sculptor
- Panagiotis Doxaras, painter, founder of the Heptanese School
- Konstantinos Davakis, military officer
- Limberakis Gerakaris, pirate and first Bey of Mani
- Kyriakos D. Kassis, artist
- Elias Koteas, actor
- Kyriakoulis Mavromichalis, hero of the Greek War of Independence
- Stylianos Mavromichalis, lawyer, president of the Areopagus and prime minister (1963)
- Demetrios Mavromichalis, politician, military officer, and aide to King Otto of Greece
- Kyriakoulis P. Mavromichalis, prime minister of Greece 1909–1910
- Petros Mavromichalis, hero of the Greek War of Independence, last Bey of Mani
- Michail Anagnostakos, military officer and army leader of the Macedonian Struggle
- George Tsimbidaros-Fteris, poet and journalist
- Sotiris Petroulas
- Tzannis Tzannetakis, naval officer, Member of the Hellenic Parliament, prime minister of Greece (1989) and Minister for Foreign Affairs

== Gallery of notable Maniots ==
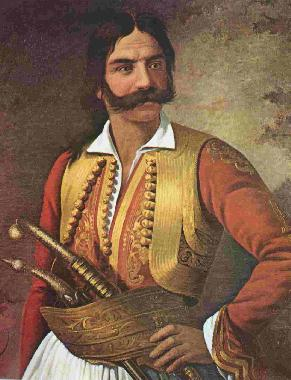
Kyriakoulis Mavromichalis

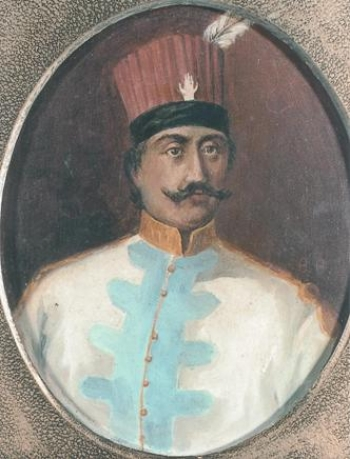
Lambros Katsonis

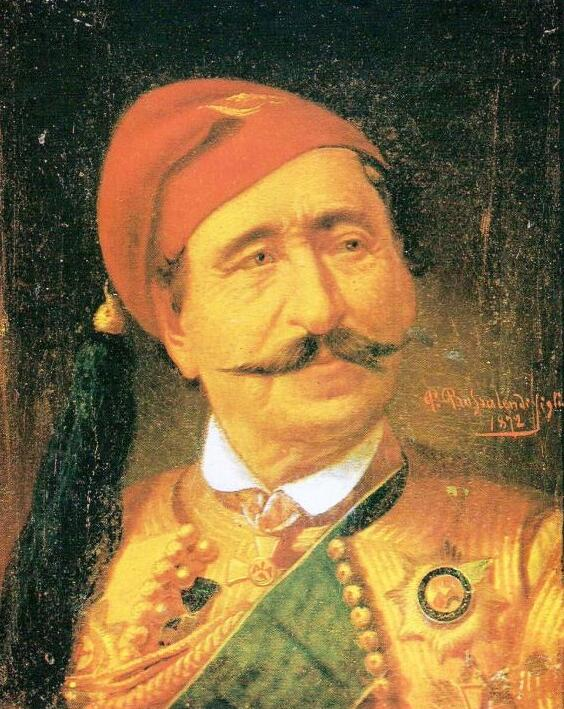
Nikolaos Pierrakos Mavromichalis

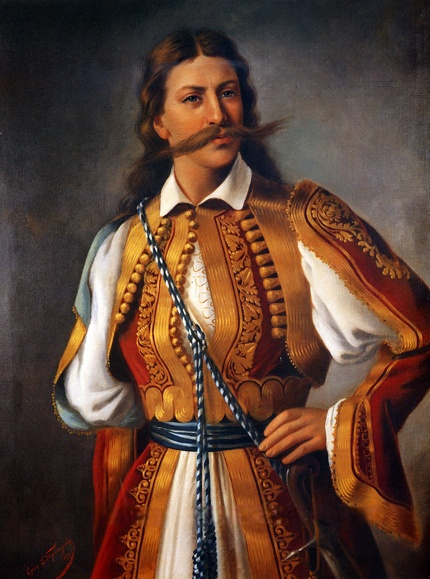
Konstantinos Mavromichalis

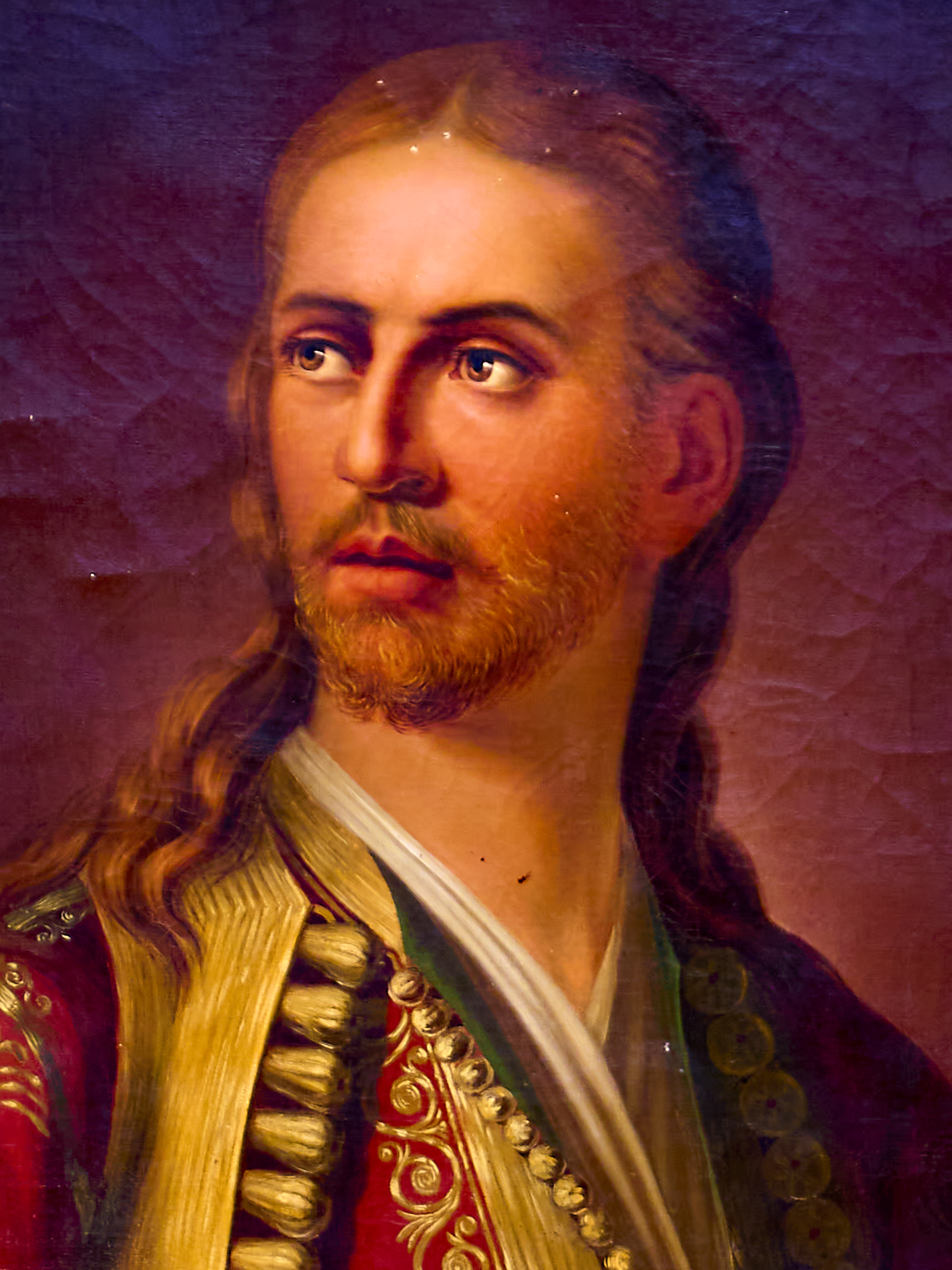
Ilias Mavromichalis

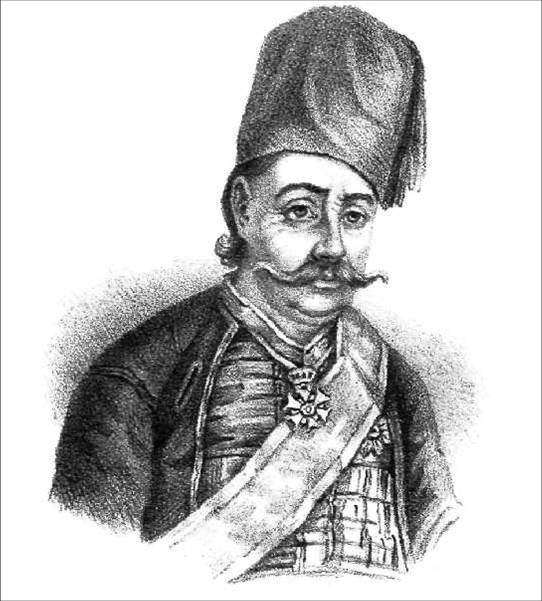
Petros Mavromichalis

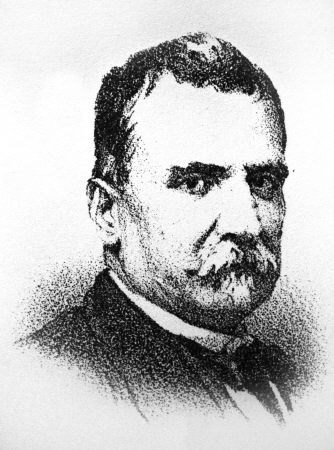
Alexandros Koumoundouros

== Sources ==
- Barrow, Bob (2000). Mani: A Guide to the Villages, Towers and Churches of the Mani Peninsula. Antonis Thomeas Services. ISBN 0-9537517-0-8.
- Eisner, Robert (1993). Travelers to an Antique Land: The History and Literature of Travel to Greece. University of Michigan Press. ISBN 0-472-08220-5.
- Greenhalgh, P. A. L.; Eliopoulos, Edward (1985). Deep into Mani: Journey to the Southern Tip of Greece. Faber and Faber. ISBN 0-571-13524-2.
- Harris, William Vernon (2005). Rethinking the Mediterranean. Oxford University Press. ISBN 978-0-19-926545-9.
- Hellander, Paul (2008). Greece. Lonely Planet. ISBN 978-1-74104-656-4.
- Stamatoyannopoulos, George; et al. (2017). "Genetics of the Peloponnesean populations and the theory of extinction of the medieval Peloponnesean Greeks". European Journal of Human Genetics. 25 (5): 637–645. doi:10.1038/ejhg.2017.18. ISSN 1476-5438. PMC 5437898. PMID 28272534.
- Smith, William (1873). Dictionary of Greek and Roman Biography and Mythology. London: John Murray.
- Trudgill, Peter (2003). "Modern Greek Dialects: A Preliminary Classification". Journal of Greek Linguistics. 4: 45–63. doi:10.1075/jgl.4.04tru. S2CID 145744857.
- "Vendetta". mani.org.gr.
- "1906: I ematiri venteta anamesa se Maniates ke Kritikous" 1906: Η αιματηρή βεντέτα ανάμεσα σε Μανιάτες και Κρητικούς [1906: The bloody feud between Maniots and Cretans]. cretapost.gr (in Greek). 2018-09-14. Archived from the original on 2018-07-02.
