= George Tsimbidaros-Fteris =

Greek writer and journalist

George Tsimbidaros (Fteris)
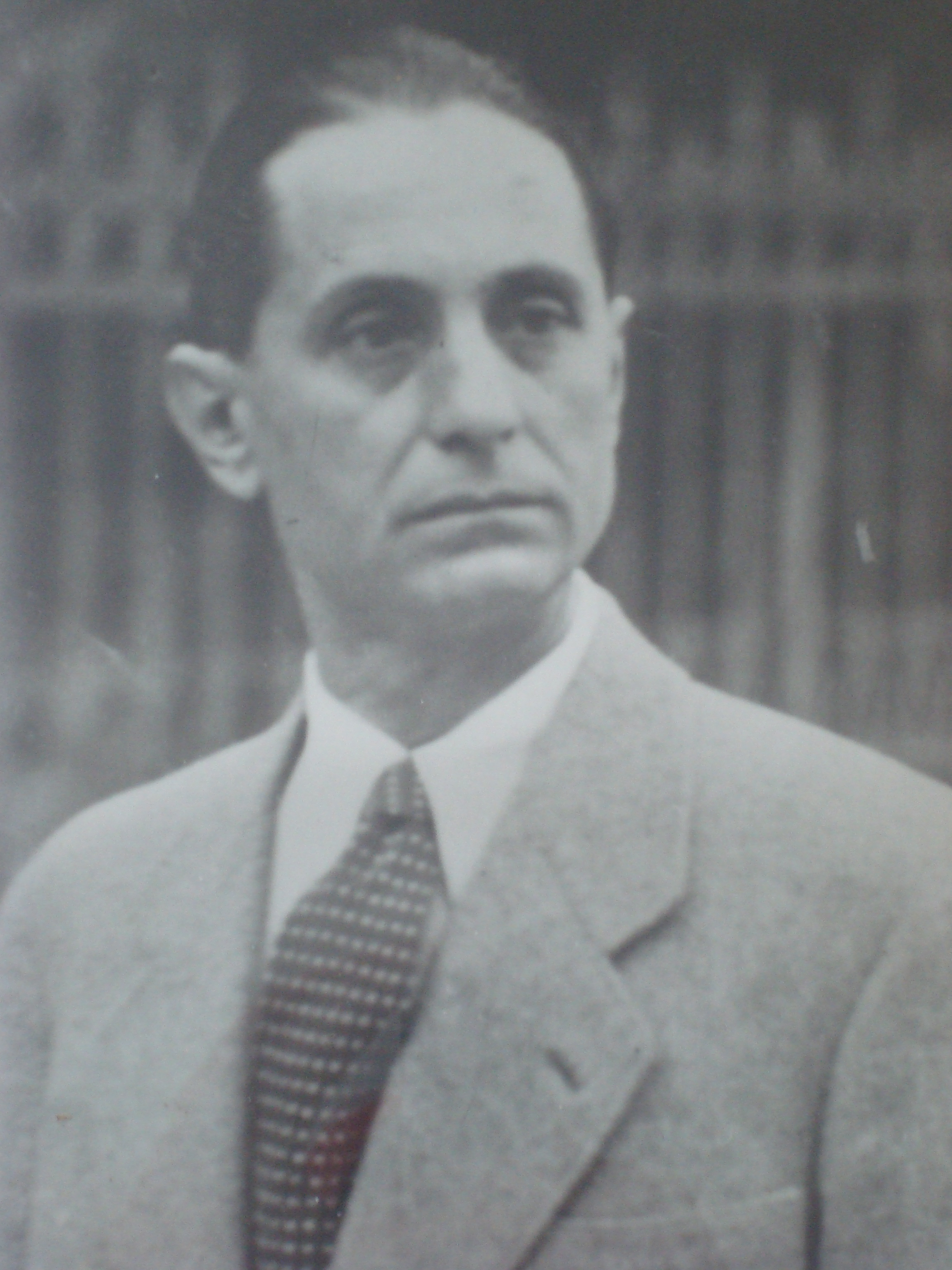
- George Fteris
- Born: 14 September 1891; Karea, East Mani, Greece
- Died: 14 September 1967 (aged 76)
- Occupations: Writer, foreign correspondent, translator, critic
- Writing career
- Pen name: George Fteris

George Fteris (Greek: Γιώργος Φτέρης), born George Tsimbidaros (Greek: Γιώργος Τσιμπιδάρος), (14 September 1891 - 14 September 1967) was a Greek journalist, foreign correspondent, critic, author, and poet.

== Family ==
Fteris had four siblings. Yiannis (nicknamed Yianko) remained in Mani. Vasilis fought in the Macedonian Struggle as a guerrilla captain and was killed in battle. Potis, like his brother George, was trained as a lawyer, wrote for many newspapers, and became the editor of one. He later became secretary to Eleftherios Venizelos and was elected a member of the Hellenic Parliament for Athens. In 1963, he became Minister to the Prime Minister's Office. They also had a sister named Olga, married with John Harames from Kremasti Lakonias. In 1931, George Fteris married Rhea Vrachinou, and on 13 July 1934, she gave birth to their only daughter Elyana.

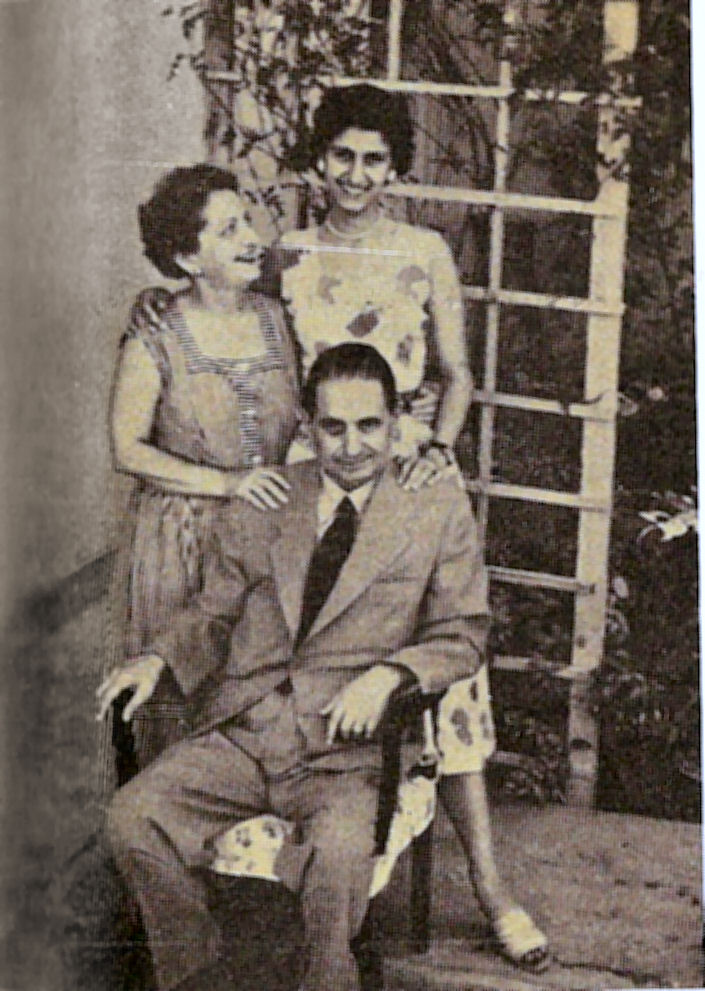
George Fteris (sitting) with his wife Rhea (left) and daughter Elyana

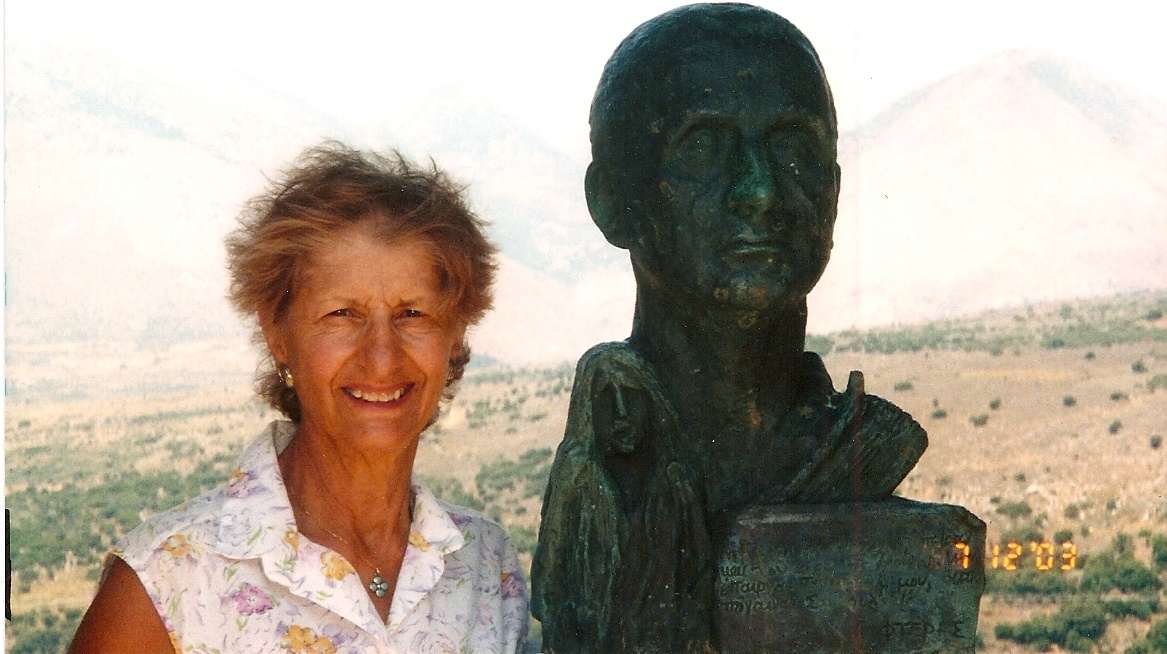
Fteris' daughter Elyana next to her father's bust

== Journalist ==
For much of his life, Fteris served as a foreign correspondent. Initially stationed in Rome, and later in France, he traveled Europe meeting famous people such as Italian dictator Benito Mussolini, whom Fteris interviewed many times. During his travels, he made many friends such as writer Nikos Kazantzakis, sculptor Michael Tombros, politician Eleftherios Venizelos, actress Ellie Lambeti, and even Pablo Picasso.

Upon his return to Greece, he became the editor for The Athenian News as well as a journalist for The Vima newspaper. Every Sunday, he would write their main article.

== Translator ==
In 1930, Fteris received a French Academy Award for his translation of Les Misérables from French into Greek. In 1966, he was awarded the Gold Medal of Journalism by King Constantine II. He was honored many other times by the Greek government for his work in literature and journalism.

== Author ==
Fteris wrote various books and articles. His daughter Elyana Damianos said, "…his books were deep and difficult to understand because he wanted to make better people. The books used plain language, but had deep meanings. He didn't want people reading garbage, but to search, to better one's self, ask questions, and also make people smarter. Basically, to make a man think."

== Horiata ==
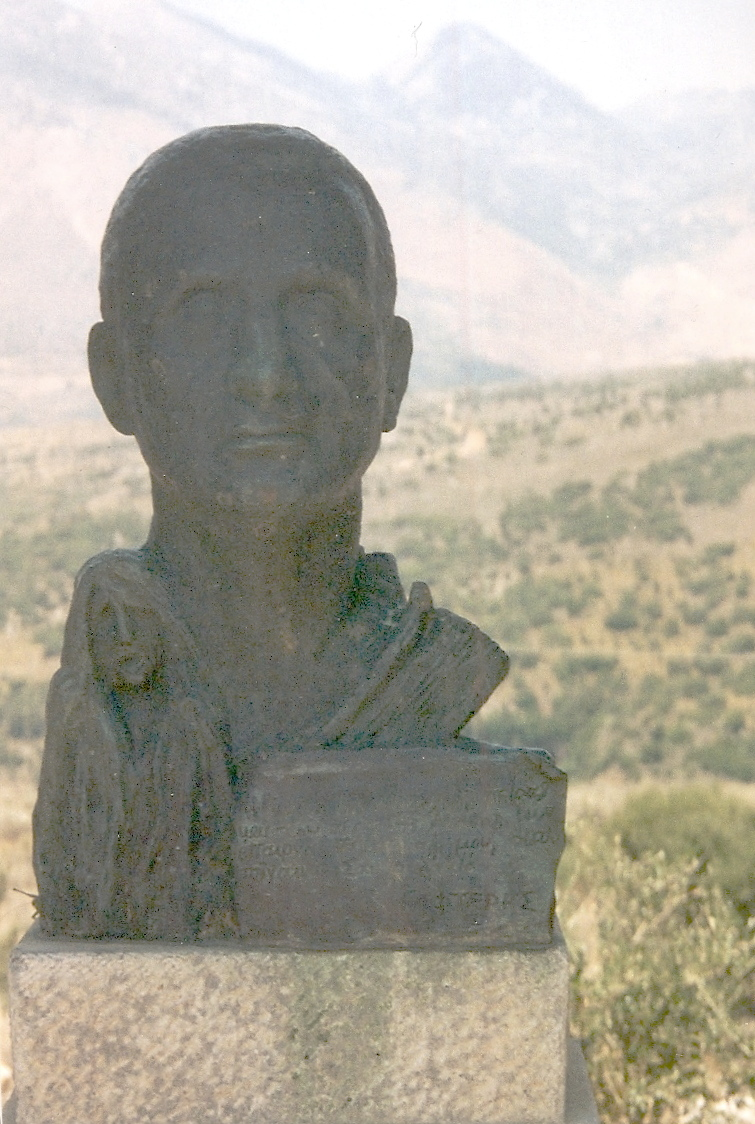
Bust of Fteris.

One of Fteris' greatest and most memorable accomplishments is a song called "Horiata" (Η Χωριάτα – "Village Woman"). In the winter of 1941–42, the first bitter winter of the German Occupation, he wrote an allegorical song and gave it to Sophia Vembo, most popular singer of the time and also family friend. She sang it in theaters all over Greece, each time wearing a dress with the national Greek colors on it. Even today, it is broadcast on national Greek radio stations. Commenting on the song over 35 years later one writer said, "It is a voice of hope and continuation. It resonated greatly in the hearts of the then enslaved people." In the song, Greece is represented as a village woman, and its youth as a budding tree.

During the time period, all patriotic songs were forbidden by the Nazis. Fteris knew this, and he wrote every verse of the song allegorically. His daughter said, "Each time it was sung, it electrified the audience. They heard the song and understood, so it gave them hope, and lifted them up emotionally. It scared the enemy, and it was like a threat."

Many people loved Fteris' song, and its message spread throughout Greece. Theaters would continually play it. But soon after, the Nazis seized control. The song was prohibited, and theaters were closed. A penalty was set for singing the song, and Nazis even came to Fteris' home threatening him with arrest. Vembo continued to perform "Horiata" in her concerts in the Middle East and continued to inspire the Greek resistance movement. Even though the song had been stifled in Greece, the damage had been done. The once tired and hopeless Greeks fought on throughout World War II as the song says, "with new branches and limbs."

Fteris died on his birthday in 1967 of liver cancer. Today his body lies in his homeland, Mani. On the road connecting the towns of Areopoli and Gytheio, a monument has been dedicated to him on the summit of a hill overlooking his favorite land. Though he left the limitations of village life behind as a teenager, he always kept Mani in his heart. He once wrote,

"The memory of Mani; the stone and the air of Mani; I have always taken with me wherever I went like a keepsake."

On his monument is a bust of his head sculpted by his friend Michael Tombros. On his shoulder, a woman representing Mani is weeping, mourning his death. His daughter Elyana said, "My father never wanted a monument because he was a very humble person, and he never believed in monuments; my mother insisted that he deserved one though."

== Quote ==
"When I die and you are asked who I was, what I believed, whence I was inspired to write what I did – answer them that I was nothing more than a simple person who believed deeply in love, in goodness, and in humanity. And I will continue to believe until my final moments that humanity can be saved only by believing in these."
