= Bey of Mani =

Local ruler of the Mani Peninsula in Ottoman Greece

The Bey of Mani (Greek: Μπέης της Μάνης) was the title given to the ruler of the Mani Peninsula in Peloponnese under the Ottoman Empire, from the late 17th through the early 19th centuries.

The term bey was a Turkish honorific title. The Ottomans would typically choose a local Maniot Greek from a leading clan as Bey of Mani. The bey was to govern Mani as a vassal state within Ottoman Greece, subject to the approval of the Sublime Porte.

The first Bey of Mani was the Maniot Limberakis Gerakaris, installed c. 1669. The last Bey of Mani was Petros Mavromichalis, also known as "Petrobey". Mavromichalis would become a significant figure in the Greek War of Independence which began in 1821.

In Greek, the title was often rendered as Hegemon or Prince of Mani (Ηγεμόνας της Μάνης).

== List of beys ==
The bey was always drawn from one of the local magnate clans:

Name	Birth	Death	Clan	Place of origin	Tenure
Tzanetos Koutoufaris			Koutoufaris family	Thalames	1776–1779
Michalbey Troupakis or Mourtzinos			Troupakis family	Kardamyli	1779–1782
Tzanetbey Grigorakis	1742	1813	Grigorakis family	Skoutari, Gytheion	1782–1798
Panagiotis Koumoundouros			Koumoundouros family	Doloi	1798–1803
Antonobey Grigorakis			Grigorakis family	Skoutari, Gytheion	1803–1808
Konstantis Zervakos or Zervobey			Zervakis family	Karvelas	1808–1810
Theodorobey Grigorakis			Grigorakis family	Marathonisi	1811–1815
Petrobey Mavromichalis	1765	1848	Mavromichalis family	Limeni, Oitylo	1815–1821
