= Sotiris Petroulas =

Greek activist (1943–1965)

Sotiris Petroulas (Greek: Σωτήρης Πέτρουλας), 1943 - 21 July 1965, was a Greek student that was killed on 21 July 1965 during demonstrations against the governments of "Iouliana".

Born in Oitylo, he was a founding member of the "Lambrakis Youth", named after Grigoris Lambrakis, who was murdered in 1963.

During one of the demonstrations of July 1965 in Athens, he was either hit by men of the Cities Police, or he was arrested and murdered. His funeral became another opportunity for new demonstrations, while Georgios Papandreou gave a speech.

A song was composed in his honour by Mikis Theodorakis. The students' union of Athens University of Economics and Business is named after him.
