= National Documentation Centre (Greece) =

Greek public organization

The National Documentation Centre (EKT; Greek: Εθνικό Κέντρο Τεκμηρίωσης) is a Greek public organization that promotes knowledge, research, innovation, and digital transformation. It was established in 1980 with funding from the United Nations Development Programme with the aim to strengthen the collection and distribution of research-related material, and to ensure full accessibility to it. It has been designated as a National Scientific Infrastructure, a National Authority of the Hellenic Statistical System, and National Contact Point for European Research and Innovation Programmes. Since August 2019, it has been established as a discrete public-interest legal entity under private law, and is supervised by the Ministry of Digital Governance (Article 59 / Law 4623/2019). The management bodies of EKT are the Administrative Board and the Director who, since 2013, has been Dr. Evi Sachini.

== Goals ==
National Documentation Centre

EKT's institutional role is the collection, organisation, documentation, digital preservation, and dissemination of scientific, research and cultural information, content and data produced in Greece. EKT's specific objectives, as stated on its official website, focus among others, on:

- Ensuring the dissemination of the country's scientific output.
- Meeting the needs of academia, policymakers and research and business communities for information and reliable data.
- Increasing the digital scientific and cultural content that is available in a user-friendly form and with legitimate rights of use for different target groups.
- Promoting open access to publications and data in the academic and research communities.
- Collaboration with academic libraries for the standardization in organizing and distributing metadata and digital scientific content.
- Collaboration and joint actions with libraries, archives, museums, scientific and cultural institutions which produce and manage content, focusing on the establishment of common interoperability standards and the availability of metadata and digital content.
- Providing specialized services to support the rapidly growing community of creative industries, start-ups and knowledge-intensive businesses.
- Promoting and supporting technology transfer, innovation management and participation in European research and business networks of the academic, research and business communities.

== General actions and areas of activity ==
EKT is active in many areas, strengthening the dissemination of existing and generated scientific and entrepreneurial knowledge with minimal restrictions ready to be reused in research, education, development, innovation, and society. Specifically, EKT collects, documents and makes reliable digital scientific and cultural content available, measures and monitors the Greek Research, Technology, Development, Innovation ecosystem, and supports businesses so that they can network, become outward-oriented and collaborate with the research community. It actively contributes actively in the national strategic planning Open Science and Open Access, while providing information on Open Access and Open Science issues through the openaccess.gr website. Since 1985, EKT has been legally appointed to establish, maintain and make available the National Archive of PhDTheses, which includes more than 44,000 doctoral dissertations (data: July 2020). EKT has cutting-edge technological infrastructure enabling high quality electronic services. In addition to its online services, EKT organizes and participates in workshops, conferences and exhibitions within Greece and abroad, while producing yearly publications, with a wide range of topics for Research, Innovation and Digital Content. Also, since 1996, it has been publishing the quarterly magazine 'Innovation, Research and Technology', presenting the most important developments in innovation, entrepreneurship, digital transformation, including EKT’s relevant actions, and search achievements and innovations of Greek researchers. EKT’s operations are funded by the Regular Budget, the Public Investment Programme, European and Co-financed Programmes and the provision of services.

EKT develops services in three areas of activity:

Digital content and services - eContent
In collaboration with reputable cultural and scientific organisations, EKT promotes the idea of a digital public space for culture and scientific knowledge produced in Greece. EKT has a comprehensive approach to organising and disseminating data about contemporary culture, cultural heritage and scientific output in the country. Central to its strategy is continuous data quality improvements, assuring interoperability of systems & data and openness. Through the aggregators SearchCulture.gr (reference 5) and OpenArchives.gr (reference 6) users have access to rich digital content and collections of authoritative organisations. Much of this activity involves best practice in documentation and semantic enrichment of metadata, in order to semantically link them and provide better search for queries made by different user communities. National content infrastructures, such as the National Archive of PhD Theses, the Social Sciences and Humanities Index, the National Hellenic Union Catalogue of Scientific Serials (ESKEP) (reference 7), and the bibliographic database BIBLIONET (reference 8), support researchers, scientists and society in general, in their search for reliable information. A number of public services, such as openABEKT (reference 9) and ePublishing (reference 10), have been developed to meet the specialised needs of organisations, publishers and information scientists. EKT's Digital Library of Science, Technology and Culture (reference 11) provides access to collections of international and Greek content, such as scientific journals books, databases, doctoral dissertations, and offers users personalised information services. Further information at: https://econtent.ekt.gr/

Indicators and statistics for research, technology, development and innovation - metricsEKT
EKT is at the forefront of statistical production and policy monitoring, making it the largest data provider on developments in the areas of research, innovation and entrepreneurship in Greece. Under its capacity as a National Authority of the Hellenic Statistical System, EKT collaborates with ELSTAT, Eurostat and OECD and produces the official statistics and indicators for Research, Technology, Development and Innovation (RDI). Also EKT produces and publishes a range of statistics and indicators on Greek scientific publications in international journals, on holders of doctoral degrees, on women in Research & Development and on research performance in European programmes. In addition, it conducts studies and issues publications that contribute to the mapping and understanding of the national research and innovation system. Finally, it collects data, produces indicators and research on young researchers, highlighting their results. EKT is an outward oriented organisation and actively participates in the international statistical community, taking part in scientific conferences and international committees, thus enriching the domestic public discourse with new aspects necessary for understanding innovation activities. Further information at: https://metrics.ekt.gr/

Services for networking, partnerships, growth - innovationEKT'
EKT plays a key role in informing the research and academic communities, in supporting businesses to effectively utilise European and public policies and financial instruments. Amongst its priorities are the connection between research and entrepreneurship, and the empowerment of top young researchers and entrepreneurs. With extensive experience as a National Contact Point for 11 areas in the European Horizon 2020 Research and Innovation Programme, and as the co-ordinator of Enterprise Europe Network-Hellas, EKT advises researchers and businesses in order to secure funding, seek international co-operation, and strengthen their outward-orientation and potential. EKT as the EIT Health HUB co-ordinator for Greece acts as an accelerator for digital health and medtech startups and supports students in the KTI framework. EKT provides research teams and companies with valid and timely information on funding opportunities and provides advisory guidance for participation in research projects and collaboration for research, technology, and business. It also helps to leverage research results by connecting businesses and research bodies. Finally, it seeks to create a virtual community of Greeks around the world, connecting them to the country, through the 'Knowledge and Partnership Bridges' initiative.
