= East Mani =

Municipality in Laconia, Greece

East Mani Ανατολική Μάνη
- Municipality
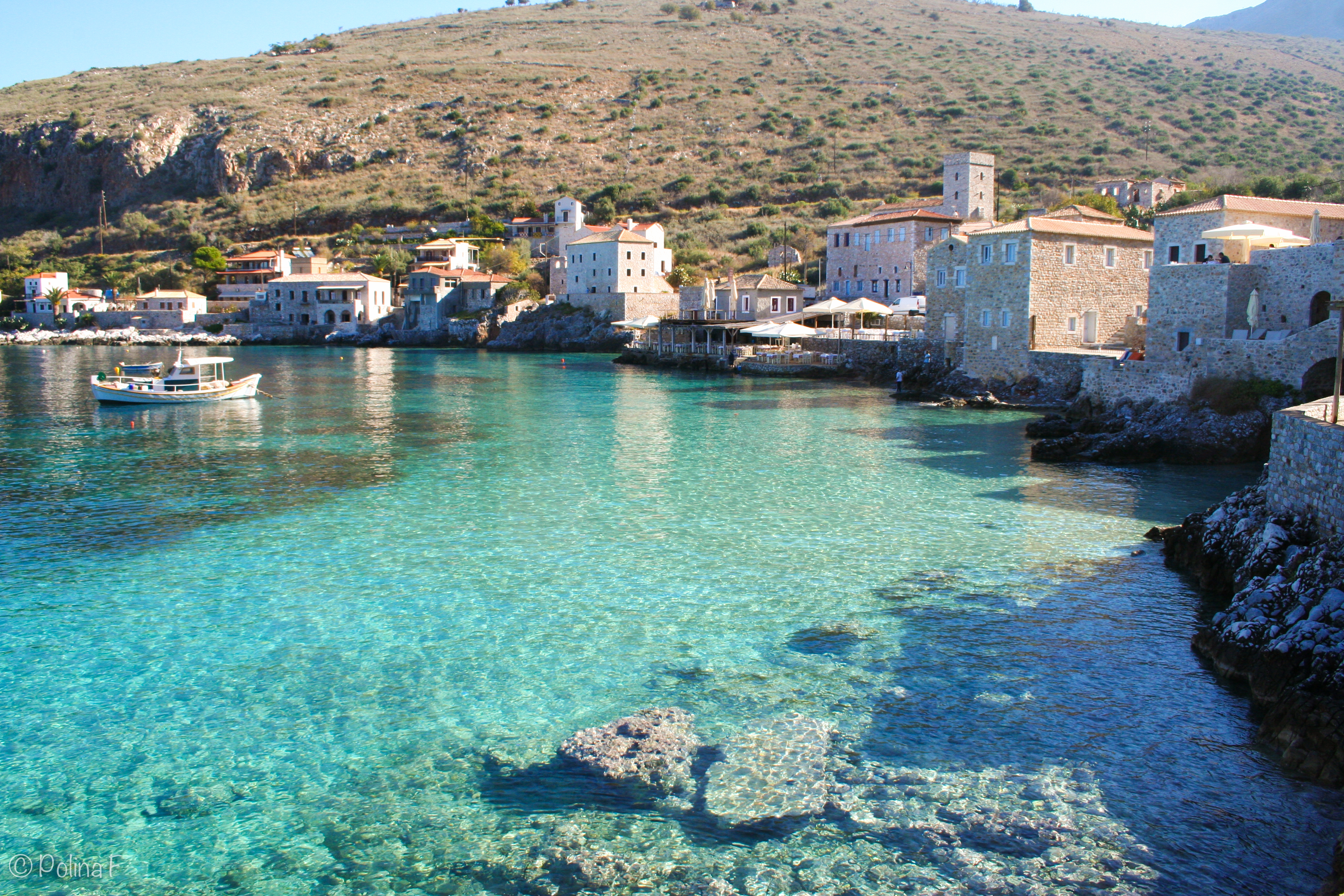
- Areopoli shoreline.

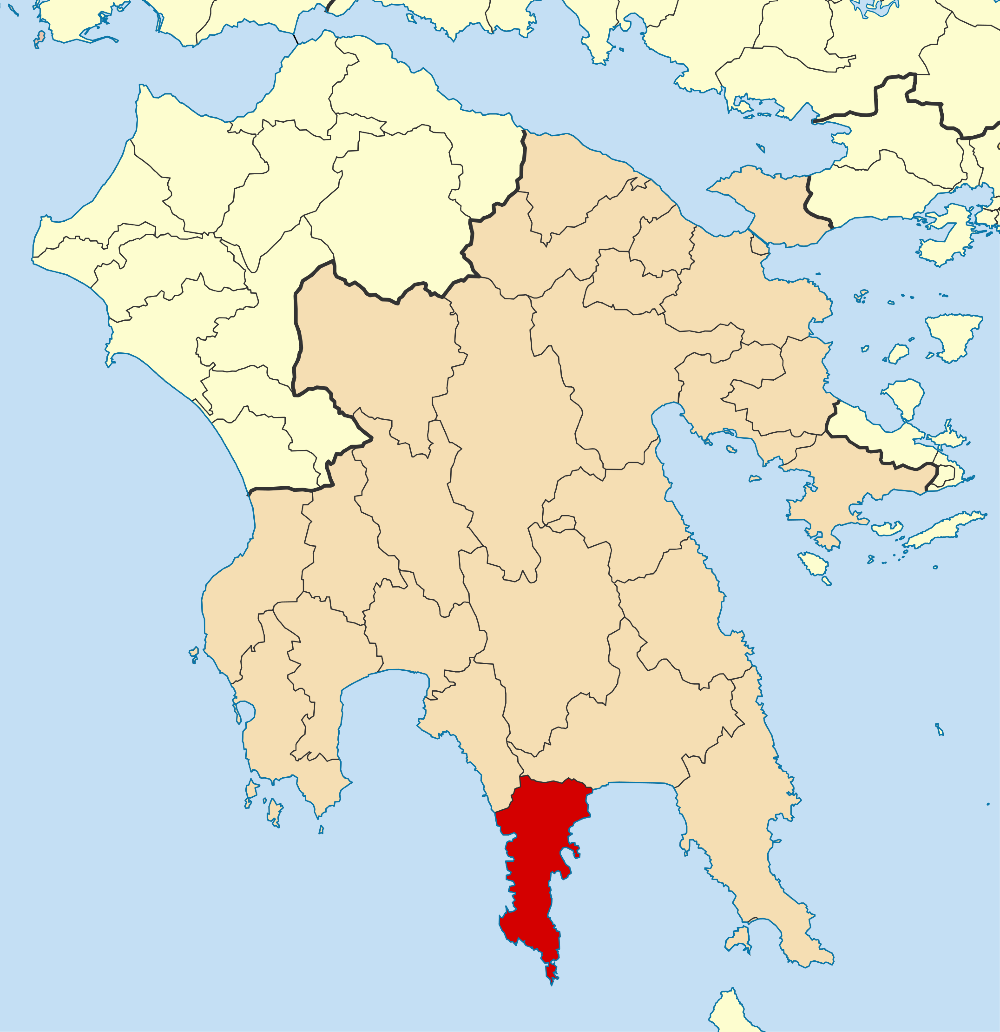

- Location within Greece
- Coordinates: 36°37′N 22°30′E
- Country: Greece
- Administrative region: Peloponnese
- Regional unit: Laconia
- Seat: Gytheio

Area
  - Municipality: 619.3 km^{2} (239.1 sq mi)
  - Municipal unit: 108.9 km^{2} (42.0 sq mi)
- Elevation: 91 m (299 ft)

Population (2021)
  - Municipality: 12,779
  - Density: 20.63/km^{2} (53.44/sq mi)
  - Municipal unit: 1,010
  - Municipal unit density: 9.27/km^{2} (24.0/sq mi)
- Time zone: UTC+2 (EET)
  - Summer (DST): UTC+3 (EEST)
- Postal code: 230 66
- Area code: 27330
- Vehicle registration: ΑΚ

East Mani (Greek: Ανατολική Μάνη - Anatolikí Máni) is a Greek municipality in the Peloponnese administrative region, in the regional unit of modern Laconia. Its seat of administration is the town of Gytheio. It covers the southern portion of the mountainous and rocky Mani Peninsula, a geographic and cultural region long considered distinct and isolated relative to the rest of Greece. The neighboring municipality West Mani to its northwest encompasses the remainder of the Mani Peninsula. Both municipalities were established in 2011 following reforms to Greek administrative divisions.

== Geography ==
East Mani occupies the southeastern part of the Mani Peninsula, a region known as Laconian Mani (Λακωνική Μάνη) or Inner Mani (Μέσα Μάνη). The municipality of West Mani is to its north.

East Mani is bisected by the Taygetus Mountains; locals call its western half Aposkiaderi (shady) and the eastern side Prodiliaki (sunny).

The 2021 Greece wildfires ravaged much of the Peloponnese. East Mani took damage across 105 sq. km., with 35% of its mountain slope burnt in the wildfire .

== History ==
The municipality of East Mani was established in 2011 by the Kallikratis Programme, a nationwide administrative reform. As a consequence of the reform, the municipalities of Gytheio, Oitylo, and Sminos were merged into East Mani.

== Economy ==
The Mani Peninsula's natural features and history make East Mani a tourist destination. Cliffs, blue waters, Mavrovouni and Skoutari beaches, the lighthouse on Cranaus, and the Diros caves are some of its attractions. In the summer, festivals sponsored by local churches and cultural organizations are also popular.

== Area ==
The municipality has an area of 619.277 km^{2}, the municipal unit 108.879 km^{2}.

== Population ==
The population development of the municipal unit and the larger municipality East Mani are listed below.

Year	Municipal unit	Municipality
1991	2,024	-
2001	2,111	-
2011	1,192	13,005
2021	1,010	12,779

== See also ==
- List of settlements in Laconia
