= Vergadeika =

Village in Laconia, Greece

Vergadeika Βεργαδέικα
- Settlement
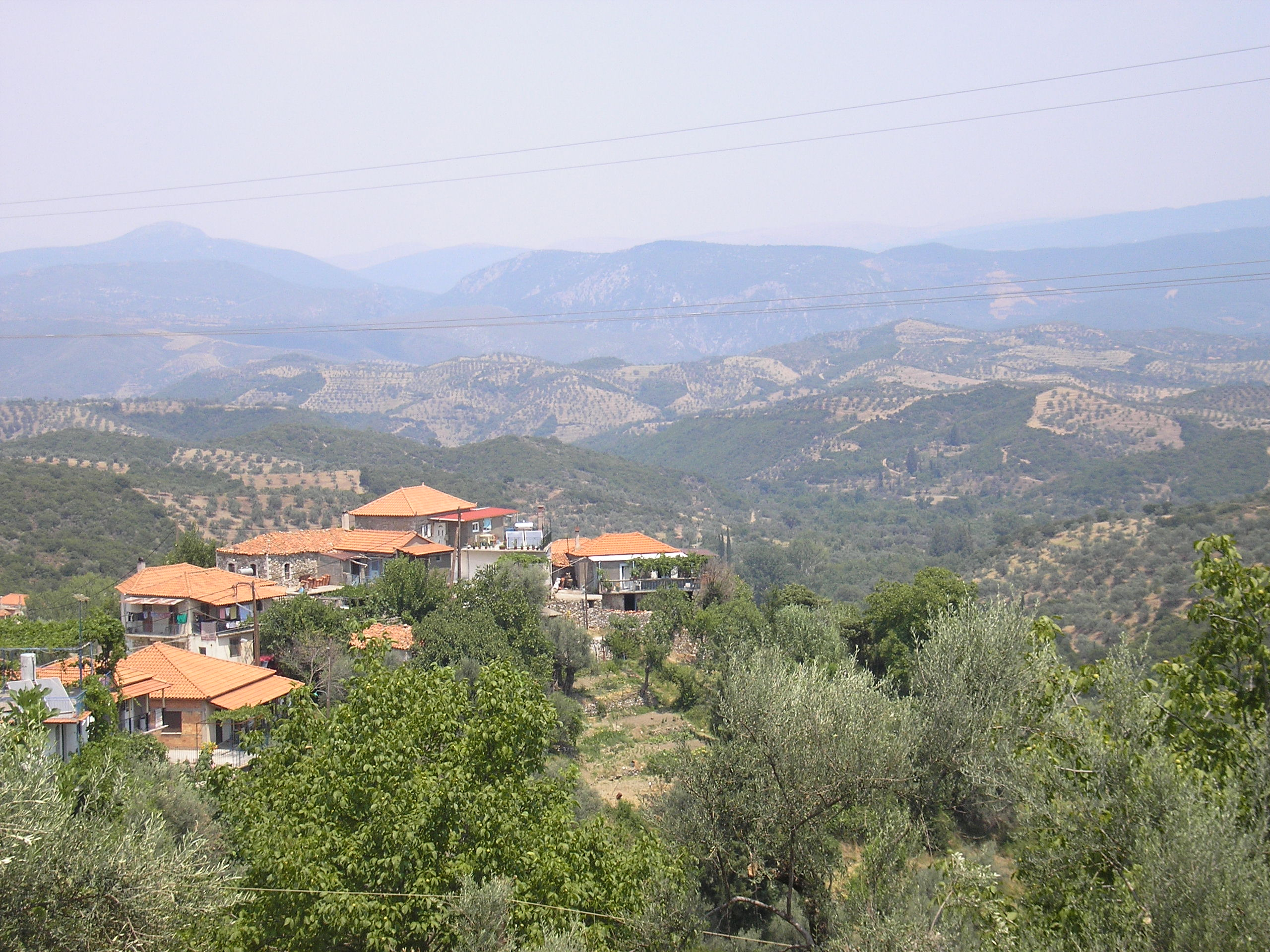
- South Vergadeika and the Evrotas Valley

- Location within Greece
- Coordinates: 37°13.4′N 22°15.6′E
- Country: Greece
- Administrative region: Peloponnese
- Regional unit: Laconia
- Municipality: Sparti
- Municipal unit: Pellana
- Community: Longanikos
- Elevation: 557 m (1,827 ft)

Population (2021)
  - Total: 39
- Time zone: UTC+2 (EET)
  - Summer (DST): UTC+3 (EEST)
- Vehicle registration: ΑΚ

Vergadeika (Greek: Βεργαδέικα) is a small village within the larger Longanikos community in Laconia, southern Greece. Vergadeika is a one- to two-hour drive to the cities Sparta (34 km), Tripoli (49 km), and Kalamata (58 km). It is approximately 202 km from Athens.

Vergadeika lies less than a kilometer away from the large settlement of Longanikos, which has a current population of approximately 300 people. Due to the larger size of Longanikos, Vergadeika is considered to be "within" Longanikos for purposes of classification and official administration.

The village has an approximate population of 80 people and consists of a "north part" and a "south part". This village, as well its neighboring villages, had a much higher population several decades ago, but migration to the major Greek cities, such as Athens, and abroad, namely to the United States, diminished the population tremendously. Presently, there are mostly elderly Greeks who reside in the village, while their children return from the large metropolitan areas for weekend vacations or major holidays.

Coming from Athens by car, one would take highway E94 to E65. From E65 in Tripoli the village is only accessible by small mountain roads. A visitor may also travel by bus or train to the nearest large city, Tripoli, and take an automobile from there.

== Geography ==
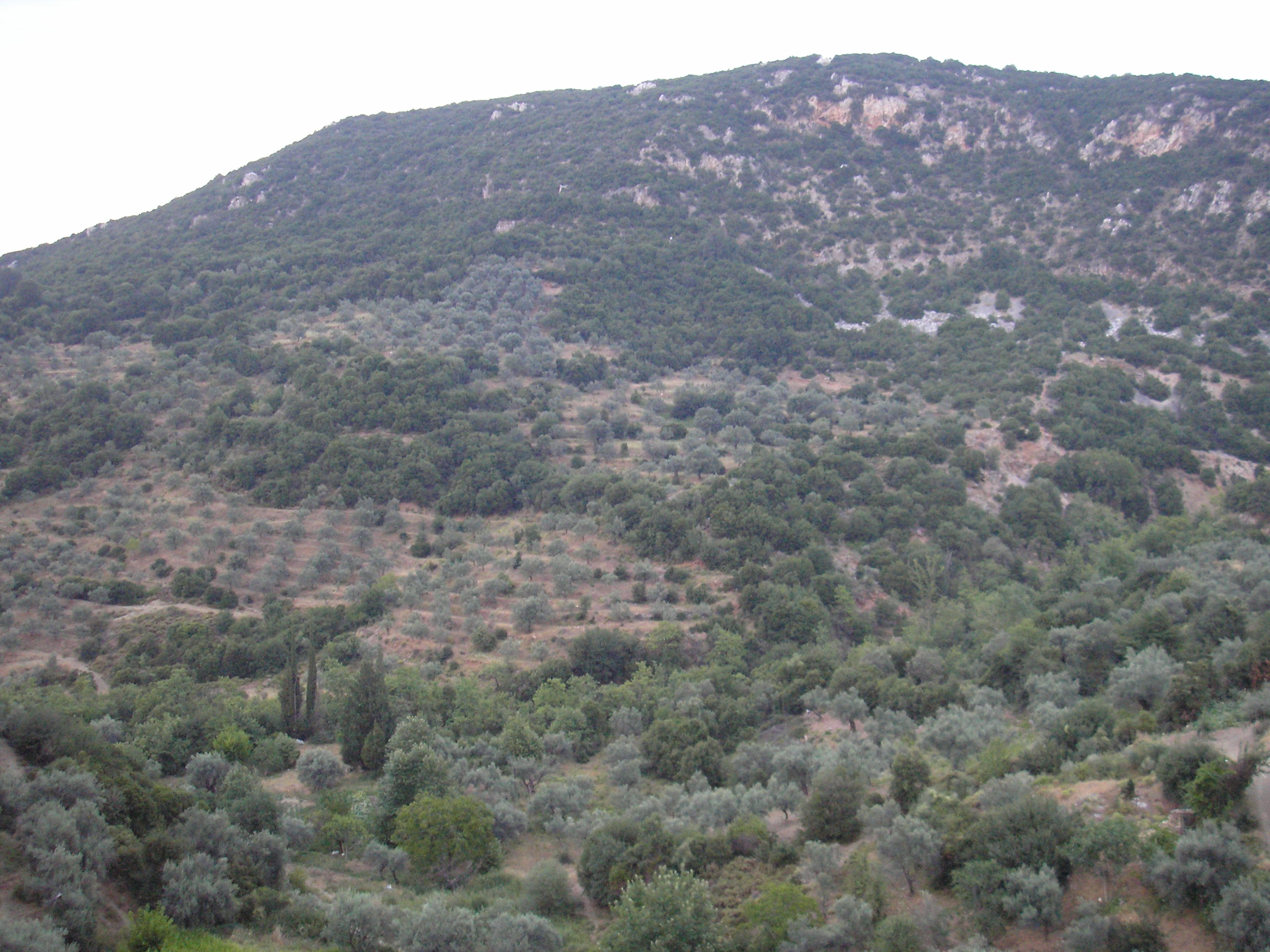
Olive trees on the mountain

Vergadeika is settled on the side of the Taygetos mountain range, a historically famous and geographically prominent feature in the Peloponnese. Below Vergadeika is the fertile Evrotas Valley (named after the ancient Evrotas river), which is formed by the convergence of the Taygetos and Parnonas mountains. Historically, this strategic flat plain was used for the transportation of people and ancient Spartan armies. Agriculturally, olives are cultivated in this fertile valley. Many of the residents of the village also make homemade wine, although this is strictly for local consumption.

== Life of the village ==
Due to the high population of elderly Greeks living in Vergadeika, many of the residents spend their time in their homes or in their gardens. The younger population of the village works during the day, typically in the close cities of Tripoli, Sparta and Megalopoli.

It is not uncommon to find people in Vergadeika having coffee and cigarettes for many hours.

During the day, a local grocery truck drives to the villages of the Longanikos settlement and sells goods to the villagers. This service is specifically performed for the elderly villagers who do not have the means to travel far for groceries.

=== Education and other services ===
There are many schools serving the municipality. There are two Kindergartens in Longanikos and Pellana, five primary schools in Pellana, Kastori, Agoriani, Georgitsi, and Longanikos, and one junior school and one highschool in Kastori.

The nearest clinics to Vergadeika are located in Longanikos, Georgitsi, and Kastori. The nearest post offices are located in Georgitsi and Kastori, and the Mayor's office is located in Pellana.

== Ruins in the area ==
Because the village is an ancient village in the Peloponnese, one of the oldest regions of the Greece, it lies very close to many important ruins. In the actual village of Vergadeika stands the church of Agios Demetrios. This church dates from the 15th century.

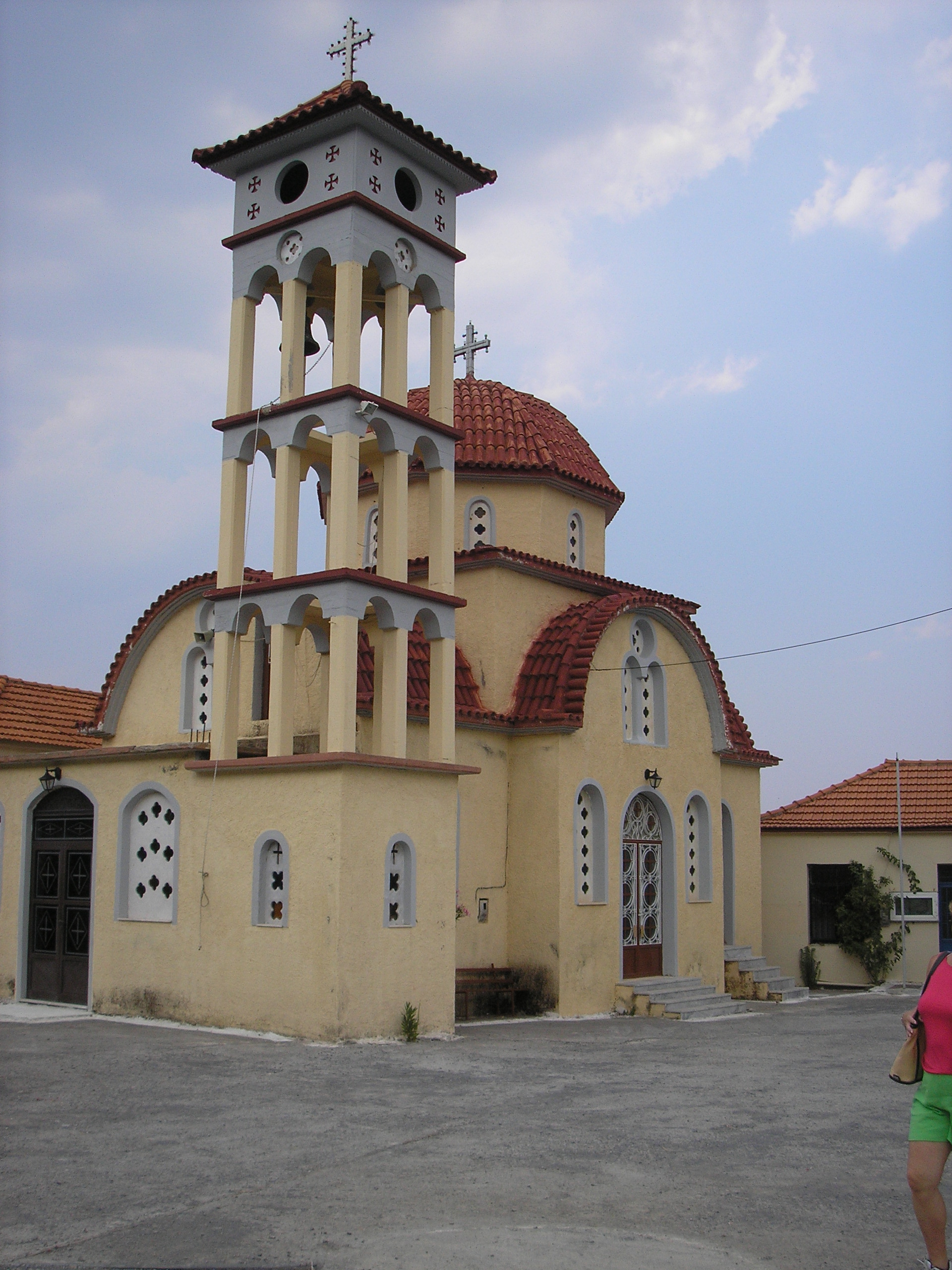
The church of Agios Demetrios in Vergadeika

The closest ruins to the village are in the larger towns of Longanikos and Kastoria. In Longanikos, a visitor can find sites such as: the church of Agios Georgios (1375 A.D.), the church of the Holy Apostles of Agioi Theodoroi (1380 A.D.), the church of the Assumption of the Virgin Mary (15th century), the Fountain at Vergdeika, the mansion of "Papakalos" (end of the 18th century), and the church of the Prophet Elias (built in 1810) which is decorated with artifacts from the 10th to 11th centuries. Many of the surrounding villages have ancient, medieval, and early modern attractions as well, such as Kastoria, Agoriani, and Vordonia. In the latter the remains of a medieval Frankish Fort can be found.

The close village of Pellana, which is the namesake for the municipality, holds the ruins of an ancient town from the days of Sparta.

Vergadeika is very close to the famous sites of Mystras and ancient Sparta. It is also within 30 km of sites such as Mantineia, the Temple of Apollo Epicurius at Bassae, and the ancient site at Megalopoli.

== Greek fires of 2007 ==
In August 2007, devastating forest fires ripped through southern Greece, killing 64 souls. Vergadeika and surrounding villages were threatened and many residents, specifically elderly ones, were evacuated. Some of the villagers, however, refused to leave and helped battle nearby smaller fires that had broken out.

== Miscellaneous ==
- The professional baseball player for the Boston Red Sox, Harry Agganis, is a Greek-American whose parents hail from the village of Longanikos. He is a local Greek-American hero in Boston, Massachusetts.
- The Loganikos Society, a Greek-American organization, was founded in Massachusetts.
- The villages of Longanikos, Vergadeika, Agoriani, Pardali, and many others in the municipality, are believed to be derived from the Slavic and Turkish languages. For instance, Pardali is believed to come from a Turk named Pardali who owned the entire area. Also, a large family in the village of Vergadeika, whose surname is Arvanitis, reinforces this hypothesis. The name Arvanitis is believed to be derived from a migratory Albanian-Greek tribe, the Arvanites, from northern Greece.

== Pictures of the village ==
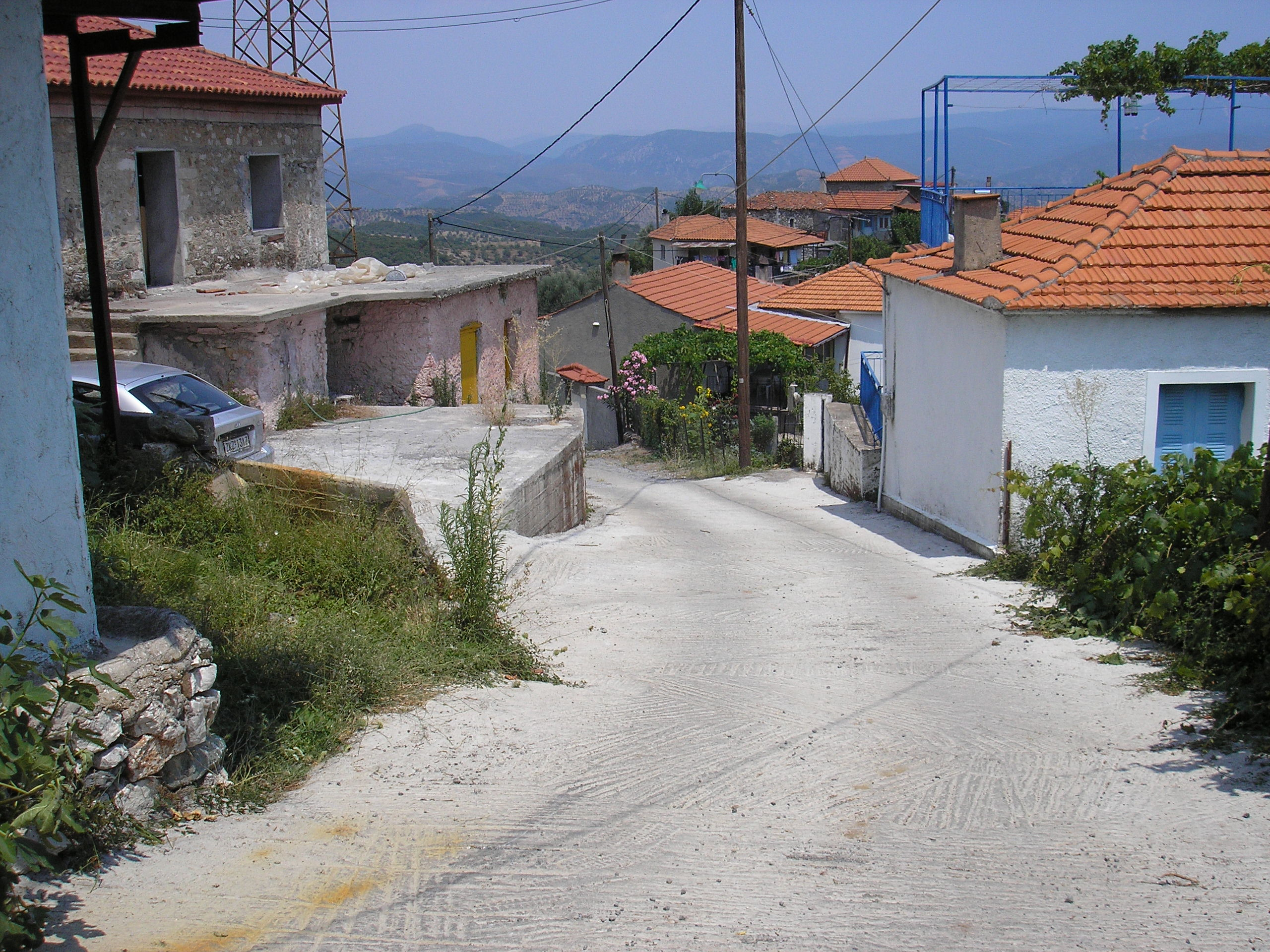
A road in the southern part of Vergadeika.

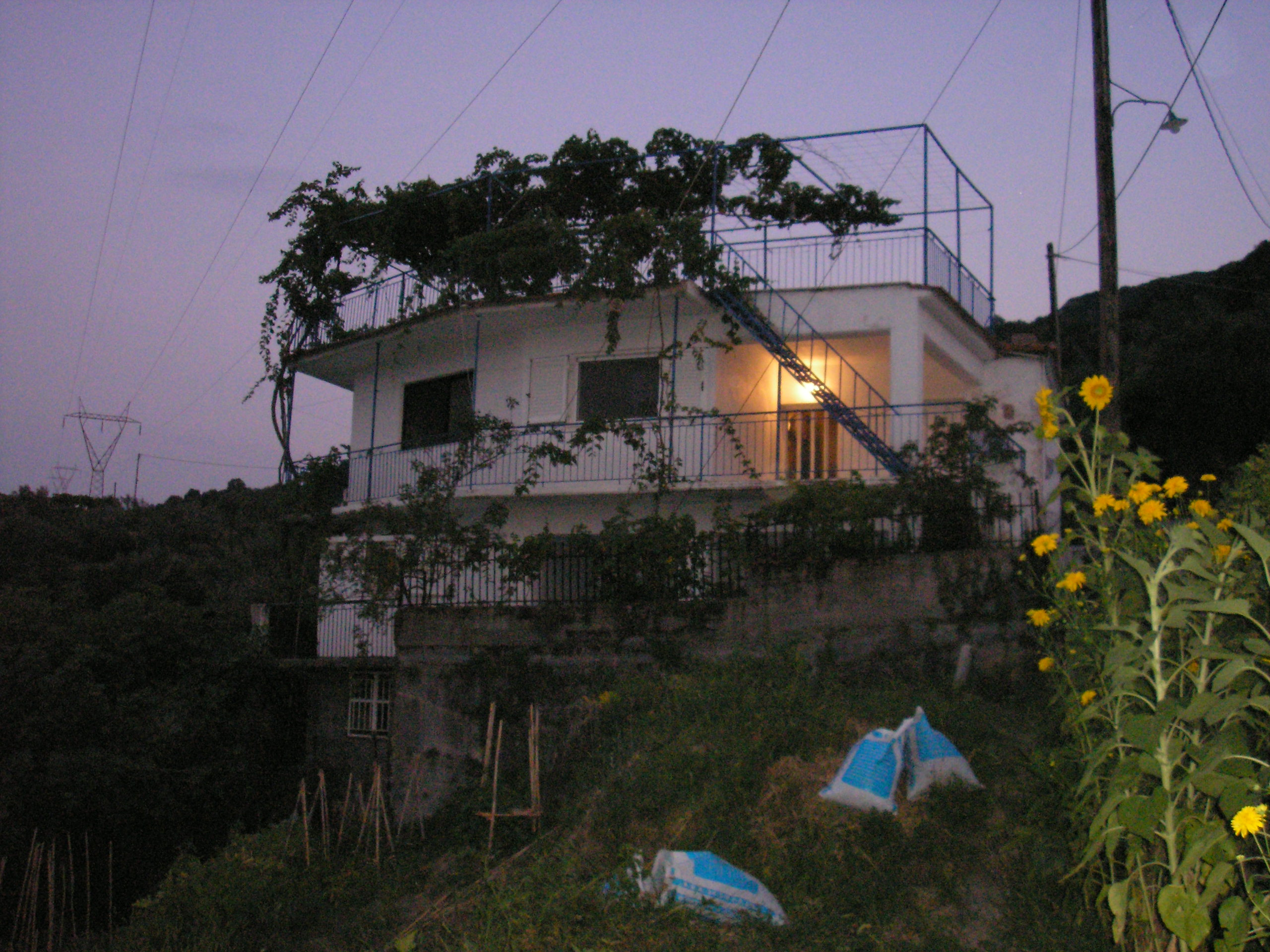
The home of Elias Arvanitis in Vergadeika.

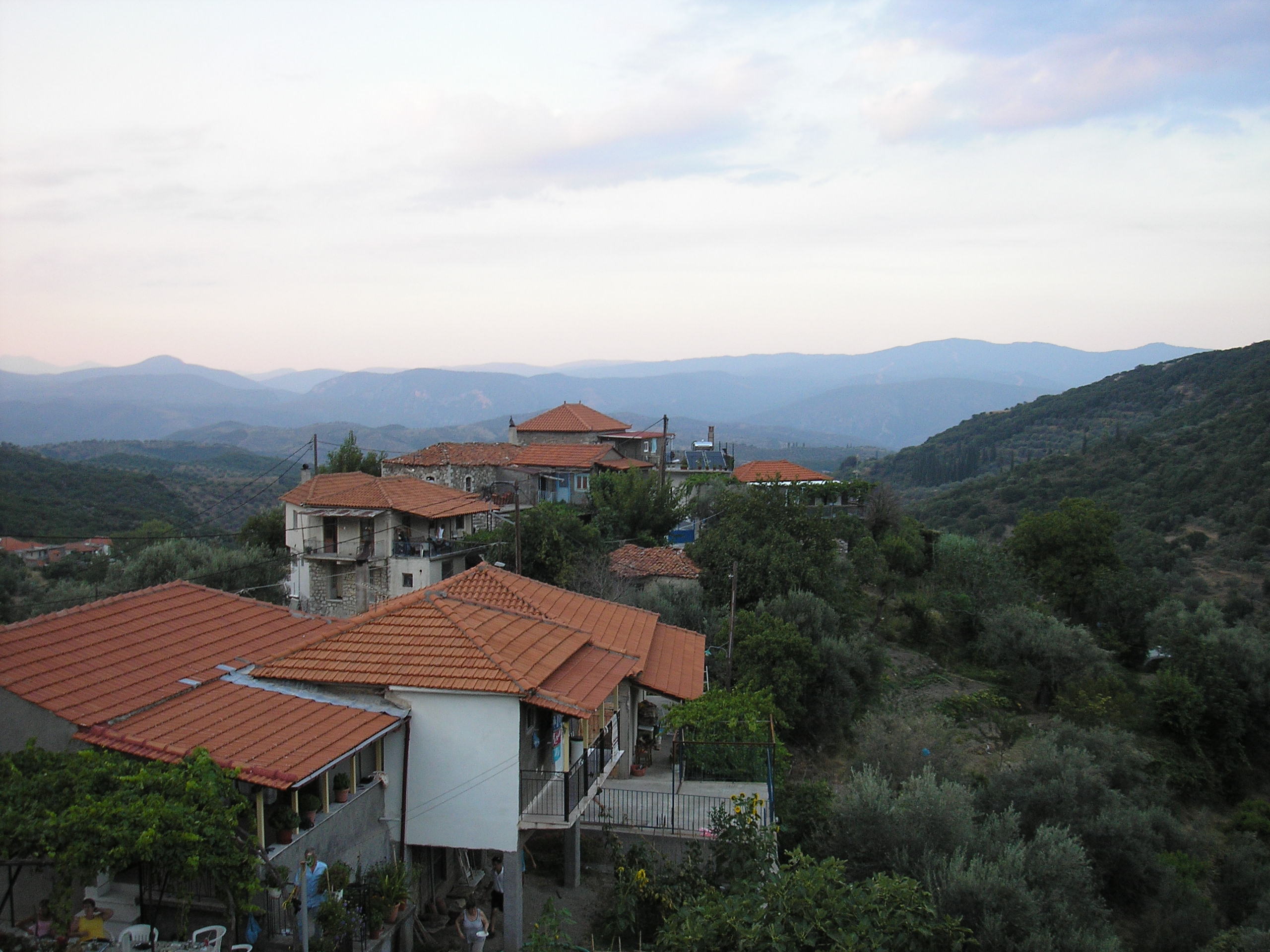
The southern part of the village by day.

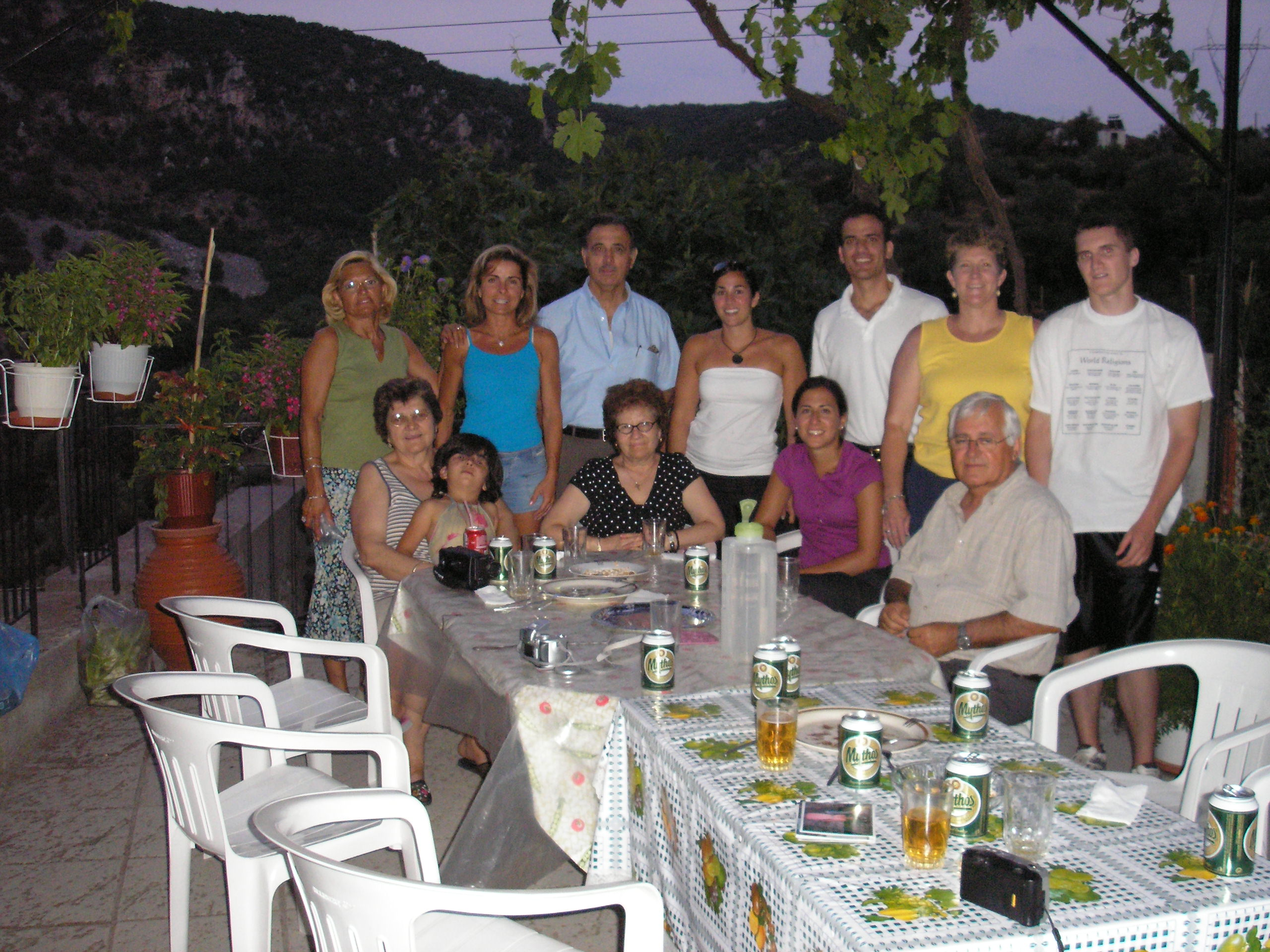
A Greek family in Vergadeika.

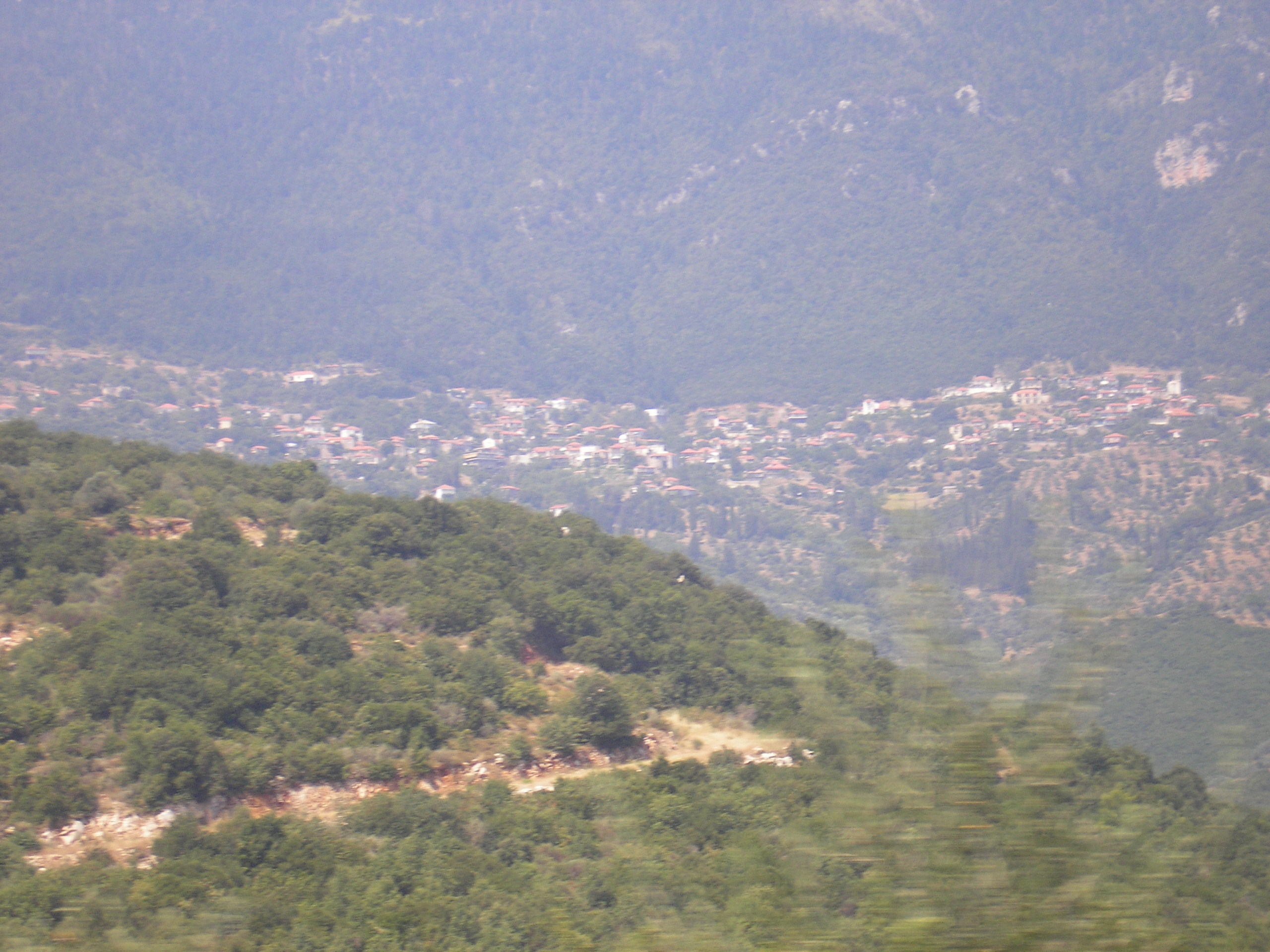
Vergadeika overlooking Longanikos.

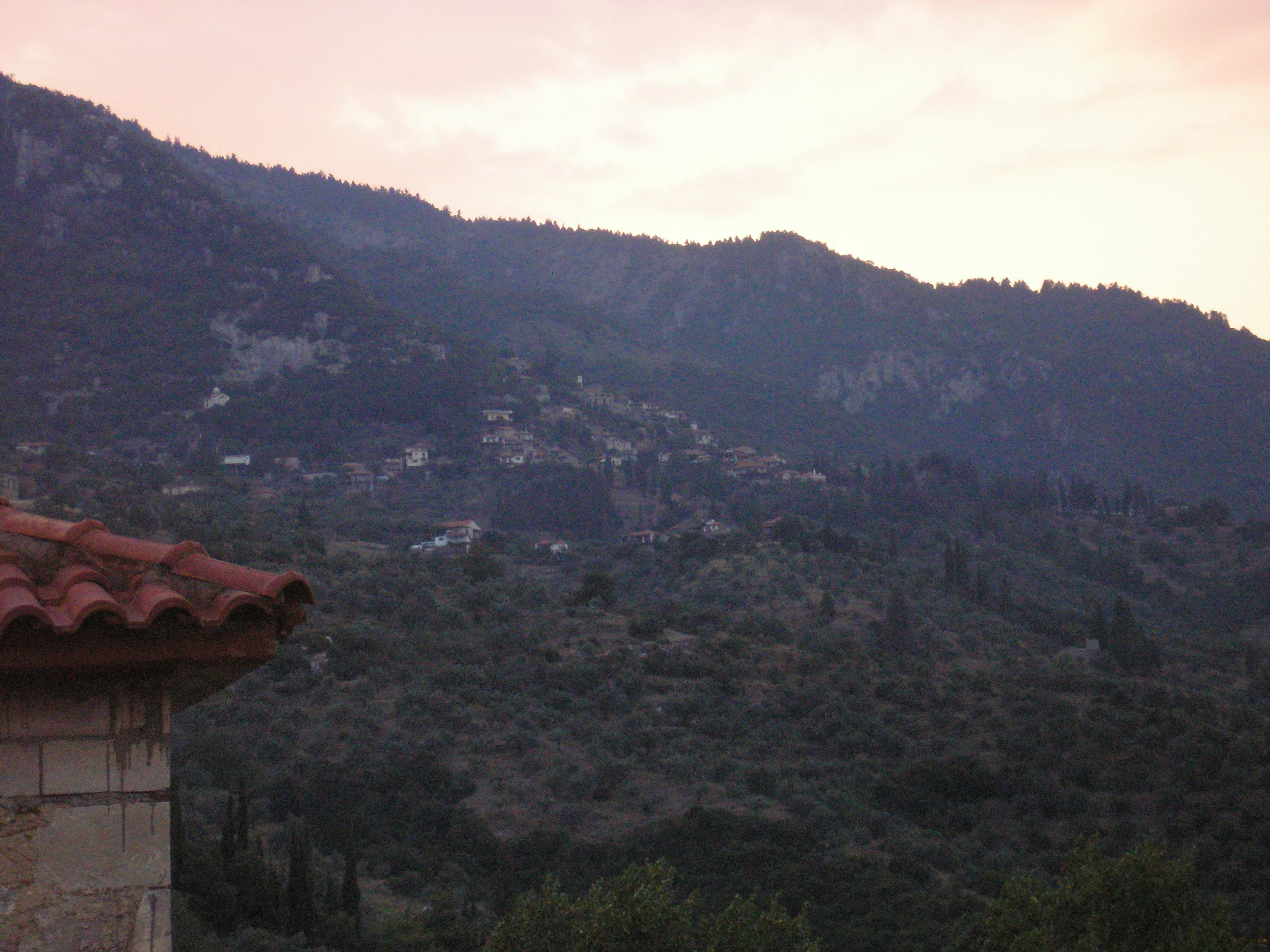
Vergadeika below Mount Taigetos range.

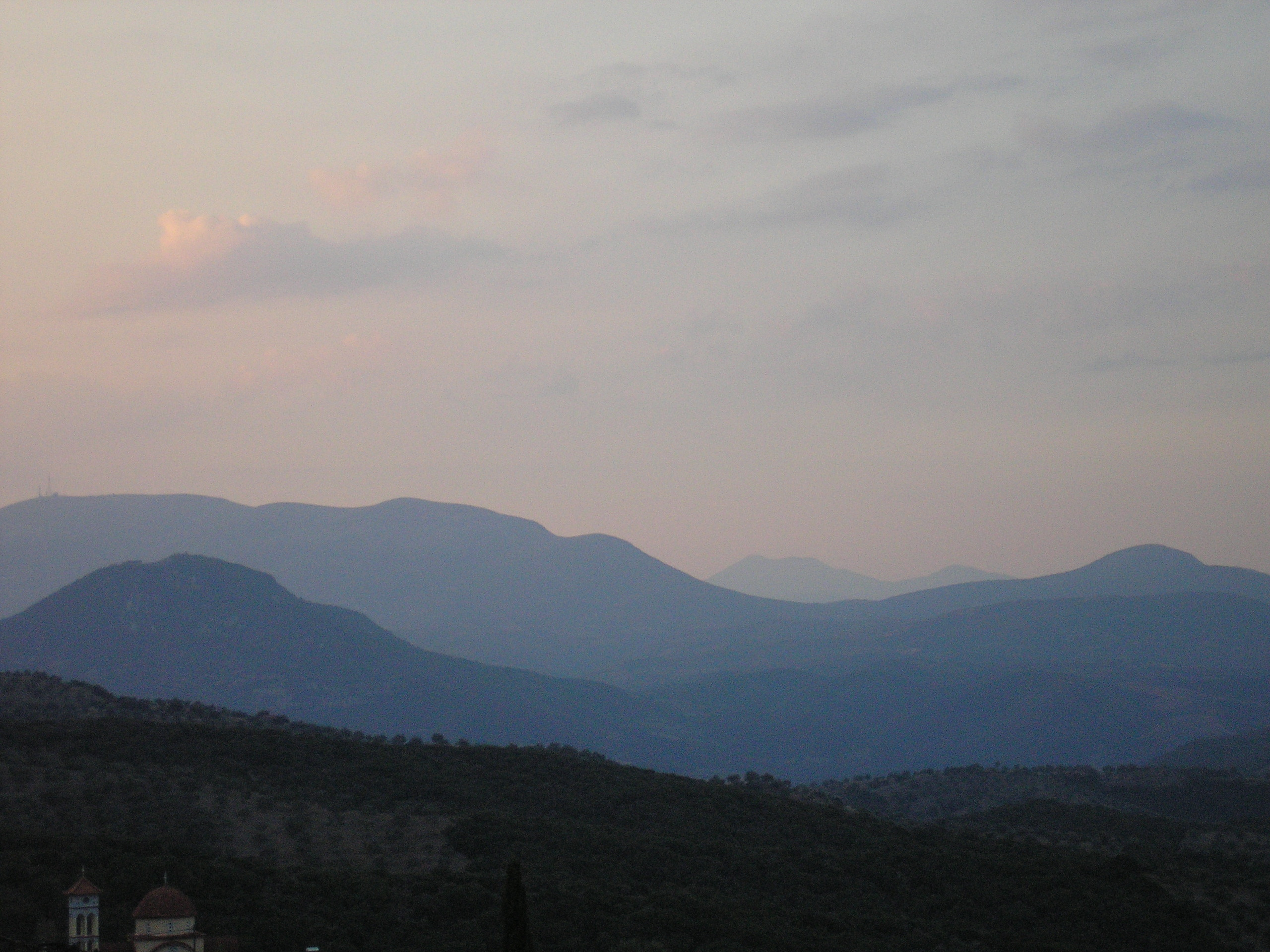
View of Taigetos range from Vergadeika.

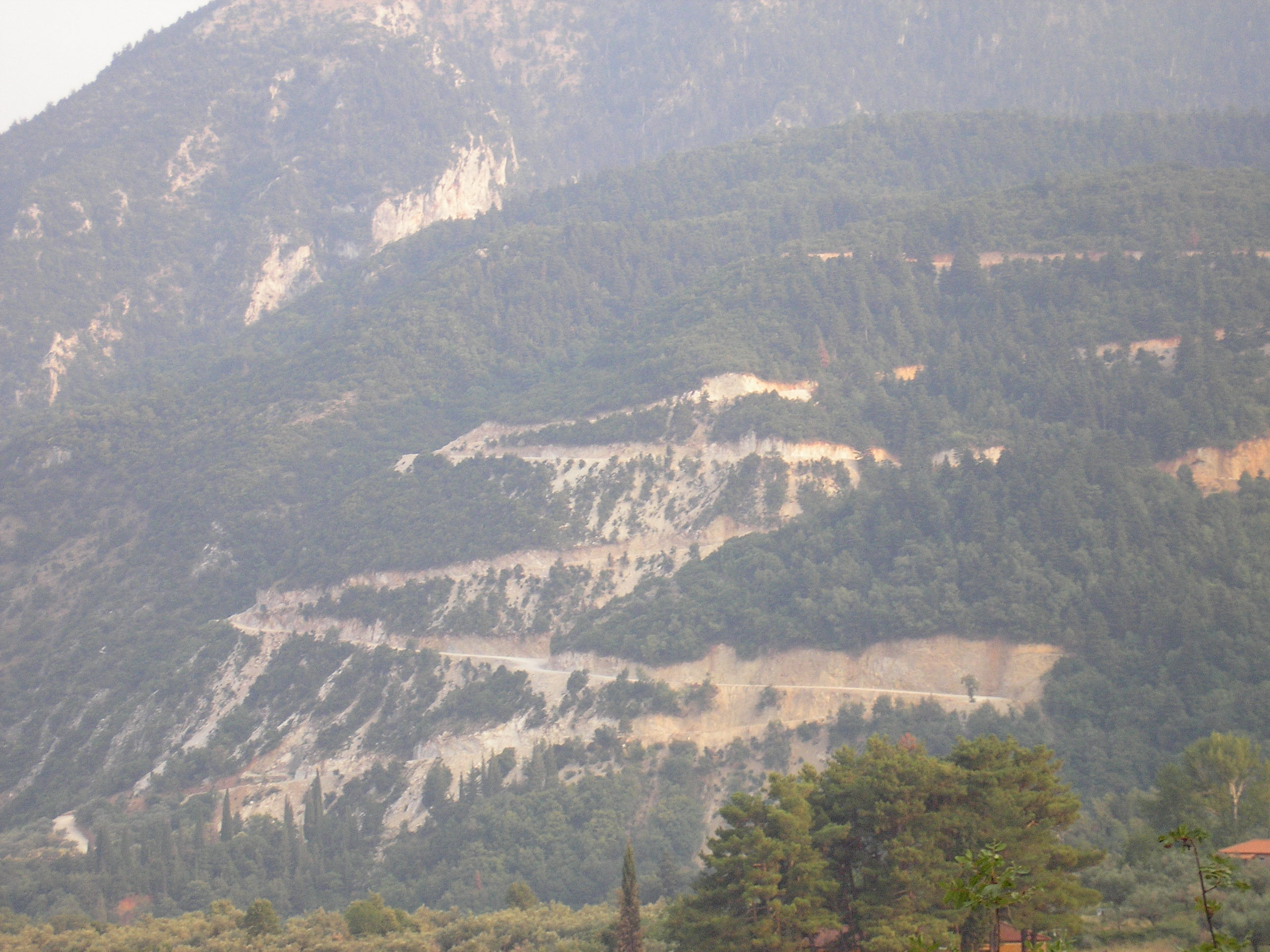
Mountain road near Vergadeika.
