= Longanikos =

Village in Laconia, Greece

Longanikos Λογκανίκος
- Community
- Location within Greece
- Coordinates: 37°14′N 22°14.9′E
- Country: Greece
- Administrative region: Peloponnese
- Regional unit: Laconia
- Municipality: Sparti
- Municipal unit: Pellana
- Elevation: 770 m (2,530 ft)

Population (2021)
  - Community: 404
- Time zone: UTC+2 (EET)
  - Summer (DST): UTC+3 (EEST)
- Postal code: 23065
- Area code: 27310
- Vehicle registration: ΑΚ

Longanikos (Greek: Λογκανίκος, Logkaníkos), also known as Longanico, Longanicos, Logganiko, and Logganikos, is a village located in Laconia, Greece, in the ancient and historical Peloponnese area of southern Greece. It is about 30 kilometers (19 mi) north of Sparta, the capital city of Laconia, and is also very close to the cities of Kalamata, Tripolis, and Megalopolis. It rests on the eastern slope of Mount Taigetos. The population of Longanikos was 404 during the 2021 Greek Census. This figure includes the population of the surrounding smaller villages Vergadeika, Kyparrissi, Giakoumaiika, and Kotitsa. Because of the small size of this village, residents of this town often identify themselves as Spartans to other Greeks or foreigners. For those who are familiar with this area, a resident or person from Longanikos is referred to in Greek as a Logkanikiótes (Λογκανικιώτης) if male or a Logkanikiótissa (Λογκανικιώτισσα) if female.

== Administration ==
The village is administered as part of the Pellana region of the Laconia Prefecture. The Pellana region's administrative central office is located in the village of Kastania (aka "Kastorion", "Kastori") which is about 24 kilometers (15 mi) south of Longanikos. (Note: Diaspora Greeks looking for documents related to any legal, property, or citizenship issues for themselves or their family should look here first for information and guidance. However, in 2011 some of the administrative functions, formerly processed in the Kastori prefectural office, were migrated to municipal offices in Sparta. One should inquire as to the exact location for the services you are trying to obtain.)

== History ==
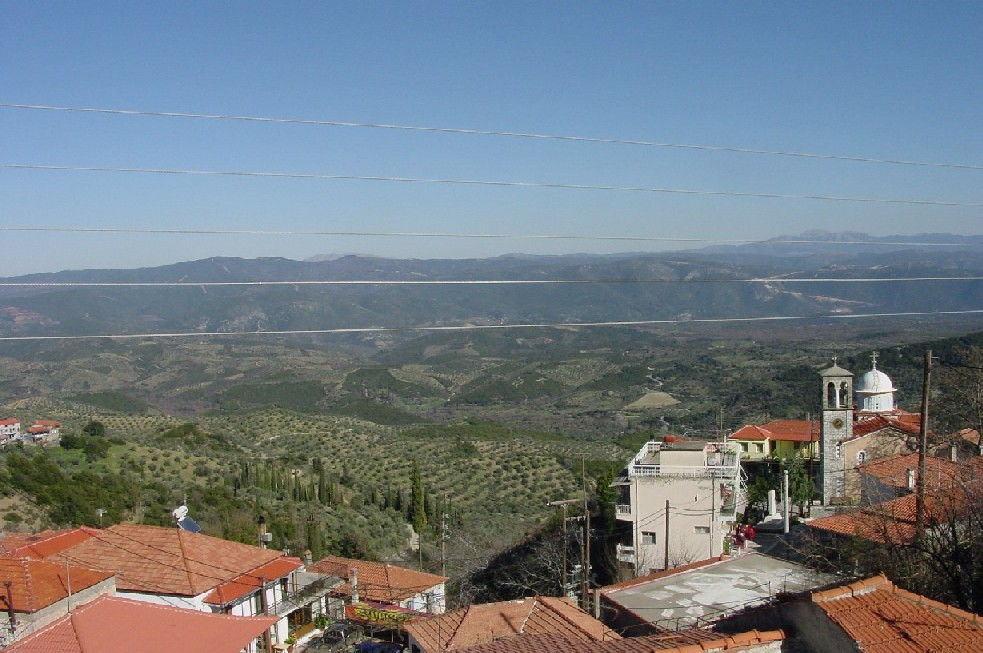
Picture overlooking the fertile Evrotas valley from Longanikos

The village changed location and name many times since the earliest record of its existence in Mycenaean times. The area of Longanikos has been identified with the ancient village of Belemína (Βελεμίνα), documented in ancient writings by Pausanias over 1800 years ago. The current name has been documented in writings as far back as Stefano Magno in 1453. It is believed that this area has been inhabited since Neolithic times, and much later served as a front-line military outpost for the powerful Spartan city-state.

As a result of its geographical position between the 3 prefectures of Messinia, Arcadia, and Laconia and because of the morphology of the ground where Taigetos and Parnonas converge without connecting, thereby creating the Laconian valley of Eurotas, Longanikos has served as a key transit point for the movement of people and armies in the Peloponnese. It had also served as a military staging area and rampart for the state of Sparta.

The town is referred to as Longanik in the Seyahatnâme of Evliya Çelebi, who visited it in 1668, because it was the largest, wealthiest and most strategically important village in upper Laconia. Evliya Çelebi states that many of the inhabitants of Longanikos were Greek Muslims, or 'ahiryan', who he says spoke a dialect of Greek that he calls 'Urumşa', often translated as "Greekish". The large, old Ottoman mansions, many of which are still standing in Longanikos (some derelict and in a state of disrepair, others renovated and still lived in), is clear evidence that some of the Ottoman Greek Muslim families based there were obviously wealthy members of the Ottoman military and administrative elite of the Peloponnese or Mora. Evliya Çelebi also mentions that out of 500 houses only 100 are inhabited as the rest either died because of the recent plague outbreak or fled to the mountains. Çelebi also mentions that the Muslims of the town are converts from the Greeks of the town and that there was only 1 mosque and 11 churches. He also adds that the women of Longanik were producing silk.

Today the village of Longanikos also includes the settlements of Vergadeika, Kiparissi, Giakoumeika, and Foundeika. It is nestled along the green slopes and fir-covered mountain range of Mt. Taigetos and one can find stone houses, natural springs and fountains and forest roads that lead to the highest points of the mountain (Koutouni, Limna). Nearby one can also find some fountains that feed the Eurotas valley and the historical monasteries of Rekitsa and Ampelaki, close to the Arcadian border.

== Economy ==
Most of industry in this area centers around olive cultivation, resulting in the production of olive oil as the main cash crop. The extra virgin olive oil that is produced is of the highest standards and quality and is sought out by olive oil importers globally. Most of the olive oil that is harvested is purchased by large Italian premium olive-oil labels who are known to repackage the local olive oil and brand it as an Italian product.

The younger people are also shifting away from an agriculture-based economy as their primary source of income. As more and more residents drive, they have expanded their job opportunities to commuting to nearby larger cities such as Sparta or Megalopolis where they take public sector or private service and manufacturing jobs.

During the turn of the 20th century and also during the 1960s and 1970s, there was a huge outflow of residents to other major Greek cities, including Athens and Sparta, and also externally to the United States, Canada, Germany, South Africa, and Australia.

This global diaspora of Longanikos emigrants still maintain strong ties with the village and during summer months the population swells with diaspora residents who have returned for summer holidays. In addition to its central location between Sparta and Tripoli, it is also only a 2.5 hour drive from central Athens and within driving distance of many famous sites, including Olympia, Monemvasia, Caves of Dirrou, Githeo, Kalamata, Corinth, the Argolid (Epidavros, Nafplion), amongst others.

== Diaspora ==
A high concentration of emigrants who went to the USA settled in the suburbs of Boston, primarily the towns of Lynn and Lowell, Massachusetts in the 1960s and onward, which historically have been gateway cities in Massachusetts for various immigrant groups from all over the world. In the beginning of the 20th century, Ipswich was also a gateway city. One of the most famous people with ties to Longanikos was Harry Agganis, also known as the "Golden Greek".

== Forest Fires 2007 ==
During the devastating forest fires of 2007, the village was spared any damage. However, the fires came as close as five miles away from the northern direction and also there was extensive devastation on the opposite side of the mountain.
