= John Hancock Student Village =

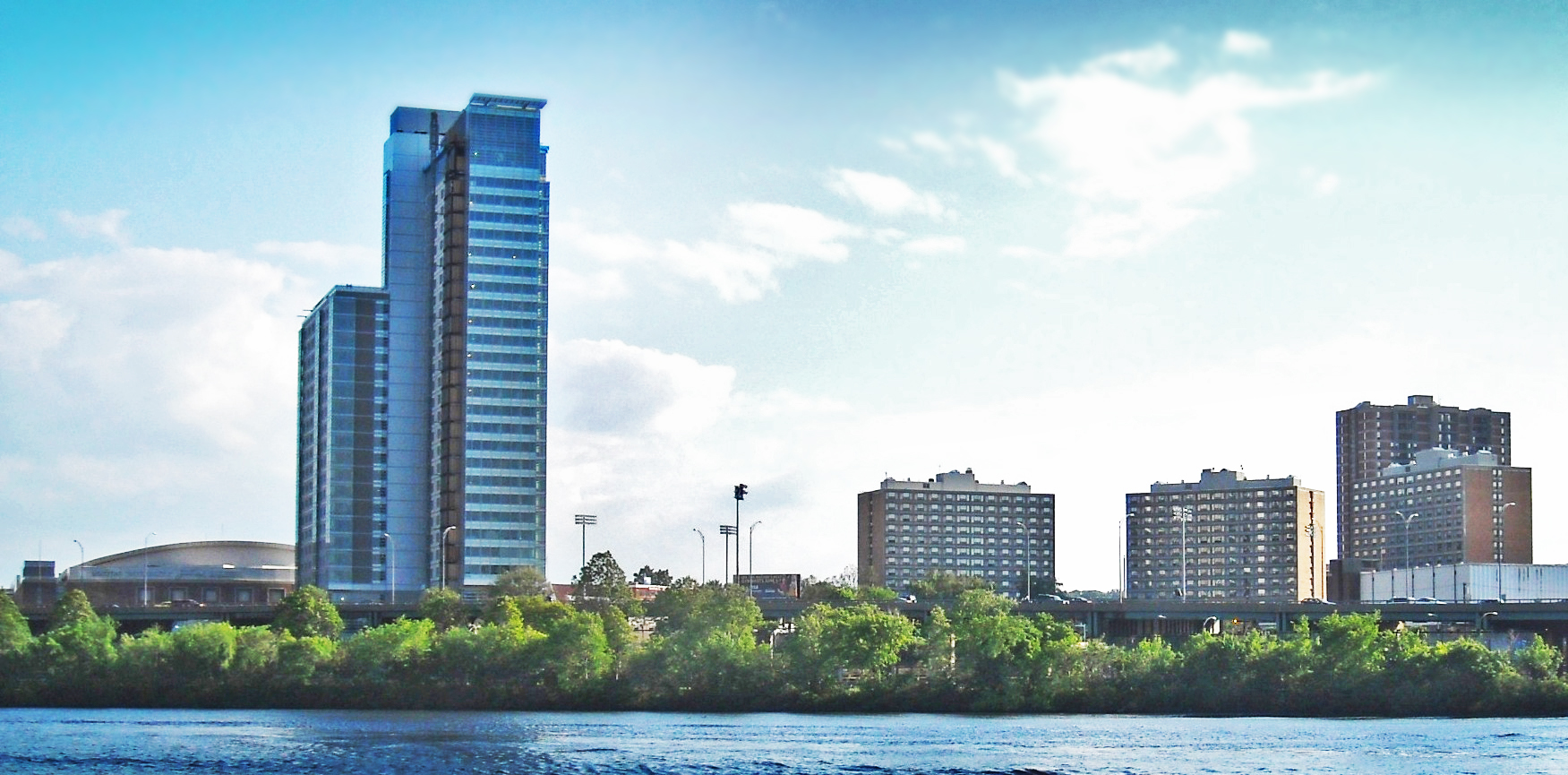
The three dorms of West Campus on the right are dwarfed by the 26-story tower, one of three in StuVi.

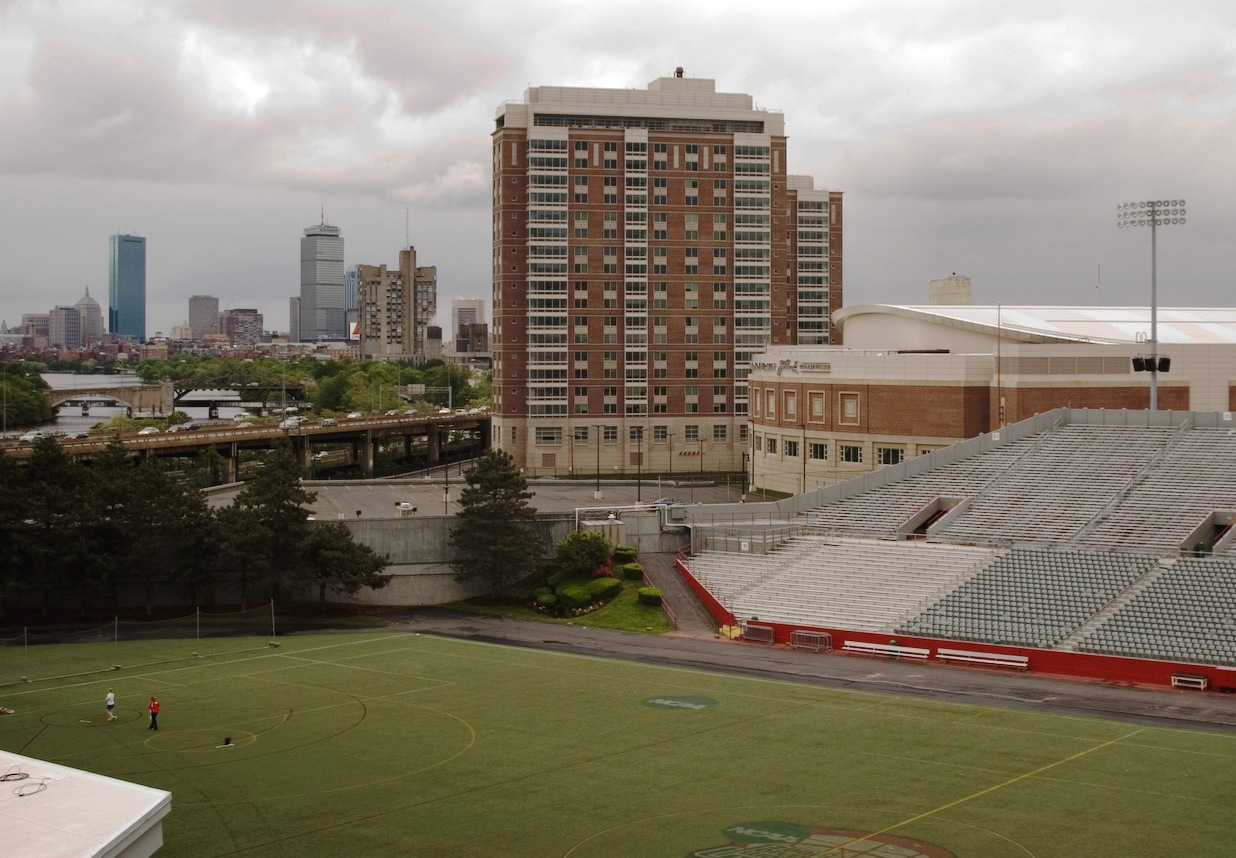
The rear of the John Hancock Student Village, with Nickerson Field in the foreground and Boston in the background, before the construction of StuVii.

The John Hancock Student Village or (StuVi) is a large residential and recreational complex at Boston University, covering 10 acres (40,000 m^{2}) between Buick Street and Nickerson Field, ground formerly occupied by a National Guard Armory, which had been used by the University primarily (but not exclusively) as a storage facility prior to its demolition and the start of construction. The John Hancock Student Village was designed with the intention of fostering community and bridging the divide between East and West campuses.

The student residences at 10 Buick Street (often abbreviated to "StuVi" by students) opened to juniors and seniors in the fall of 2000. 10 Buick Street houses 817 residents in apartment-style living. In 2002, John Hancock Insurance announced its sponsorship of the multimillion-dollar project. The Agganis Arena, named after Harry Agganis, was opened to concerts and hockey games in January 2005. The 7,200-seat arena replaced the smaller Walter Brown Arena for Terrier hockey games and has also been used for concerts, shows, and events.

In March 2005 the final element of phase II of the Student Village complex, the Fitness and Recreation (FitRec) Center, was opened, drawing large crowds from the student body. The center incorporates 6 racquetball and squash courts, a competition pool, a recreational pool, two gymnasia, a jogging track, a lazy river, and a 35-foot (11 m) rock climbing wall, among other sports-related areas.

A 26 and 19-story dorm tower which houses 960 students was finished in late 2009 (often abbreviated "StuVi2" or "StuVii" by students). The Boston Globe ran a cover-page article about it, describing it as "perhaps the most opulent residence hall to ever grace the local college landscape." The student residences and others like it have created somewhat of a controversy, with detractors saying it represents a step further of coddling the younger generation. BU's president, Robert Brown, said the tower will allow the entirety of the 80% of 16,000 undergrads who want to live on campus to be able to do so. Because the school guarantees on-campus housing, freshmen were often shunted into nearby hotels, a practice long criticized by the student newspaper. Brown also said it assuages town and gown relations with local Allston residents in response to studentification.

Plans were made for an additional residence located between the student residences at 33 Harry Agganis Way and 10 Buick Street. The project, known as Student Village III (StuVi3 or StuViii), are currently on hold as a result of the Great Recession.
