= Phalaeseae =

Town of ancient Arcadia

Coordinates: 37°17′20″N 22°10′17″E

Phalaeseae or Phaliesiai (Ancient Greek: Φαλαισίαι) was a town of ancient Arcadia, in the district Maleatis on the road from Megalopolis to Sparta, 20 stadia from the Hermaeum towards Belbina. William Martin Leake originally placed it near Gardhíki, but subsequently a little to the eastward of Bura, where Gell remarked some Hellenic remains among the ruins of the Buzéika Kalyvia.

Modern scholars identify its site near the modern village of Bura.
