= Agganis Arena =

Arena in Boston, Massachusetts, United States

- "The Greek"
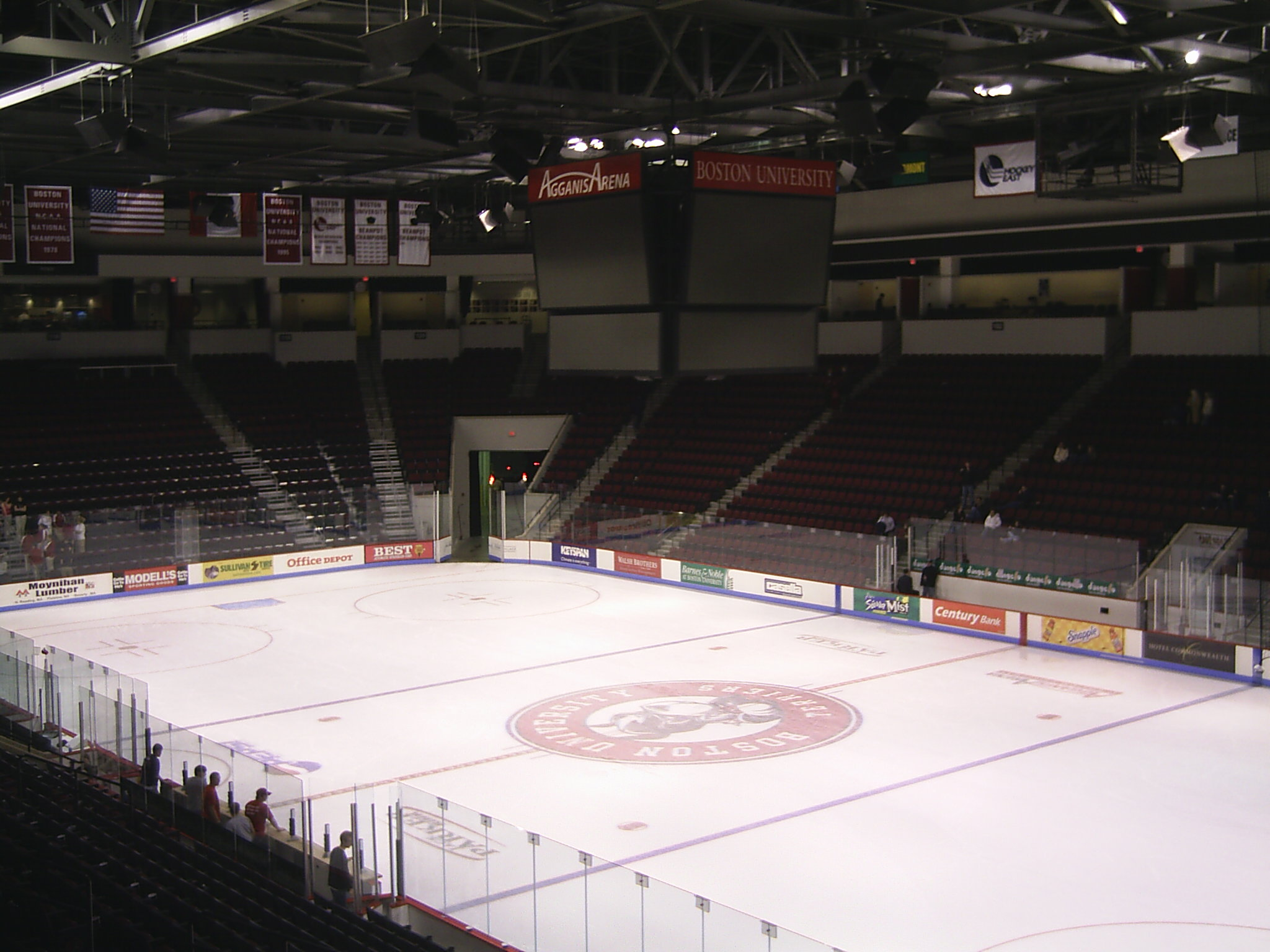
- Interactive map of Agganis Arena
- Address: 925 Commonwealth Avenue
- Location: Boston, Massachusetts, U.S.
- Coordinates: 42°21′08.03″N 71°07′04.05″W
- Owner: Boston University
- Operator: Boston University
- Capacity: Center Stage Concert: 8,000; End Stage Concert: Up to 7,500; Basketball: 6,411; Ice Hockey: 6,150; Theatre Configuration: 1,500-3,500
- Field size: Arena total size = 286,134 gross square feet Ice sheet: 90 ft × 200 ft Basketball floor (portable): 112' × 60'; Portable insulating deck: 90' × 200'
- Public transit: Green Line at Babcock Street

Construction
- Groundbreaking: 2003
- Opened: January 3, 2005
- Cost: $97 million
- Architect: CannonDesign
- Structural engineer: LeMessurier Consultants Inc.
- General contractor: Walsh Brothers/Barton Malow

Tenants
- Boston University Terriers (NCAA) (2005–present); Boston Fleet (PWHL) (2026-present)

Website
- agganisarena.com

Agganis Arena is a 7,200-seat multi-purpose arena in Boston, Massachusetts, United States, on the campus of Boston University, built on the location of the former Commonwealth Armory. It is home to the five-time national champion Boston University Terriers men's ice hockey team. It is named after Harry Agganis, a football and baseball player for BU. The ice hockey rink is named Jack Parker Rink, after the legendary BU hockey player and coach. The arena is part of Boston University's John Hancock Student Village, which also includes dormitories and the university's five-story Fitness and Recreation Center.

Agganis was dedicated in 2004 and hosted its first event in 2005. It replaced Walter Brown Arena, located at the Case Athletic Center, as the home of BU Men's Ice Hockey, though Walter Brown Arena is still in use as the home of BU Women's Ice Hockey. The BU basketball team played games at the arena until 2015, before moving back to Case Gym.

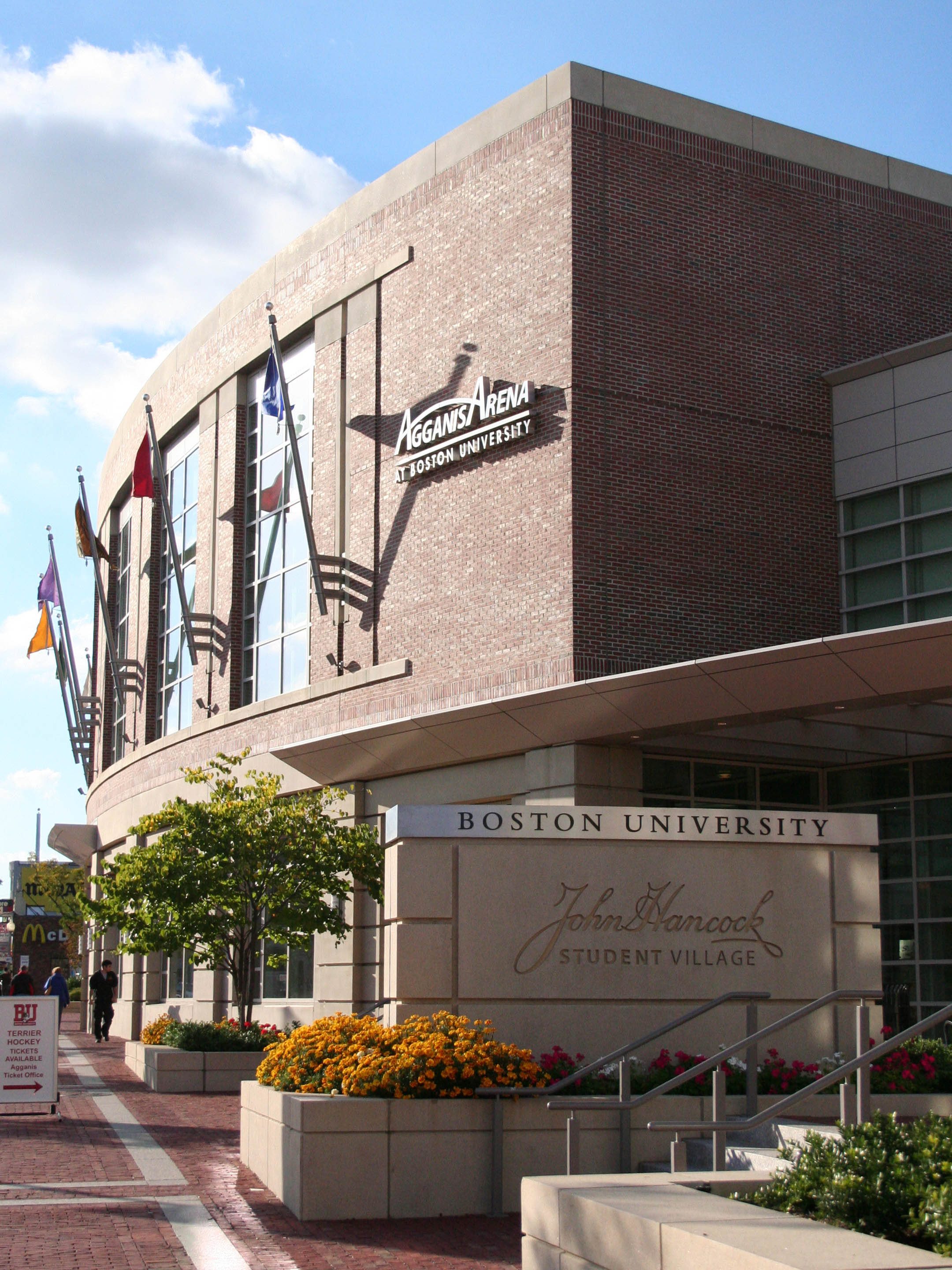
The exterior of the Agganis Arena

Agganis serves as a regional auditorium for large events, including concerts, ceremonies of other schools such as Berklee College of Music, musicals, awareness events, and appearances by speakers such as Barack Obama and Dave Chappelle.

Since 2008, Agganis has hosted the annual CRASH-B World Indoor Rowing Championship.

== History ==
=== Development ===
BU's men's ice hockey team had previously played at Walter Brown Arena for 33 years. The arena only has a capacity of 3,806, and so a larger, newer arena was desired by university leaders. Walter Brown was known for being extremely loud during high attendance games due to its low ceiling, creating a home advantage. Coach Jack Parker consulted with architects when designing the rink to ensure that the volume level would remain high. The ice rink in the arena would eventually be dedicated to him.

The arena was constructed as part of BU's $325 million John Hancock Student Village, a 10-acre site hosting sports, fitness, and residential facilities for students. The location borders Commonwealth Avenue, on the site of the old Commonwealth Armory, which was purchased by BU in the 1980s and demolished in 2002. In 2004, the Fitness and Recreation Center was completed next door as part of the village project. The arena was completed in 2004 at a cost of $97 million and held its first ice hockey game in 2005.

=== Naming ===
The arena is named after Harry Agganis, a two-sport football and baseball athlete for BU and a player for the Boston Red Sox. Agganis died at 26 from a massive pulmonary embolism. A life-size bronze statue of Agganis sculpted by Armand LaMontagne stands outside the arena at the corner of Commonwealth Avenue and Harry Agganis Way. The hockey rink is named Jack Parker Rink, after the legendary BU hockey player and coach.

=== Ice hockey ===
The arena's main tenant since it was opened is the BU men's ice hockey team. The student section for the team sits in Section 118 and is called the "Dog Pound". The upper level of section 118 is reserved for the BU Pep Band. The Dog Pound is known for chants directed at opposing goaltenders.

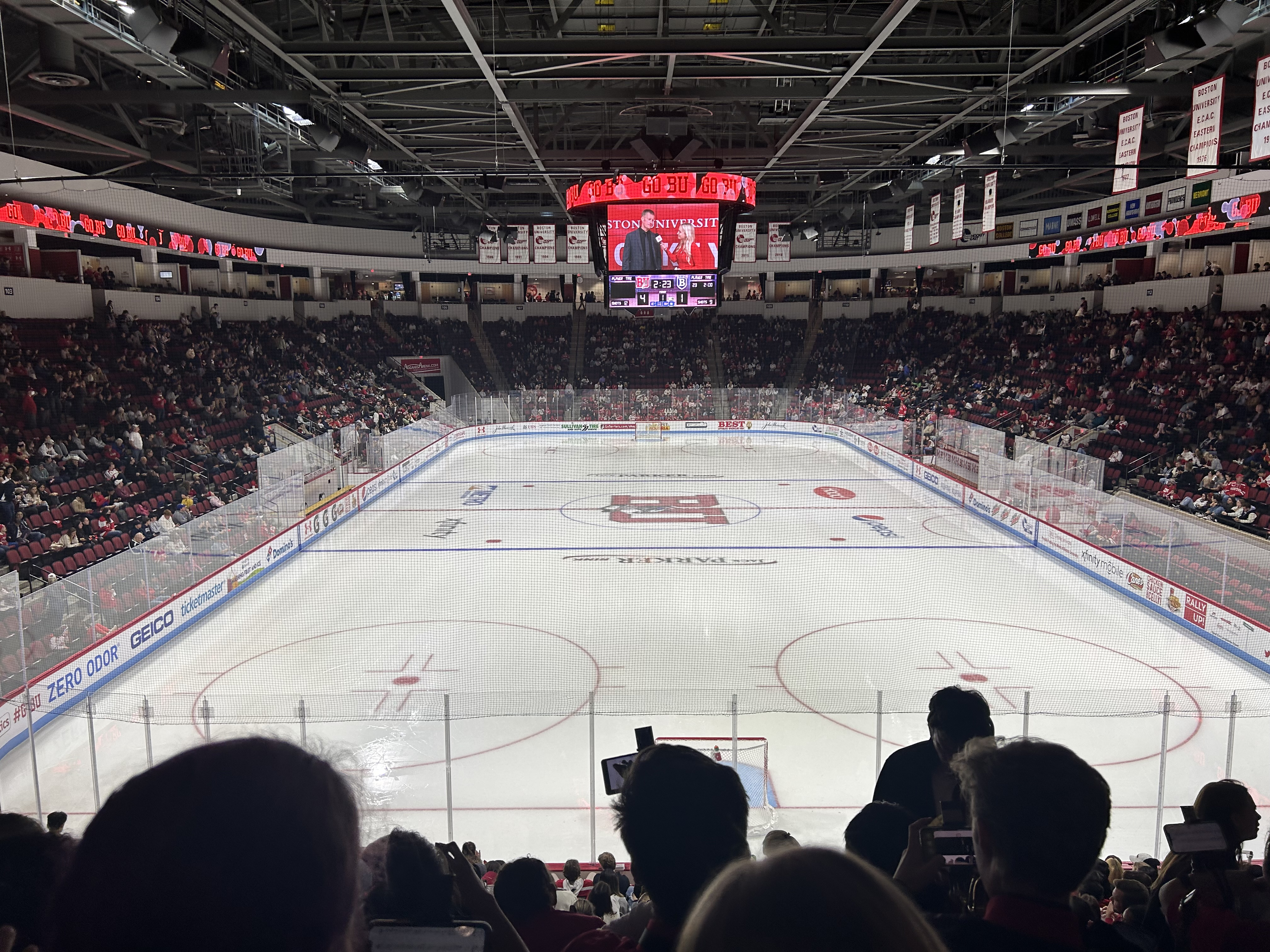
View from the student section between periods at a hockey game

The women's team continues to play in Walter Brown Arena, but select tournaments and games have been played at the arena. The arena hosted the 2009 Women's Frozen Four. The venue was also scheduled to host the 2020 Women's Frozen Four before the tournament was cancelled due to the COVID-19 pandemic.

The Boston Fleet of the Professional Women's Hockey League played 2 games of the 2024-2025 season at the arena: March 8, 2025 against the Montreal Victoire and March 26, 2025 against the Toronto Sceptres. During the 2025–2026 season, the Fleet played at least four games at the Agganis Arena in an effort to expand their presence in the City of Boston. In July, 2026, the team announced that Agganis will be their primary home for the 2026-2027 season.

=== Basketball ===
In the arena's first decade, Boston University basketball played select home games at Agganis, with the remainder being played at Case Gym. The school made the decision before the 2015–2016 season to move all home games back to Case Gym due to poor attendance at Agganis. The last BU basketball game played at Agganis was a 77–70 loss to rival Holy Cross on Feb. 28, 2015.

Agganis Arena hosted the first rounds of the 2007 America East men's basketball tournament and the finals in 2011.

=== Other events ===
Agganis is used for various graduation ceremonies at BU and other schools.

The arena hosted TNA Wrestling's anniversary show Slammiversary on June 2, 2013. It hosted the 2026 edition of the event on June 28, 2026.

In January 2018, the arena hosted the playoff stage for the ELEAGUE Major tournament for Counter-Strike: Global Offensive. It was the first time in the game's history that a North American team (Cloud9) won a major-level tournament.

On October 9, 2019, professional wrestling promotion All Elite Wrestling (AEW) held the second episode of its live weekly television show AEW Dynamite at the arena. AEW returned to the Agganis Arena for its October 27, 2021 episode of Dynamite. That week's episode of AEW Rampage was also taped at the arena following the Dynamite taping. AEW returned once again on April 6, 2022 for a live episode of Dynamite, as well as tapings of AEW Rampage and AEW Dark: Elevation.

The Rocket League Championship Series 2023 Spring Major was held at the arena from July 6 to 9, 2023, with a live audience present on July 8 and 9. The event was won by Team Vitality, who beat fellow European side Team BDS in the Final to completely sweep the Spring Split, having previously won the EU Spring Open, Spring Cup and Spring Invitational.

== See also ==
- List of NCAA Division I basketball arenas

Preceded by Walter Brown Arena	Home of Boston University Terriers men's ice hockey 2005–current	Succeeded by incumbent
Preceded by College Park Center	Host of Slammiversary; 2013 (XI)	Succeeded by College Park Center
