= Theodore Spyropoulos =

Greek archeologist

Theodore Spyropoulos (Greek: Θεόδωρος Σπυρόπουλος) is a Greek archeologist who is a regional official of Greece's Central Archaeological Council.

== Excavations at Tanagra ==
At Tanagra, Spyropoulos began excavating a large Mycenaean cemetery in 1968. Every year, until Spyropoulos moved to the ephorate at Sparta, the excavation site yielded larnakes, pottery and terracottas. The chamber tombs uncovered were apparently in use from LH IIIA up until the end of LH IIIB and perhaps beyond.

== Excavations near Thebes ==
Near Thebes, Spyropoulos excavated the supposed tomb of Amphion and Zethus between 1971 and 1973. He identified the structure of the tomb as a step-pyramid or ziggurat built during the 3rd millennium BC.

== Excavations at Pellana ==
Spyropoulos discovered an alternative site for the palace of Menelaus at Pellana located 25 kilometers north of Sparta. The site itself is near a series of large Mycenean chamber tombs. This has led Spyropoulos to believe that his excavations uncovered the lost Homeric capital of Laconia. The palace itself is 32 meters by 14 meters and is dated to around 1200 BC. Cyclopean walls surround the palace and a wide road leads up to the entrance. During Antiquity, the tombs were all plundered. However, the palace was unscathed since it yielded jewelry, wall paintings, pottery, and a plethora of Linear B tablets. Currently, there exists a major clash of interpretation between Spyropoulos and members of the British School at Athens. The former believes that Pellana was the Mycenean capital of Laconia and the latter believe that the Menelaion was the capital.

== Sources ==
- Carter, Jane Burr and Morris, Sarah P. The Ages of Homer: A Tribute to Emily Townsend Vermeule. University of Texas Press, 1995. ISBN 0-292-71208-1
- Castleden, Rodney. Mycenaeans. Routledge, 2005. ISBN 0-415-24923-6
- Fagan, Garrett G. Archaeological Fantasies: How pseudoarchaeology misrepresents the past and misleads the public. Routledge, 2006. ISBN 0-415-30593-4
