= Case Gym =

Multi-purpose arena in Boston, Massachusetts

Case Gymnasium
- "The Roof"
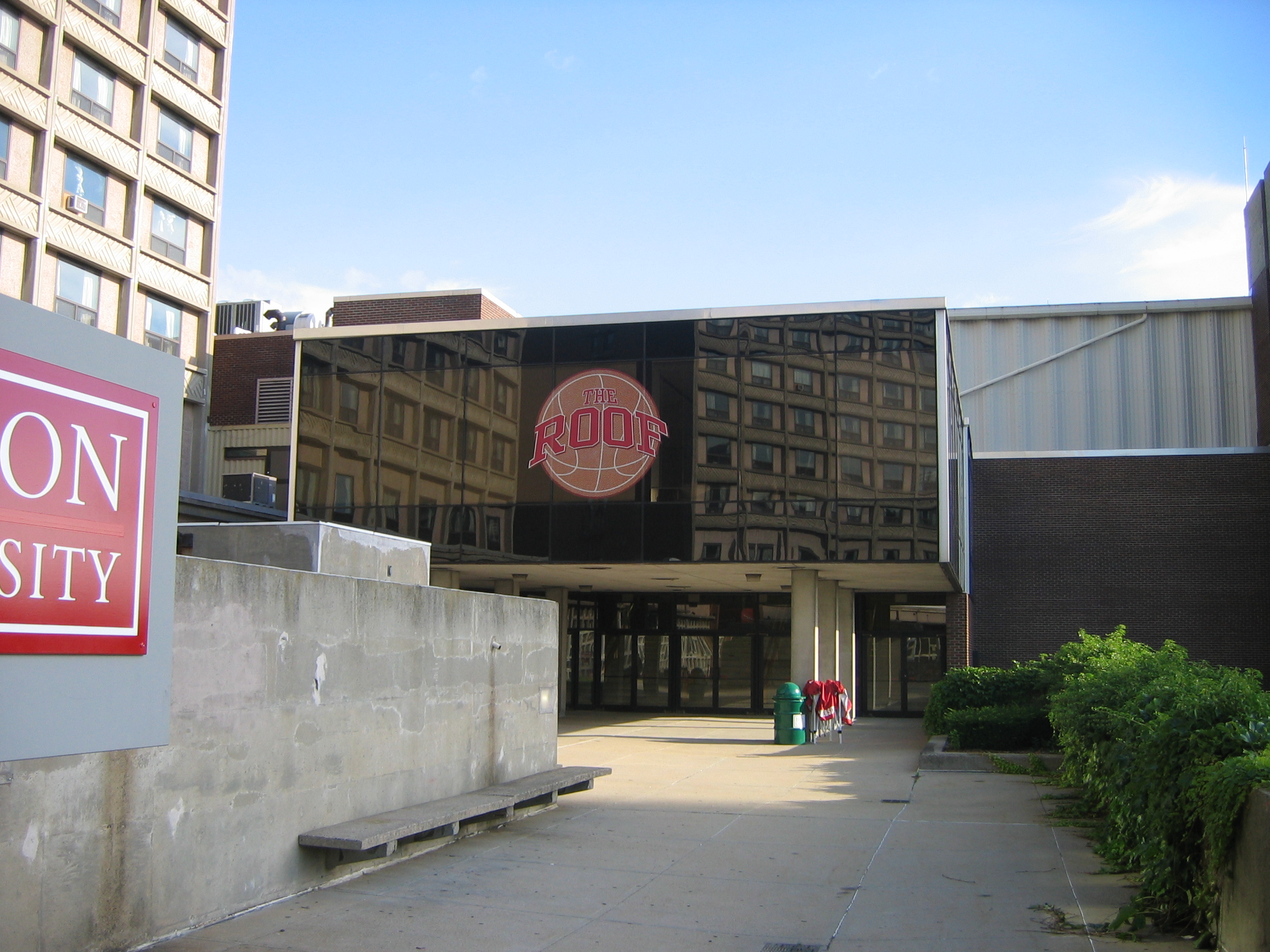
- Interactive map of Case Gymnasium
- Address: 285 Babcock Street
- Location: Boston, Massachusetts
- Coordinates: 42.353932°N 71.120355°W
- Owner: Boston University
- Operator: Boston University
- Capacity: 1,800
- Public transit: Framingham/Worcester Line at Boston Landing; Green Line at Babcock Street

Construction
- Opened: 1972

Tenants
- Boston University men's basketball (1972–1982, 1983–1985, 1993–present); Boston University women's basketball (1975–present)

Case Gym is a 1,800-seat multi-purpose arena at Boston University in Boston, Massachusetts. It opened in 1972 as part of the Harold Case Physical Education Center, which is named after the university's fifth president, Harold C. Case.

The gym is referred to as "The Roof" because it is located on the top level of the building, above Walter Brown Arena. It is home to the Boston University Terriers men's and women's basketball teams, as well as the men's wrestling team. Basketball games are also played in Agganis Arena, and on occasion Walter Brown Arena. When Boston University left the America East Conference for the Patriot League in July 2013, they announced that all home men's basketball conference games would be played at Agganis Arena, with the non-conference games to be played at Case.

Case Gym hosted the championship games of the 1997 and 2002 America East Conference men's basketball tournament as well as the championship game of the 2011 America East Conference women's basketball tournament. It has also hosted Ring Of Honor Wrestling Shows through wrestling promoter and Boston University alumnus Mike "Mongoose" Coughlin.

The center, whose recreational use has declined since the opening of the Fitness and Recreation Center adjacent to Agganis Arena, is approximately located where the left field "pavilion" seats at Braves Field were before the Boston Braves, a Major League Baseball club, were relocated to Milwaukee in 1953.

Preceded by Sargent Gym	Home of Boston University Terriers men's basketball 1972 – 1982	Succeeded by Walter Brown Arena
Preceded by Walter Brown Arena	Home of Boston University Terriers men's basketball 1983 – 1985	Succeeded by Walter Brown Arena
Preceded by Walter Brown Arena	Home of Boston University Terriers men's basketball 1993 – present	Succeeded by incumbent

== See also ==
- List of NCAA Division I basketball arenas
