= Tripolis (region of Laconia) =

Tripolis (Greek: Τρίπολις; meaning "three cities") was a district in ancient Laconia, Greece, southeast of Megalopolis, comprising the three cities of Belmina, Aegys, and Pellana.
