= Walter Brown Arena =

Sports arena in Boston, Massachusetts

Coordinates: 42.354029°N 71.120312°W

Walter A. Brown Arena Memorial Skating Pavilion
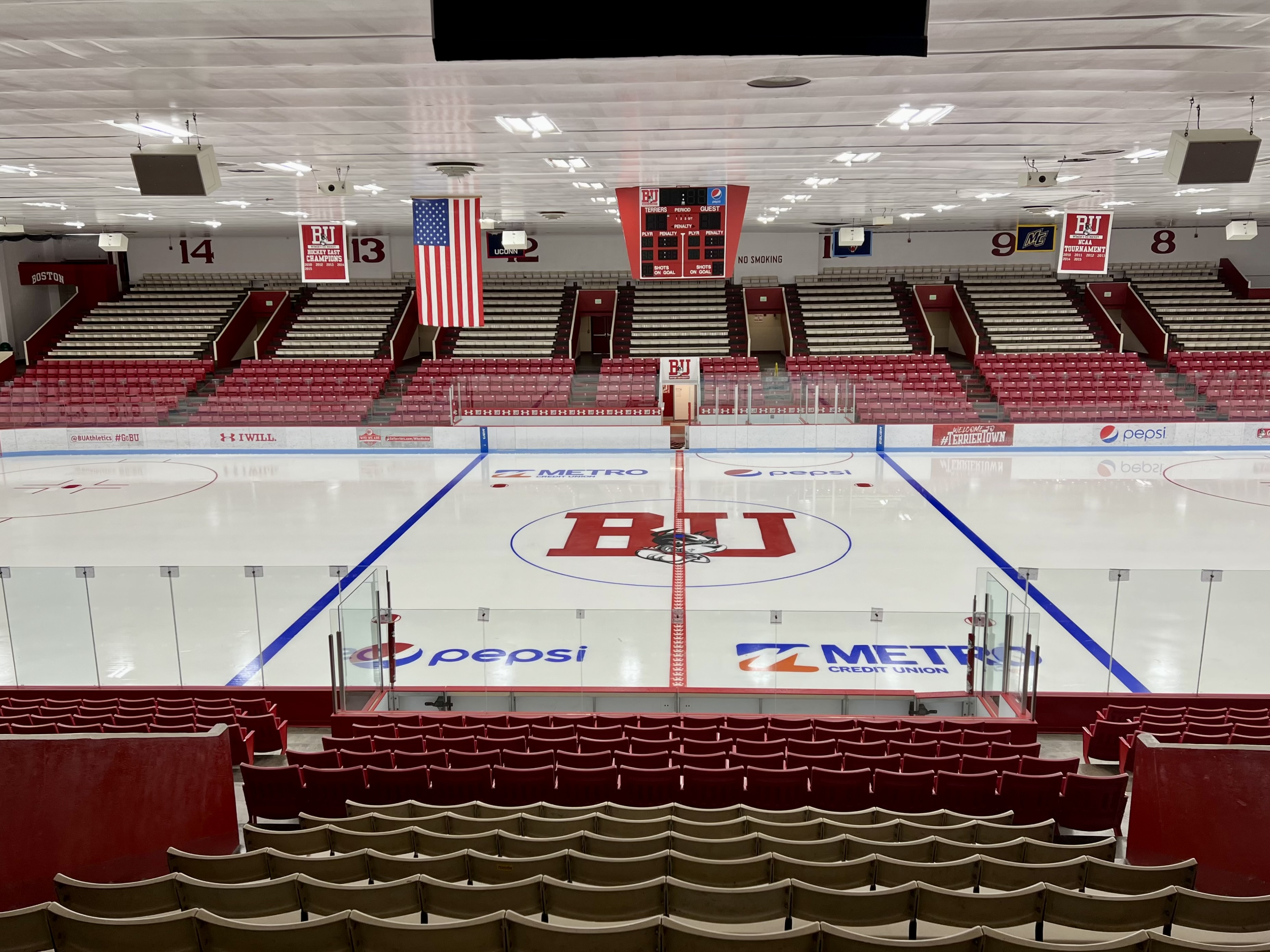
- Walter Brown Arena in 2022
- Interactive map of Walter A. Brown Arena Memorial Skating Pavilion
- Address: 285 Babcock St
- Location: Boston, Massachusetts
- Owner: Boston University
- Operator: Boston University
- Capacity: 3,806 (hockey)
- Public transit: Green Line at Babcock Street

Construction
- Opened: 1971

Tenants
- Boston University Terriers men's ice hockey (1971–2005); Boston University Terriers men's basketball (1982–1983, 1985–1993); Suffolk University men's ice hockey (2001–2015); Boston University Terriers women's ice hockey (2005–present); Catholic Memorial School boys' ice hockey

Walter Brown Arena is a 3,806-seat multi-purpose arena in Boston, Massachusetts, United States. It is home to the Boston University Terriers women's ice hockey team and hosted the men's team before they moved to Agganis Arena. It is named in honor of Walter A. Brown, the original owner of the Boston Celtics, former president of the Boston Bruins and second manager of the Boston Garden (after his father). The arena is part of the Harold Case Physical Education Center, which includes Case Gym directly above the arena, as well as the former home of student recreation before the opening of the John Hancock Student Village. The building lies in the general area of the left field pavilion seats at the former Braves Field, whose right field pavilion and a portion of the field have been converted to neighboring Nickerson Field.

It hosted the first rounds of the 2003 and 2004 America East Conference men's basketball tournaments. It is the practice rink for the three-time National Champion Boston University figure skating team (2009, 2010, and 2017). It is also the home rink for Boston University's men's and women's club ice hockey teams.

While it is the home of four BU men's hockey NCAA championships, one of its most famous events occurred in October 1995, when Travis Roy, a 20-year-old freshman hockey player, lost his balance attempting to make a check eleven seconds into his first collegiate hockey shift versus North Dakota, breaking his neck at the fourth vertebra and paralyzing him from the neck down. In 1999, his jersey number 24 became the first retired number in program history.

The BU men's hockey team returned to Walter Brown for the first time in nearly ten years on December 19, 2014 for an exhibition game against the United States men's national junior ice hockey team.

On December 30, 2022, the BU men's hockey team returned to Walter Brown for the first regular season game held with fans since January 2, 2005. Senior Captain Dom Fensore netted the OT winner to defeat Harvard, 2–1.

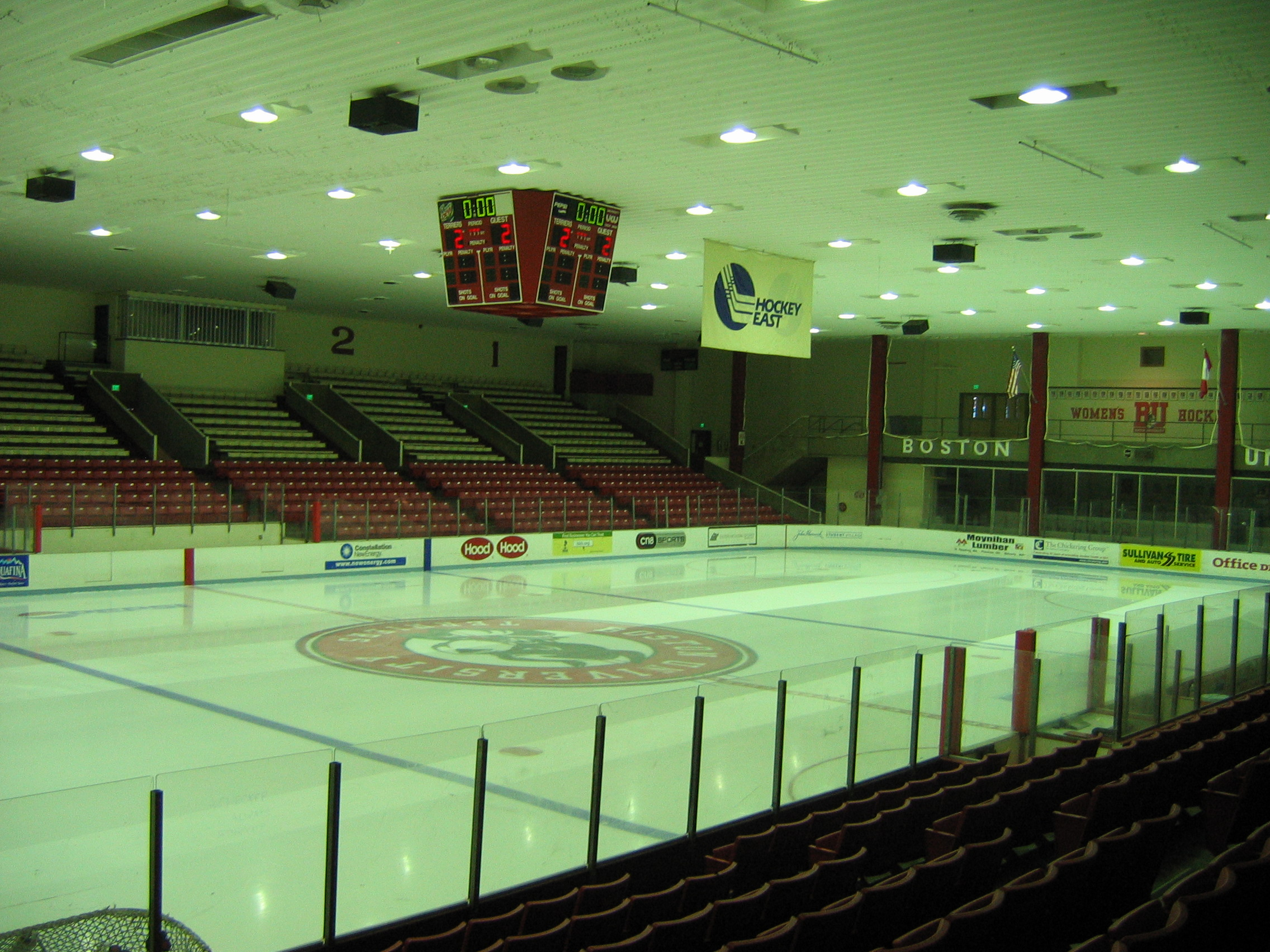
Walter Brown Arena in 2008

Walter Brown Arena received significant upgrades prior to the 2024–25 season, including new locker rooms and training facilities for the women's ice hockey program. The renovation also added a center-hung video board from Daktronics, the first in the arena's history. The women's ice hockey team played its fall semester home games at Agganis Arena to accommodate the project.

Preceded by Boston Arena	Home of Boston University Terriers men's ice hockey 1971–2005	Succeeded by Agganis Arena
