= Petros Roumpos =

Greek sculptor, painter and artist

- Born: 1873; Georgitsi
- Died: 1942 (aged 68–69); Athens, Greece

Petros Roumpos (Greek: Πέτρος Ρούμπος; 1873–1942) was a Greek sculptor, painter and artist of the 19th and 20th centuries.

== Biography ==
Roumpos was born in Georgitsi, near Sparta in 1873. He studied painting and sculpting at the Athens School of Fine Arts with professors such as Nikephoros Lytras and Broutos.

Roumpos drew mostly portraits and busts, such the ones of architect Aristotelis Zahos, poet and playwright Polyvios Dimitrakopoulos, Rigas Feraios, Athanasios Diakos and others.

A marble bust that he made of the poet Lorentzos Mavilis is placed at the square of the same name in Athens. The artist used Mavilis' actual traits, due to the fact that Mavilis himself, at the age of 53, posed for Petros Roumpos. The bust was placed at its current location by Athens Municipality in 1938. The same bust exists in three additional copies: in Corfu, Ioannina and at the Offices of Greek Writers.

Petros Roumpos' work includes funerary monuments, such as that of the family of Georgios Athenogenous (1910), with a seated winged figure, at the First Cemetery of Athens, as well as the Monument dedicated to the high priests in Tripoli, with engraved details of the acts of the Arcadians during the Greek War of Independence. He also created heroons in Magoula, Sparti and in Chios.

Petros Roumpos died in Athens in February 1942.

== Gallery ==
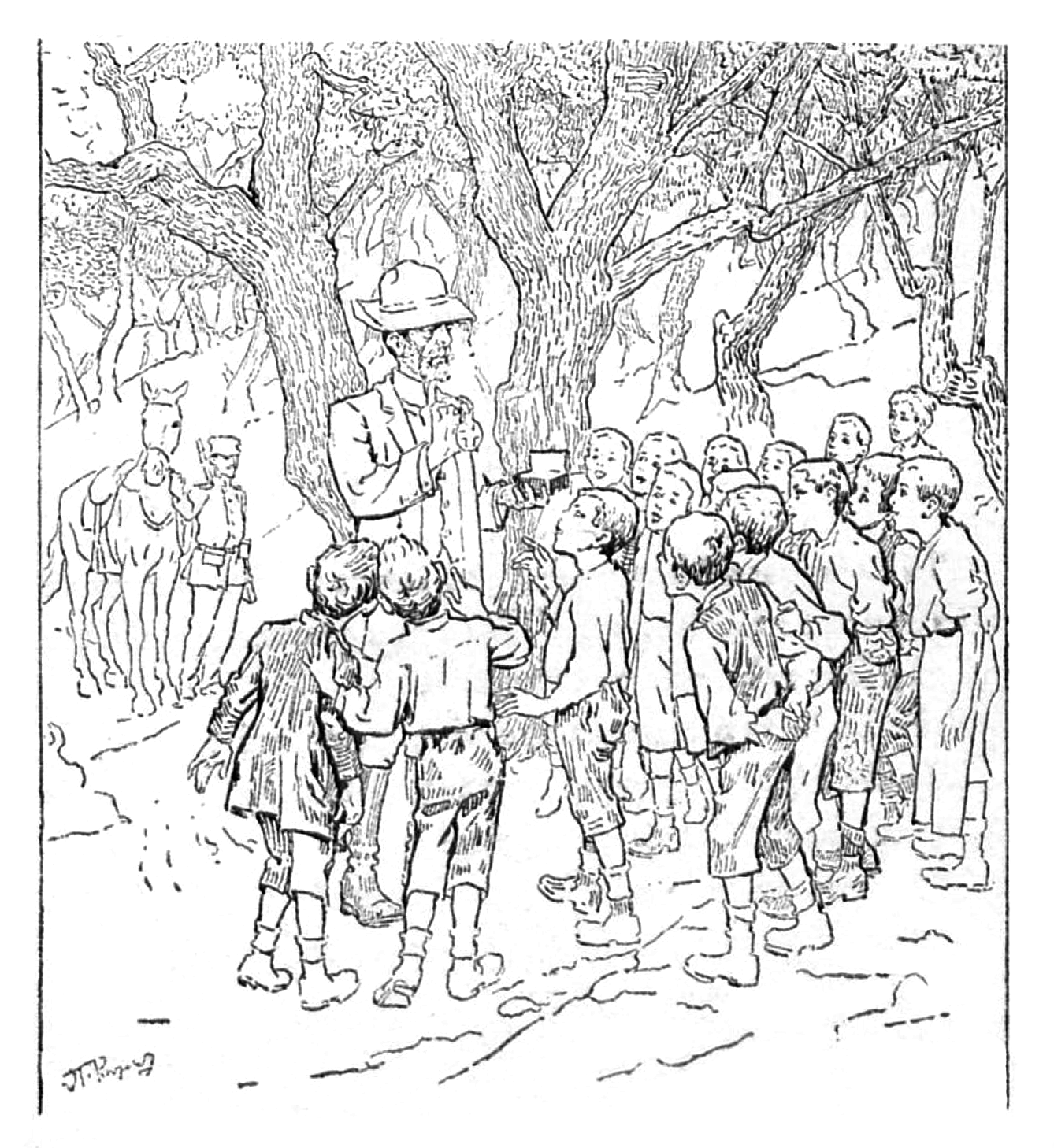
"Ceremony" by Petros Roumpos

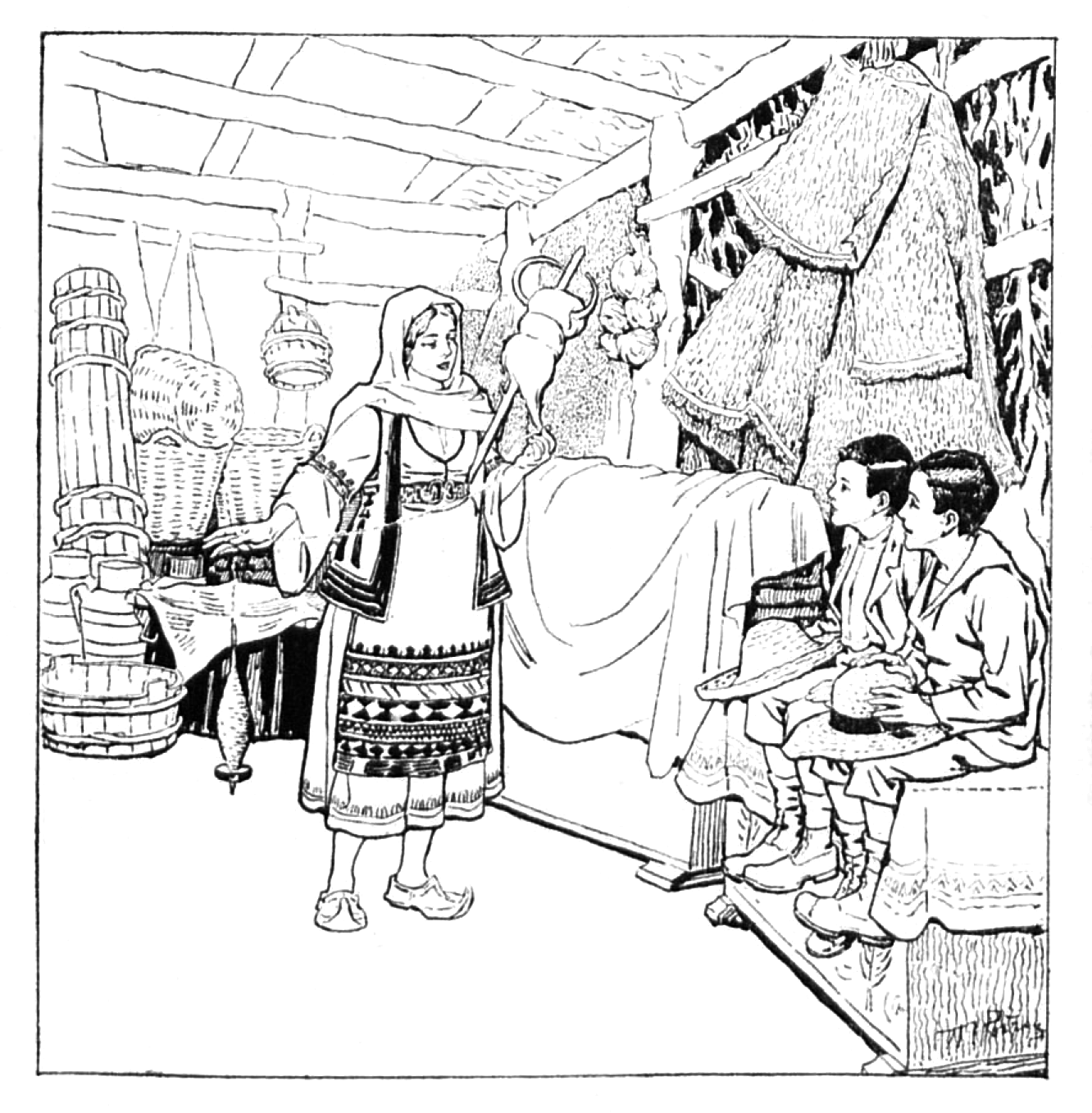
"Vlach girl" by Petros Roumpos

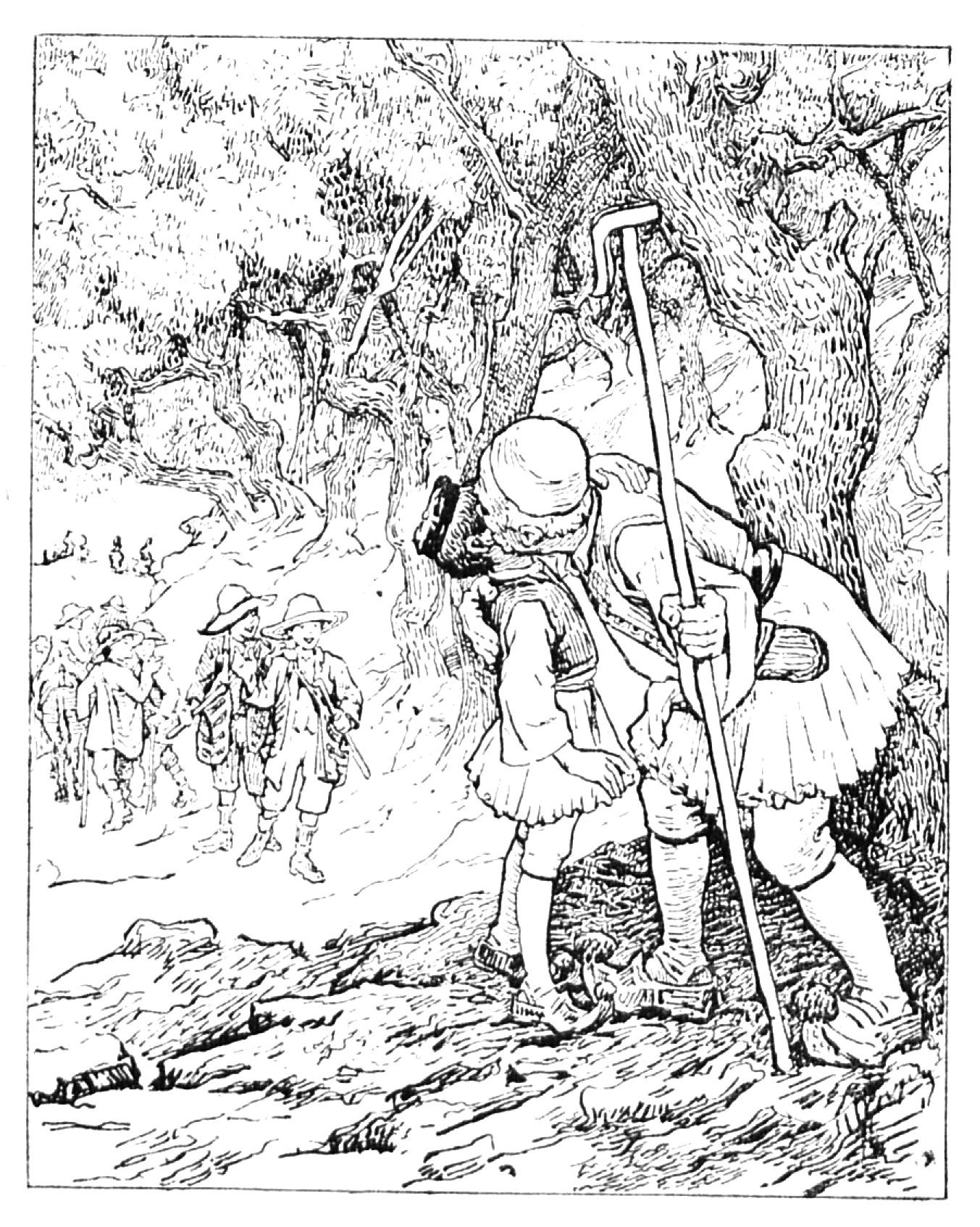
"The return" by Petros Roumpos

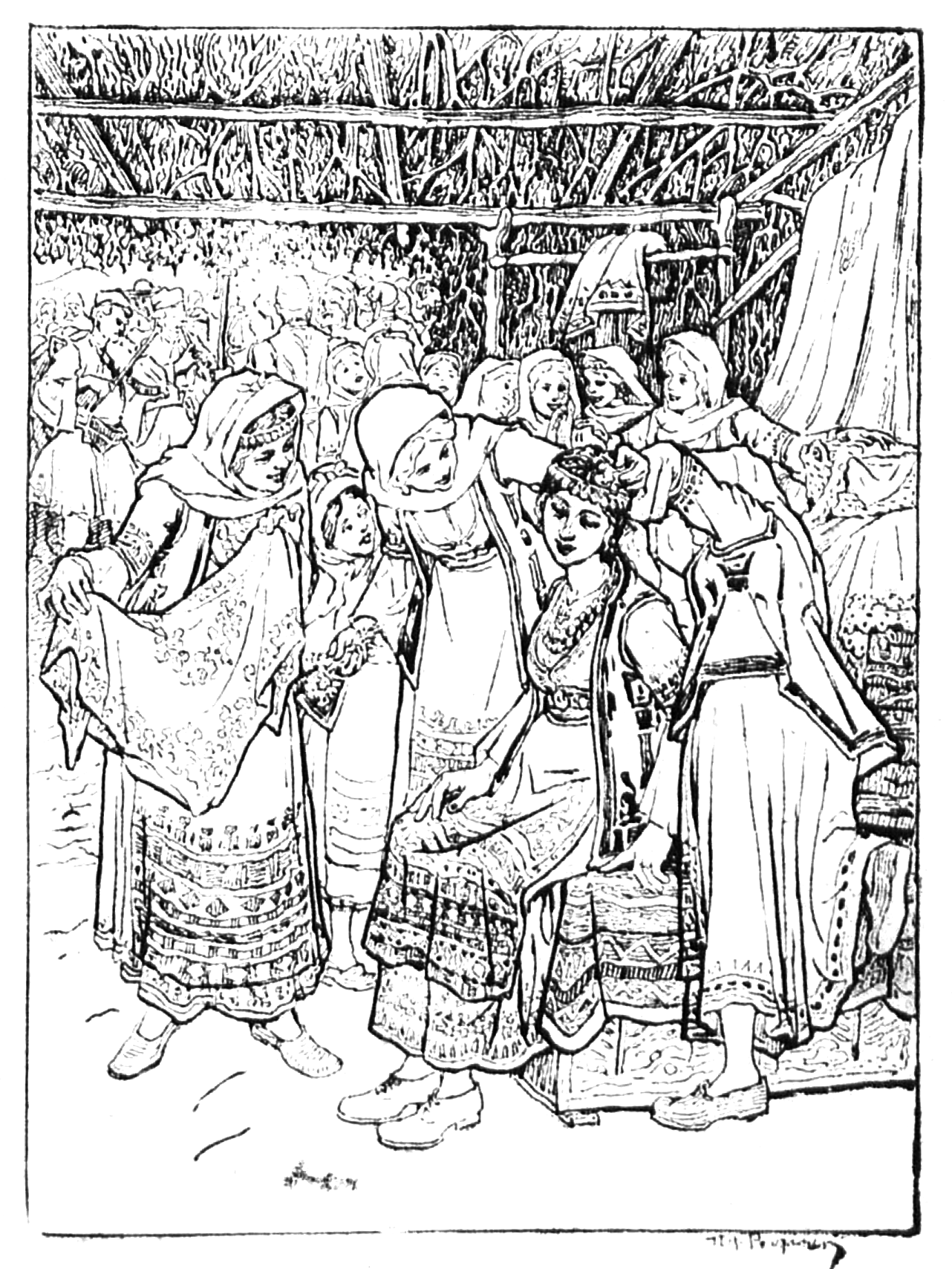
"The wedding" by Petros Roumpos

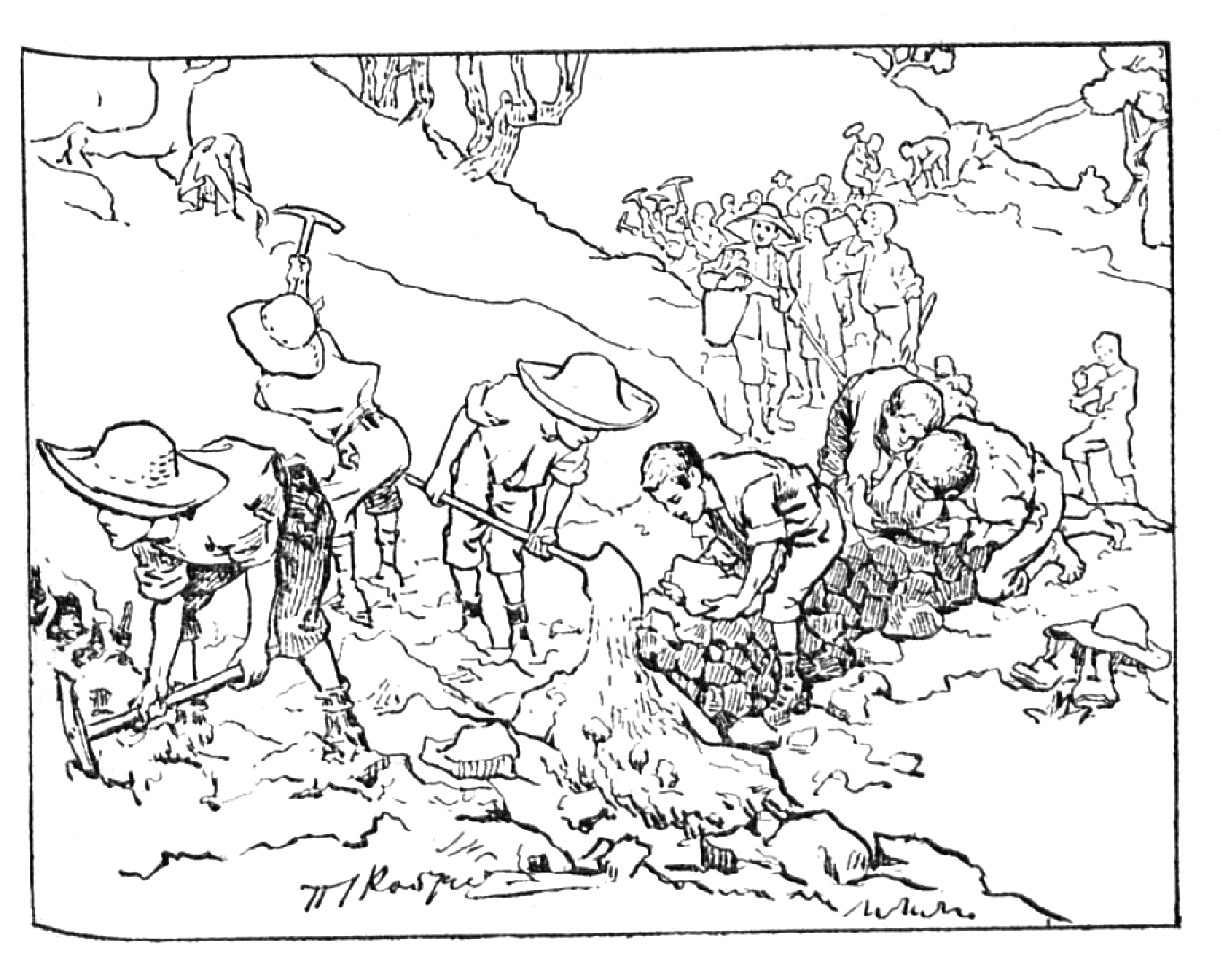
"The way" by Petros Roumpos

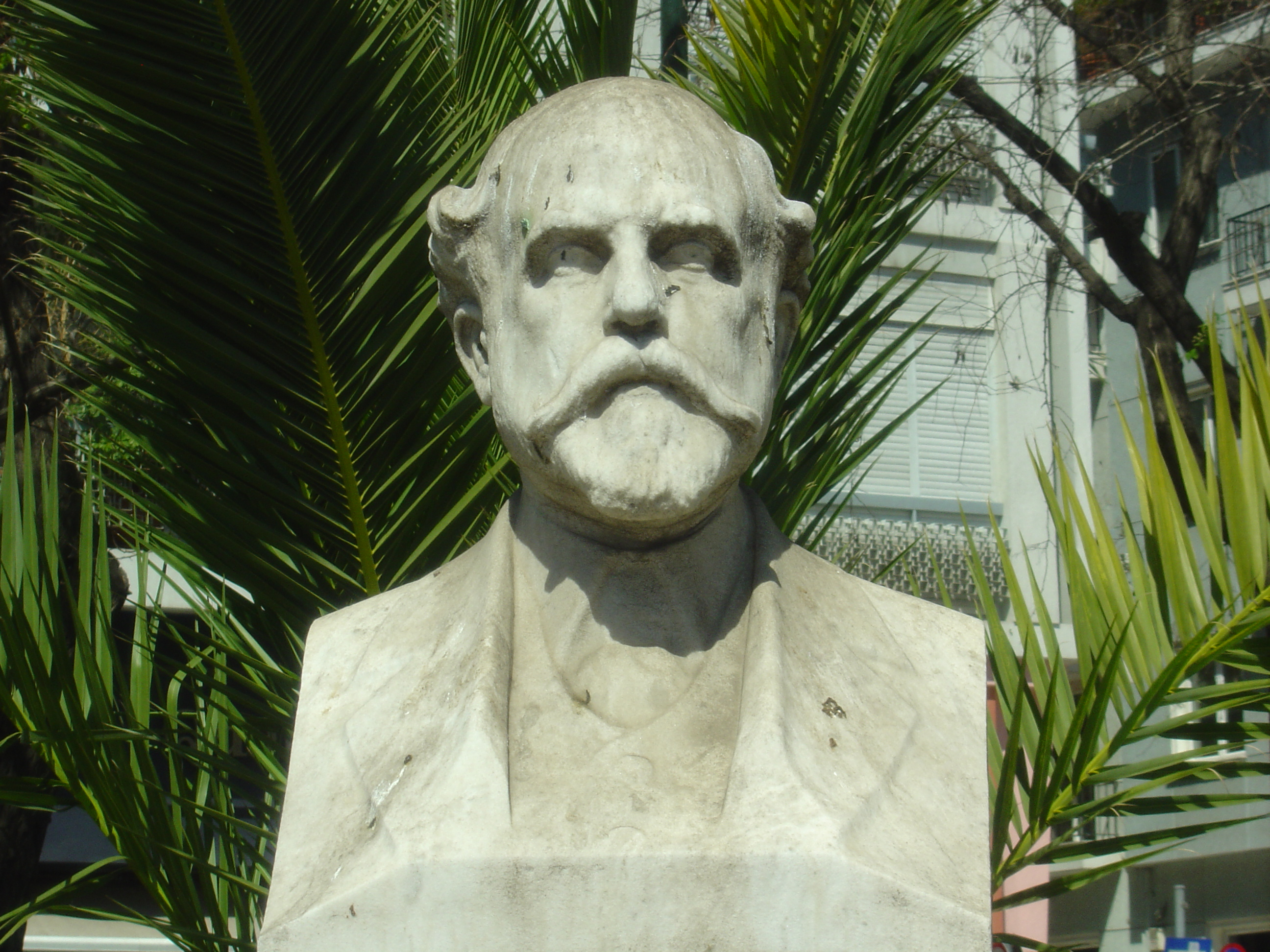
Bust of the poet Lorentzos Mavilis at Mavilis square in Athens.

== Sources ==
- Εγκυκλοπαίδεια Πάπυρος-Λαρούς-Μπριτάνικα, λήμμα "Ρούμπος, Πέτρος", τόμ. 52, σελ. 297, Εκδόσεις Πάπυρος, Αθήνα, 1996.
- Ζέττα Αντωνοπούλου: "Τα γλυπτά της Αθήνας: Υπαίθρια γλυπτική 1834 – 2004", σελ. 93, 94, 98 & 206, α΄ έκδοση, Εκδόσεις "Ποταμός", Αθήνα, 2003.
- Στέλιος Λυδάκης: "Οι Έλληνες Γλύπτες – Η νεοελληνική γλυπτική: ιστορία – τυπολογία – λεξικό γλυπτών", τόμ. 5ος, σελ. 444, Εκδοτικός οίκος "ΜΕΛΙΣΣΑ", Αθήνα, 1981.
