= Georgitsi =

Georgitsi Γεωργίτσι
- Community
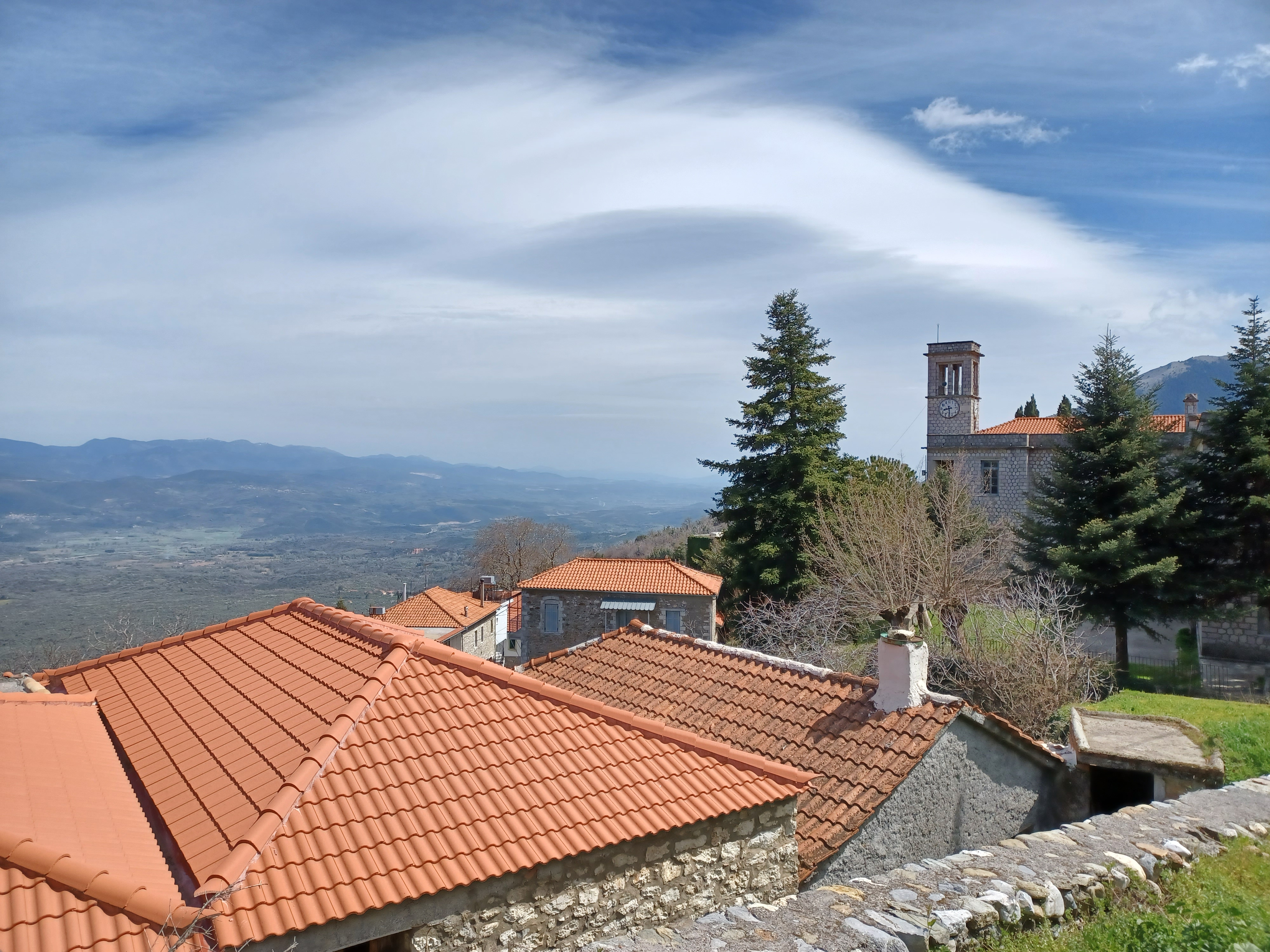
- Georgitsi

- Location within Greece
- Coordinates: 37°11′17″N 22°16′41″E
- Country: Greece
- Administrative region: Peloponnese
- Regional unit: Laconia
- Municipality: Sparta
- Municipal unit: Pellana

Population (2021)
  - Community: 237
- Time zone: UTC+2 (EET)
  - Summer (DST): UTC+3 (EEST)

Georgitsi (Greek: Γεωργίτσι) is a village in the Taygetus mountain range 28 km away from the city of Sparta in southern Greece. Georgitsi belongs to the municipal unit of Pellana, situated in the state of Laconia, in southeastern Peloponnesus. It is situated at an altitude of between 900 and 1200m above sea level. The village is very much known for its revolt against the Ottoman Turks in the 18th century. The village is named after a shepherd named Georgitsis who settled in that area, the village had a small bazaar, and from then on it grew on to a town. The painter and sculptor Petros Roumpos was born in Georgitsi. As of 2021, the village has a population of 237 people.
