= Belemina =

Town of ancient Laconia and ancient Arcadia

Coordinates: 37°16′43″N 22°17′13″E

Belemina (Ancient Greek: Βελεμίνα), or Belmina (Βέλμινα), or Belbina (Βελβίνα), or Blenina (Βλένινα), was a town of ancient Laconia and ancient Arcadia, at the northwest frontier of the former, the territory of which was called Belminatis (Βελμινᾶτις). It was originally an Arcadian town, but was conquered by the Lacedaemonians at an early period, and annexed to their territory; although Pausanias does not believe this statement. After the Battle of Leuctra, Belemina was restored to Arcadia, reckoned to be part of Aegytis; most of its inhabitants were removed to the newly founded city of Megalopolis; and the place continued to be a dependency of the latter city. In the wars of the Achaean League, the Belminatis was a constant source of contention between the Spartans and Achaeans. Under Machanidas or Nabis, the tyrants of Sparta, the Belminatis was again annexed to Laconia; but upon the subjugation of Sparta by Philopoemen in 188 BCE, the Belminatis was once more annexed to the territory of Megalopolis. The Belminatis is a mountainous district, in which the Eurotas takes its rise from many springs. Belemina is said by Pausanias to have been 100 stadia from Pellana.

Its site is located near the modern Chelmos.
