= Harry Agganis =

American football and baseball player (1929–1955)

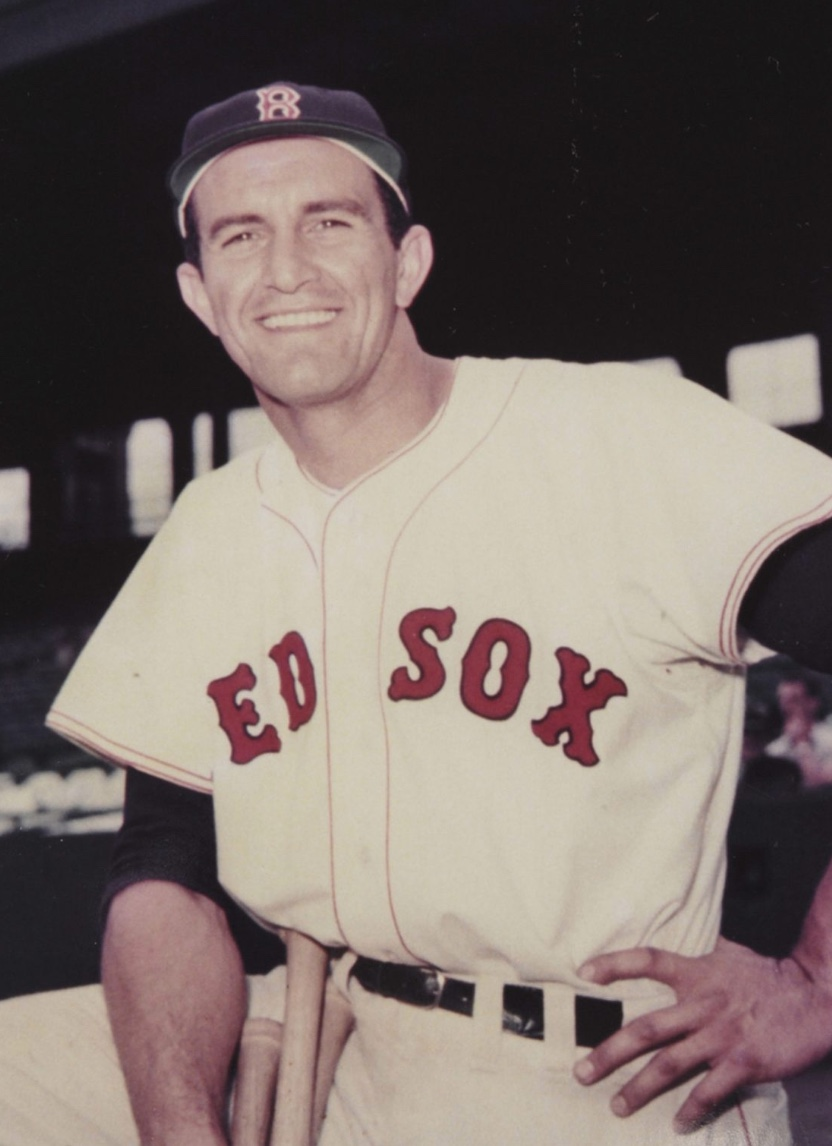
- Born: April 20, 1929; Lynn, Massachusetts, U.S.
- Died: June 27, 1955 (aged 26); Cambridge, Massachusetts, U.S.
- Baseball career
- First baseman
- Batted: Left Threw: Left

MLB debut
- April 13, 1954, for the Boston Red Sox

Last MLB appearance
- June 2, 1955, for the Boston Red Sox

MLB statistics
- Batting average: .261
- Hits: 135
- Home runs: 11
- Runs batted in: 67
- Stats at Baseball Reference

Teams
- Boston Red Sox (1954–1955)
- Football career

Profile
- Position: Quarterback

Career information
- College: Boston University
- NFL draft: 1952: 1st round, 12th overall pick

Career history
- 1949, 1951–1952: Boston University

Awards and highlights
- First-team All-American (1951); 2× First-team All-Eastern (1951, 1952); Boston University #33 retired
- College Football Hall of Fame (Class of 1974)

Aristotle George "Harry" Agganis (April 20, 1929 – June 27, 1955), nicknamed "the Golden Greek", was an American college football player and professional baseball player. After passing up a potential professional football career, he played in Major League Baseball as a first baseman from 1954 to 1955 for the Boston Red Sox.

Agganis first gained notice as a college football player at Boston University, becoming its first student named All-American. He passed up a professional career with the Cleveland Browns in order to play his favorite sport, baseball, close to his hometown. He signed a bonus baby contract, and after one season playing minor league baseball, he started at first base for the Red Sox.

In 1955, Agganis became gravely ill early in the season and was hospitalized for two weeks for pneumonia. He rejoined the Red Sox for a single week before being rehospitalized with a viral infection. After showing some signs of recovery, he died of a pulmonary embolism on June 27.

== Early life ==
Aristotle George Agganis (Greek: Αριστοτέλης Γεώργιος Αγγάνης) was born in Lynn, Massachusetts, growing up with four brothers and two sisters. His parents, George Agganis and Georgia Pappalimberis, were from Longanikos and married on October 14, 1906 in Ipswich, Massachusetts. His father briefly returned to Greece to enlist in the military to fight in the Balkan Wars, before his wife negotiated her husband's discharge after he was wounded in action. As a child, Agganis was called Aristo by his mother, which eventually became shortened to Ari, leading to the nickname Harry by childhood friends.

At age 14, Agganis played in a semi-pro league for the Lynn Frasers baseball team, hitting .342 in informal matches against major league players. Agganis was a star football and baseball player at Lynn Classical High School as well as a strong student, named "All-Scholastic". In December 1946, Agganis was quarterback for the Lynn Classical team that defeated Granby High School (quarterbacked by Chuck Stobbs) in the North–South Shrine Game at the Miami Orange Bowl.

== College career ==
Agganis enrolled at Boston University, where he became a starter, primarily at quarterback. After his sophomore season in 1949, when he set a school record by passing for 15 touchdowns, he entered the Marine Corps. Agganis played for the Camp Lejeune football and baseball teams in North Carolina. He received a dependency discharge from the Marines to support his mother and returned to college to play in 1951–52. Around the same time, Agganis was participating in summer baseball leagues in Augusta, Maine.

Agganis became the school's first All-American in football and Boston coach Buff Donelli named Agganis the "greatest football player he ever coached". He also played basketball and baseball at the school.

Agganis set another Boston University mark by passing for 1,402 yards for the season and won the Bulger Lowe Award as New England's outstanding football player. His number 33 was retired and he was inducted into the university's athletic hall of fame as soon as he graduated.

Coach Paul Brown of the Cleveland Browns thought Agganis could be the successor to Otto Graham and drafted the college junior in the first round of the 1952 NFL draft, offering him a bonus of $25,000 ($303,102 in 2025). Boston Red Sox owner Tom Yawkey outbid Brown, however, and signed Agganis to play major league baseball for the Red Sox as a first baseman for $35,000 ($424,342 in 2025). At the time of his death, Agganis was spending his off-season at his alma mater as an assistant coach, tutoring Tom Gastall, another quarterback who decided to play professional baseball and died young.

== Baseball career ==
Following his 1953 college graduation, Agganis played with the Triple-A Louisville Colonels, where he hit .281 with 23 home runs and 108 RBI. He made his major league debut on April 13, 1954. Agganis had a modest rookie season, although he did lead American League first basemen in assists and fielding percentage. He hit 11 home runs that year, with 57 RBI and a .251 batting average.

== Death ==
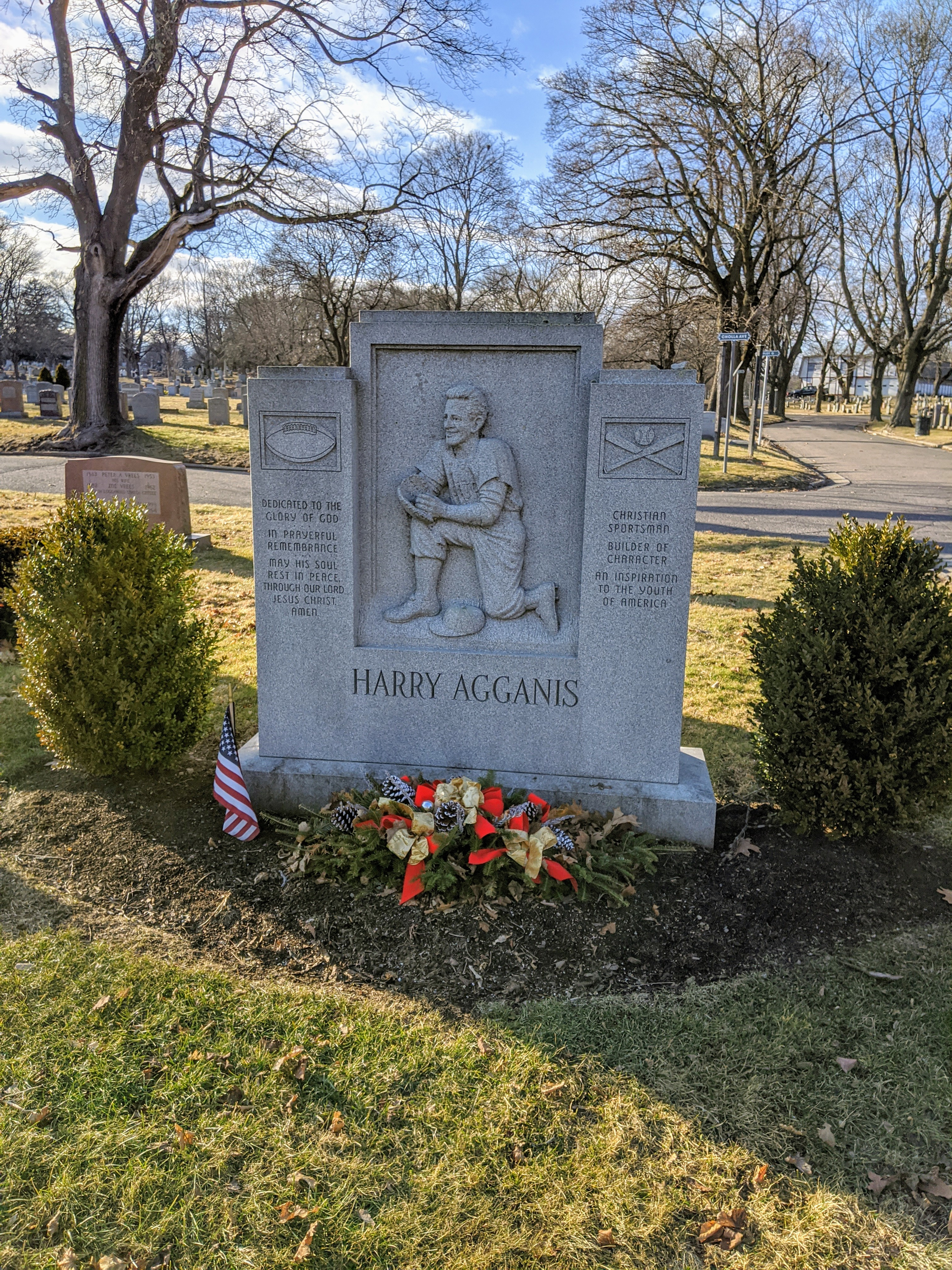
Agganis' grave in Pine Grove Cemetery in Lynn.

In May 1955, Agganis was hospitalized for 10 days with pneumonia, severe fever, and chest pains. He rejoined the Red Sox on June 1 and played two games against the Chicago White Sox, before falling ill again in Kansas City, Missouri, on June 5. He was diagnosed with a viral infection and flown back to Sancta Maria Hospital in Cambridge, Massachusetts, where a doctor partially blamed his playing too soon after the first illness. The Red Sox placed him on the voluntary retired list until he recuperated, an early version of the disabled list. He began showing signs of improvement, before a fatal pulmonary embolism on June 27.

Red Sox general manager Joe Cronin told the Associated Press that everyone related to the Red Sox organization was "grieved and shocked", calling Agganis "a grand boy", and saying the team would wear #6 black armbands to honor him. American League president Will Harridge said his office was "saddened and shocked", and Red Sox owner Tom Yawkey said he was "stunned", calling Agganis "a man of great character". Ten thousand mourners saw his body lie in state at St. George's Greek Orthodox Church in Lynn.

== Legacy ==
Agganis was inducted into the College Football Hall of Fame in 1974. Gaffney Street, near the former site of Braves Field in Boston, was renamed Harry Agganis Way in 1995.

Agganis Arena is a multipurpose sports facility at Boston University. The Harry Agganis Stadium located on Camp Lejeune was named in his honor.

The Agganis Foundation, founded in 1955 by Red Sox owner Tom Yawkey, the (Lynn) Daily Item, and Harold O. Zimman (a mentor of Agganis and the namesake of the Tufts Jumbos football field), has awarded more than $2.5 million in college scholarships to student-athletes who attend high school in Lynn and surrounding areas.

Actor Telly Savalas, in an episode of The Extraordinary, said he unknowingly met a ghost who said he knew a player from the Boston Red Sox, and the next day Savalas saw in the newspaper headlines that a 26-year-old player had died of mysterious circumstances.

== See also ==
- Boston University athletics
- List of baseball players who died during their careers
