= Pellana =

Pellana Πελλάνα
- Municipal unit
- Location within the regional unit

- Location within Greece
- Coordinates: 37°12′N 22°19′E
- Country: Greece
- Administrative region: Peloponnese
- Regional unit: Laconia
- Municipality: Sparti

Area
  - Municipal unit: 153.8 km^{2} (59.4 sq mi)
  - Community: 15.42 km^{2} (5.95 sq mi)
- Elevation: 355 m (1,165 ft)

Population (2021)
  - Municipal unit: 1,931
  - Municipal unit density: 12.56/km^{2} (32.52/sq mi)
  - Community: 263
  - Community density: 17.1/km^{2} (44.2/sq mi)
- Time zone: UTC+2 (EET)
  - Summer (DST): UTC+3 (EEST)
- Vehicle registration: AK

Pellana (/pəˈlænə/; Greek: ἡ Πέλλανα; τὰ Πέλλανα; Πελλήνη; Agis), was a city of ancient Lacedaemonia, on the Eurotas river, and on the road from Sparta to Arcadia.

Pellana is now a village and a municipal unit of the municipality of Sparti, Greece. It was a municipality until the 2011 local government reform. The municipal unit has an area of 153.763 km^{2}. The seat of the municipality was in Kastoreio. It was called Καλύβια Γεωργίτσι Kalivia Georgitsi (lit. the huts of Georgitsi) until it was renamed after a nearby ancient city in 1932.

Though the site of modern Pellana was clearly occupied in antiquity, it is probably not the site of the ancient Pellana mentioned by Pausanias and other ancient authors. The ancient Pellana was more likely near the modern Sellasia.

== History ==
According to archaeologist Theodore Spyropoulos, Pellana was the Mycenaean capital of Laconia. Today, Pellana is a small village in north Laconia, located 27 kilometers north of Sparta, 5 kilometers west of the main road that connects Sparta with Tripoli. It is built on a hill that is an extension of the Taygetos mountains in the Peloponessus. Pellana has an area of 15 square kilometers, and is 355 meters above sea level. The population of the modern village peaked in the 1940s, and has steadily declined, to the current population of 250.

The town suffered badly during the Second World War and the subsequent Greek Civil War.

There are ancient tombs about 400 meters from the main palace said to have housed King Menelaus and his wife Helen (of Troy).

== Transport ==
The highway from Tripoli to Sparta passes Pellana.

== Name ==
There are two possibilities about the origin of the name Pellana. Pellana has its roots in the Greek word pella, which can mean "stone" or a "rocky hill". Indeed, the main waterway in the village is at the base of a rocky hill. Pellana, linguistically, is a cognate of Pella, the capital of Macedonia but also of Pallene, a deme of Attica, Pelle of Ithaca, Pellene of Achaia, Palamedion, the acropolis of Nauplion, Pelion of Epirus, etc., all of them being "citadels on a cliff" or a hill, except for Pelion of Thessaly which is a mountain. According to modern oral folk tradition is that it received its name by a woman named “Pellania.” This woman was going to get some water; as she was getting water, she slipped and fell into the waterway. So, the village was named “Pellana”, and the main waterway: “Pellania fountain.”

It was said to have been the residence of Tyndareos, when he was expelled from Sparta, and was subsequently the frontier-fortress of Sparta on the Eurotas, as Sellasia was on the Oenus. Polybius describes it (iv. 81) as one of the cities of the Laconian Tripolis, the other two being probably Carystus (or, alternatively, Aegys) and Belemina. It had ceased to be a town in the time of Pausanias, but he noticed there a temple of Asclepius, and two fountains, named Pellanis and Lanceia.

Below Pellana, was the Characoma (Greek: Χαράκωμα), a fortification or wall in the narrow part of the valley; and near the town was the ditch, which according to the law of Agis, was to separate the lots of the Spartans from those of the Perioeci. (Plut. l. c.) Pausanias says that Pellana was 100 stadia from Belemina; but he does not specify its distance from Sparta, nor on which bank of the river it stood. It was probably on the left bank of the river at Mt. Burliá, which is distant 55 stadia from Sparta, and 100 from Mt. Khelmós, the site of Belemina. Mt. Burliá has two peaked summits, on each of which stands a chapel; and the bank of the river, which is only separated from the mountain by a narrow meadow, is supported for the length of 200 yards by a Hellenic wall. Some copious sources issue from the foot of the rocks, and from a stream which joins the river at the southern end of the meadow, where the wall ends. There are still traces of an aqueduct, which appears to have carried the waters of these fountains to Sparta. The acropolis of Pellana may have occupied one of the summits of the mountain, but there are no traces of antiquity in either of the chapels. (Leake, Morea, vol. iii. p. 13, seq.; Boblaye, Récherches, &c. p. 76; Ross, Reisen im Peloponnes, p. 191; Curtius, Peloponnesos, vol. ii. p. 255.)
