= Evrotas (river) =

Greek river

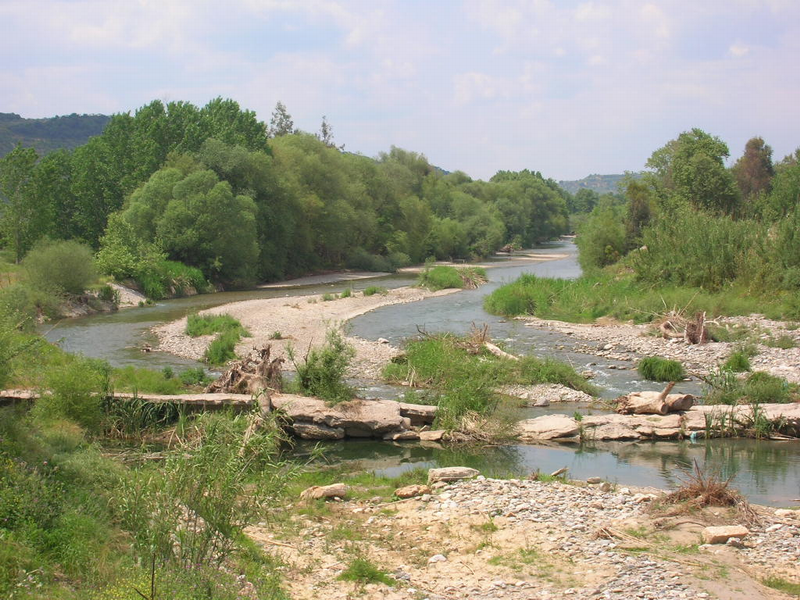
- The Evrotas, outside modern Sparta.

Location
- Country: Greece
- Regions: Laconia and Arcadia

Physical characteristics
- Source
  - location: Arcadian Nappe, Peloponnese
  - elevation: 430 m (1,410 ft)
- Mouth
  - location: Laconian Gulf
  - coordinates: 36°48′15″N 22°41′45″E
  - elevation: 0 m (0 ft)
- Length: 82 km (51 mi)
- Basin size: 2,239 km^{2} (864 sq mi)

Basin features
- Tributaries
  - left: Oenus, Xerias
  - right: Vathyrema (with Kastaniotiko, Vresiotiko, Kardaris), Voutikiotis, Rasina (with Gerakaris), Kakorema, Kerasiotiko, Kotitsanis, Magoulitsa, Mylopotamos, Nikova, Kserilas, Paroritis, Verias, Skatias, Tzitziniotiko, Tyflo, Fteroti

The Evrotas (Modern Greek: Ευρώτας) or Eurotas (Ancient Greek: Εὐρώτας) is the main river of Laconia and one of the major rivers of the Peloponnese, in Greece. The river's springs are located just northwest of the border between Laconia and Arcadia, at Skortsinos. The river is also fed by underwater springs at Pellana and by tributaries coursing down from Mt Taygetos and Mt Parnon, which flank the Evrotas Valley to the west and east respectively. The river is 82 kilometres (51 mi) long, flowing in a north-south direction and emptying into the Laconian Gulf. Its drainage basin is 2,239 km^{2} (864 sq mi).

== Etymology ==
One etymology derives the word Eurōtas from the ancient Greek eurōs (εὐρώς), "mold". The adjective eurōeis "moldy," is genuinely ancient, used as an epithet of Hades in Homer, but is in the Ionic rather than Doric dialect.

The name of the river has changed more than once. Names attested in early times include the Bomycas and the Himeras, later Evrotas, changing to Iri in the Middle Ages (and back to Evrotas in recent times).

The name Evrotas does not appear in the works of Homer, which purport to recount the stories and geography of Mycenaean Greece. (In that legendary time the Dorians are not known to have been present in the Evrotas Valley.)

== Geography ==
=== Physical ===
==== Sources ====
The source of the Evrotas River is a surface spring called Piges Evrota (Πηγές Ευρώτα, "Eurotas Springs") near the village of Skortsinos, Arcadia, by the side of the road ascending from Kyparissi. The spring is an outlet of an aquifer in the adjacent limestone ridge at a locale called Kephalari. The ridge, a karst, is not part of the Taygetus Massif but, like the other mountains of Arcadia, is a nappe raised by the compressional forces on the Hellenic Plate by the subduction of Africa. The spring is also called Logaras Spring.

Logaras Spring supplies an anciently constructed catchment basin about the size of a pond, sometimes called a lake, which exits both to irrigation channels and to the Alpheios stream (not to be confused with the Alpheios river in the northwestern Peloponnese). The flow is copious except in times of drought. A recent study measured the outflow through the catchment exit every 15 days for 540 days in 2006-2007. It recorded a maximum of 1748 cubic m per hour and a minimum of 310.5 cubic m per hour. From the catchment at an altitude of 430 m (1,410 ft) part of the water flows into the Alpheios stream, which enters the upper Eurotas.

The Laconian Alpheios stream is unconnected with the Alpheios river in Arcadia. The identity of their names comes from an ancient geologic misunderstanding that the Eurotas and the Apheios were connected underground, which deceived even Pausanias, one of the best ancient geographers. He believed they had the same source but that the outflow stream disappeared into a chasm only to emerge at different locations as different streams. In the most exaggerated form of the myth, the Alpheios continues under the Mediterranean to Sicily or elsewhere.

==== Main stream ====
Today the river is hydromorphologically far from its natural state. The main problem is anthropogenic abstraction of water, by many methods, from the shallow aquifer through which it flows. The valley contains about 7000 wells. Water is removed direct by irrigation ditches, weirs and pumping stations. Consequently the river is intermittent: large sections are typically dry of surface water even though water still flows in the aquifers. Flash flooding is a problem. Through flood control, the riverbed has been widened in places and straightened, and the vegetation has been removed from its sides. The lower river runs between dikes in a long, straight course.

==== Tributaries ====
Most of the numerous tributaries of the Eurotas are right-bank, feeding the shallow aquifer. They are, however, intermittent and ephemeral. The major ones have cut deep ravines into the Taygetus Massif. The few left-bank tributaries, receiving waters from the deep aquifer, are more substantial, but still intermittent.

The classical Oineus was changed to Kelefina in the Middle Ages and not restored to its ancient name until recent times. The current Magoulitsa was formerly the Trypiotiko.

==== Delta ====
The rich alluvial soil through which the final 10 km of the Eurotas flows was not there in antiquity. The Eurotas has aggraded the innermost bay of the gulf. The old coastline can be approximated by a line on the periphery of the plain of Elos marking the border within which prehistoric archaeological sites are not found. The line on the west follows the Skala-Gytheion road to Skala, the Skala-Molaoi road to Vlachiotis, southeast along the edge of the rising terrain to Asteri and south from there to the coast. Due to changes in sea level, some land on the flanks of the gulf has been drowned.

The current communities of Elos, Leimonas and Agioi Taxiarches have been constructed on aggraded land. As Pausanias mentions that Elos was a port city, the current Elos cannot be identified with it. Skala, on the other hand, means "place of embarkation." The location of the ancient port, however, is not yet known for certain.

=== Political ===
==== Legendary pre-Hellenic tribe ====
In Greek legend the human ancestor of all the peoples who inhabited the Eurotas Valley was Lelex, eponymous king of the Leleges, one of the peoples of the eastern Aegean whom the classical writers saw as autochthonous; that is, indigenous and pre-Hellenic. His son or grandson was Eurotas, the last of the line. The latter had a daughter, Sparta, but no sons. An outsider married her, Lacedaemon. Although he named the state Sparta after her, his name is now known to have most likely been the name of the Mycenaean state.

Mycenaean, or late Bronze Age Greece is known as Achaean Greek based on the Linear B and Hittite documents. The Dorians who were present were not overtly recorded by the surviving administrative records but by surviving copies of records. Hypothetically, if the Leleges really were in the Eurotas valley, the time of their ascendancy would have been before Mycenaean times.

Until the late 20th century, evidence in the valley of earlier occupation seemed to be lacking. Beginning in 1968 the University of Cambridge began a survey by underwater archaeology of a drowned town between Pounta on the mainland and Elafonisos island on the eastern side of the Laconian Gulf. The town extended over the entire drowned isthmus from 60 rock-cut tombs on the Pounta shore (a beach) to the remains of walls on Pavlopetri island off Elafonisos. A subsequent survey in 2009 discovered even earlier parts of the town and recovered additional pottery. A chronological study was done on "442 ceramic items, an iron nail and an obsidian chip." More research on the site is planned.

The town was apparently continuously occupied from the late Neolithic to Byzantine times when it was drowned, perhaps by an earthquake. Neolithic ceramics were only 3% of the 444 items. The town was mainly Early Bronze Age, which had 40%. The early Helladic pottery is "standard ... some showing close links with the Cyclades, western Crete and the northeastern Aegean." The "15% Middle Bronze Age" is represented by middle Helladic and middle Minoan. This archaeological scenario is not incompatible with the Aegean distribution of the Leleges, although it is not possible to say who the early and middle Bronze Age inhabitants were.

The late Bronze Age had 25% of the items. Classical and Byzantine items were minimal, indicating a probable near abandonment of the city at the end of the late Bronze Age.

==== Mycenaean Lacedaemon ====
Archaeology has provided a more complete story for the Mycenaean period. On the left bank of the Eurotas, across from Sparta, is a ridge on which sits a temple called the Menelaon. In the 20th century a survey by the British School of Archaeology revealed that the entire ridge, located in the municipal unit of Therapnes, ancient Therapnē, had been covered by a walled Mycenaean town, dated to the late Bronze Age by the late Helladic (LH3) pottery with some middle Helladic (MH) pottery in "pockets in the bedrock." The archaeologists analyzing the site recognized a building Period I, dated between LH2B–LH3A1, the latter being brought to an end about 1425 BCE by a severe earthquake. Remains of a mansion with Minoan pottery date from Period I.

During Period IA the hill settlement was rebuilt. The structures included kilns for smelting bronze. In Period II, dated to LH3A1, a villa-type structure was built on a terrace formed from previous building material further down to the south. It was probably two-storey, megaron-type, with "less substantial walls" but "a massive foundation for what could be a defense tower." It was connected to the top by stairs. Period III, LH3A2–LH3B2, begins with 150 years of apparent abandonment and then a limited reconstruction of a one-storey structure on the terrace. The staircase was blocked. The entire ridge was intensely occupied, leaving a profusion of Mycenaean pottery. The villa was burned at the end of LH3B2, leaving a destruction level. Two persons buried in the associated rubble appear to have died violently. Occupation of the hill went on through the Greek Dark Age, reduced to the Menelaon shrine in the Archaic and Classical Periods. Dedications to Menelaus and Helen are found in its vicinity starting the Archaic period.

The excavators concluded that in the "later 15th century" (BC) the ridge was "the principal settlement site in Laconia." The shrine and its dedications identify it as the site of Homeric Sparta, capital of a ruling couple believed by the population of the Archaic Period to have been Menelaos and Helen.

==== Classical Sparta ====
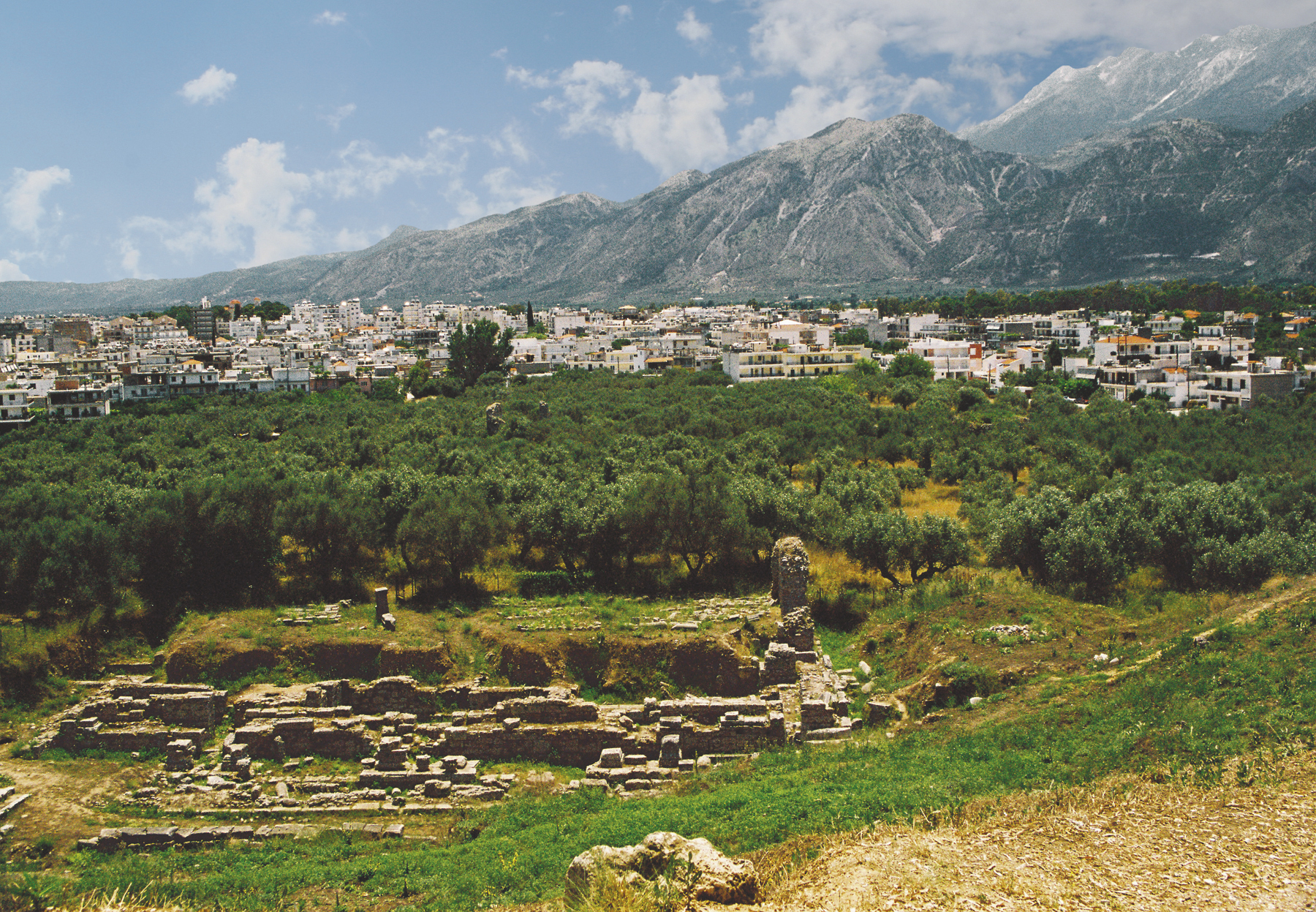
The ruins of the ancient Theatre of Sparta. In the background, the modern town with Mount Taygetus.

The classical-era city of Sparta was built on the west bank of the Eurotas about halfway down the valley. The Spartans made little use of the left bank of the river: Only one permanent bridge has been found that crossed to it, at Therapne just south of the city. The main traffic was southward to the port of Gytheio, which was the most convenient outlet. All others involved a trek over mountains.

==== Post-classical Laconia ====
Modern Laconia is a political subdivision of Greece covering the Evrotas Valley, the massifs on either side, the two headlands, and the enclosed Laconian Gulf with its coastal islands. Its seat is the city of Sparta, as in ancient times, at a site which dominated and still dominates the valley from its central position. However, the rich-soil plain is entirely divided into villages that practice agriculture, viticulture, and arboriculture intensely.

The main roads from Sparta form a branching network leading out radially from the city to connect other cities and towns in the valley. A web of secondary roads fills in the spaces between the main roads.

== Climate ==
The Evrotas Valley enjoys a sunny and warm Mediterranean climate (Köppen: Csa). The interior of the valley records the highest summer mean maximum temperatures in Greece and is comparable to areas of Andalusia in terms of summer average highs. This is due to the interior's geographical location between Taygetus and Parnon mountains, completely cut out from the sea on all directions, some 30 km away from the shores. As the meltemi winds sweep Greece during the summer, both mountains provide a constant hot foehn winds effect which strongly affects the interior of the valley.

During July 2023 the Hydro Meteorological station of the National Observatory of Athens in Evrotas registered a record mean maximum temperature of 42.3°C. On August 3, 2021 the Evrotas station recorded 47.4°C. On average this station records 43 days annually with temperatures over 40.0°C. On July 30, 2021 the Kelefina Hydro Meteorological station of the National Observatory of Athens recorded 47.1°C.

In July 2023 the World Meteorological Organization station in Gytheio registered 46.4°C, the highest temperature ever recorded in the National Observatory of Athens fan-aspirated stations network.

Climate data for Evrotas (National Observatory of Athens) 224 m a.s.l, (2020–2024)
Month	Jan	Feb	Mar	Apr	May	Jun	Jul	Aug	Sep	Oct	Nov	Dec	Year
Record high °C (°F)	25.4 (77.7)	28.7 (83.7)	32.5 (90.5)	36.5 (97.7)	42.8 (109.0)	46.6 (115.9)	47.0 (116.6)	47.4 (117.3)	42.1 (107.8)	39.6 (103.3)	34.5 (94.1)	27.6 (81.7)	47.4 (117.3)
Mean daily maximum °C (°F)	17.4 (63.3)	19.2 (66.6)	20.5 (68.9)	26.3 (79.3)	31.8 (89.2)	37.1 (98.8)	40.7 (105.3)	39.8 (103.6)	35.4 (95.7)	30.2 (86.4)	24.0 (75.2)	19.1 (66.4)	28.5 (83.2)
Daily mean °C (°F)	10.1 (50.2)	11.1 (52.0)	12.3 (54.1)	16.8 (62.2)	21.4 (70.5)	26.3 (79.3)	29.5 (85.1)	29.0 (84.2)	25.3 (77.5)	20.6 (69.1)	15.9 (60.6)	12.1 (53.8)	19.2 (66.6)
Mean daily minimum °C (°F)	2.8 (37.0)	2.9 (37.2)	4.1 (39.4)	7.3 (45.1)	11.0 (51.8)	15.6 (60.1)	18.3 (64.9)	18.1 (64.6)	15.1 (59.2)	11.1 (52.0)	7.7 (45.9)	5.1 (41.2)	9.9 (49.9)
Record low °C (°F)	−6.5 (20.3)	−5.1 (22.8)	−2.5 (27.5)	−1.0 (30.2)	5.8 (42.4)	9.3 (48.7)	12.7 (54.9)	15.0 (59.0)	8.0 (46.4)	5.8 (42.4)	−0.5 (31.1)	−2.6 (27.3)	−6.5 (20.3)
Average rainfall mm (inches)	101.2 (3.98)	38.2 (1.50)	56.4 (2.22)	27.8 (1.09)	21.6 (0.85)	34.9 (1.37)	10.2 (0.40)	25.1 (0.99)	39.3 (1.55)	64.6 (2.54)	98.9 (3.89)	96.3 (3.79)	614.5 (24.17)
Source 1: Hydro Meteorological station of Evrotas, National Observatory of Athens (Mar 2020 - Jul 2024)
Source 2: Precipitation from Sparta N.O.A station

== Ecology ==
In modern times, much of the river water is used for irrigation, with the result that the Eurotas is almost dry during the summer months. The waters of the Eurotas are used to irrigate mainly citrus crops, for which Laconia is famous. The plain of Elos near the mouth of the river is particularly fertile farmland.

In the winter months the Evrotas is prone to flooding. On 24 November 2005 heavy floods damaged buildings, stranded automobiles in the streets and harmed orchards, including the valley's famous orange and olive groves. The floods affected many villages along the valley as well as the town of Gytheio; 170 km^{2} (66 mi^{2}) of land was ruined.

Currently the nitrate waste from fertilizers is polluting the river, aggravated by diminished flow because of the irrigation demands on it.

== Geology ==
=== Geomorphology ===
The Evrotas River occupies the floor of a rift valley, or graben, created by extensional forces acting over the Hellenic Plate in a northeast-southwest direction. The corresponding fault-block mountains are the Taygetus Massif on the west and the Parnon Massif on the east – both limestone ridges derived from a former sea bed. On the east side of Taygetus is the Sparta Fault, a normal fault, which strikes in a zig-zag path along the foot of the massif and dips toward the interior of the valley. The river is on the western side. From it the scarps of the footwall of the Sparta Fault are visible at the base of Tayegetus.

Taygetus is transected by deep ravines through which tributaries flow into the Eurotas. At the foot of the massif is a zone of scree. To the east of that alluvial fans from Taygetus cover half the valley, making it asymmetrical. On that account it is often called the Evrotas Furrow. The Evrotas flows over a flood plain and also through a shallow aquifer of sand and gravel 10–60 m deep, graded with the deep end downstream. The gradient of the aquifer is a steep 1–3%. The highest hydraulic conductivity and transmissivity are near the junction of the Xerias and the Evrotas south of Sparti. To the east are older and finer sediments of alternating clay and marl beds, some of which are impermeable. Under the entire valley is a deep aquifer in the limestone floor, containing water permeating downward through the horsts. The Evrotas collects runoff and drains the deep aquifer on the east bank but loses water to the shallow aquifer on the west bank.

=== Recent geologic history ===
Analysis of bore holes in the valley indicate that in the Pliocene it was a lake. In classical times, according to the ancient authors, it was swampy, but the cultivatable land exposed was very fertile. Then, as now, it was used mainly for fruit trees, especially olive.

Geologic analysis done in the 20th century hypothesized that the Evrotas Valley in the Late Pliocene was an inland sea over the lower and middle valley several hundred m deep at the current mouth of the river. The fault-block geology had developed earlier. During the Pleistocene the sea level dropped 500 m (1,600 ft) exposing a flat floor. Continued slippage along the Sparta Fault dropped the middle Eurotas valley further forcing the river to cut its way through the 100–250 m hills dividing the lower from the middle valley, creating Evrotas Ravine.
