= Epidavros Limira =

Coordinates: 36.6750°N 22.9573°E

Epidavros Limira Province Επαρχία Επιδαύρου Λιμηράς
- Province of Greece
- 2006
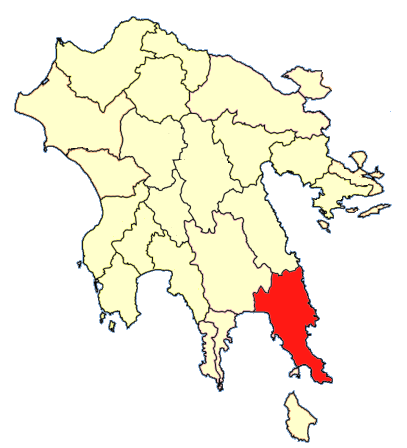
- Capital: Molaoi

Epidavros Limira was one of the provinces of the Laconia Prefecture, Greece. It was named after the ancient city Epidaurus Limera. Its territory corresponded with that of the current municipalities Elafonisos and Monemvasia, and the municipal units Elos and Niata. It was abolished in 2006.
