= Side (Laconia) =

Coordinates: 36°28′41″N 23°08′41″E

Side (Ancient Greek: Σίδη) was a town on the eastern coast of ancient Laconia, a little north of the promontory Malea. It was said to have existed before the Dorian conquest, and to have derived its name from a daughter of Danaus. The inhabitants were removed by the Dorian conquerors to the neighbouring town of Boeae.

The location of Side is tentatively identified as near modern Velanidia.
