= Boeae =

Town in the south of ancient Laconia

Coordinates: 36°30′44″N 23°03′36″E

Boeae or Boiai (Ancient Greek: Βοιαί), also known as Boea or Boia (Βοία), was a town in the south of ancient Laconia, situated between the promontories Malea and Onugnathos, in the bay called after it Boeatic Gulf (Βοιατικὸς κόλπος). The town is said to have been founded by Boeus, one of the Heraclidae, who led thither colonists from the neighbouring towns of Etis, Aphrodisias, and Side. It afterwards belonged to the Eleuthero-Lacones, and was visited by Pausanias, who mentions a temple of Apollo in the forum, and temples of Aesculapius and of Sarapis and Isis elsewhere. At the distance of seven stadia from the town there were ruins of a temple of Aesculapius and Hygieia.

Its site is located near the modern Neapoli Voion.
