= Kastania Cave =

Cave in Lakonia, Greece

Coordinates: 36.545957°N 23.124729°E

Kastania Cave at Vatika region, prefecture of Lakonia. About 11 kilometers from Neapoli Voion.

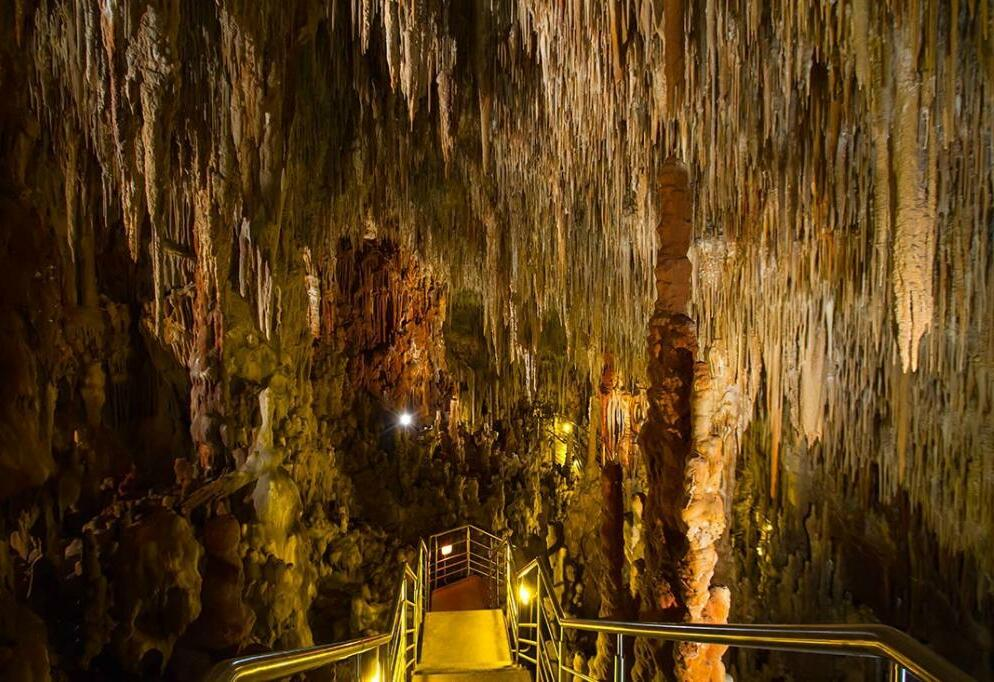
Kastania Cave

Further info at official tourist municipality page and local tourist guide.
