= Velanidia, Laconia =

Velanidia Βελανίδια
- Community
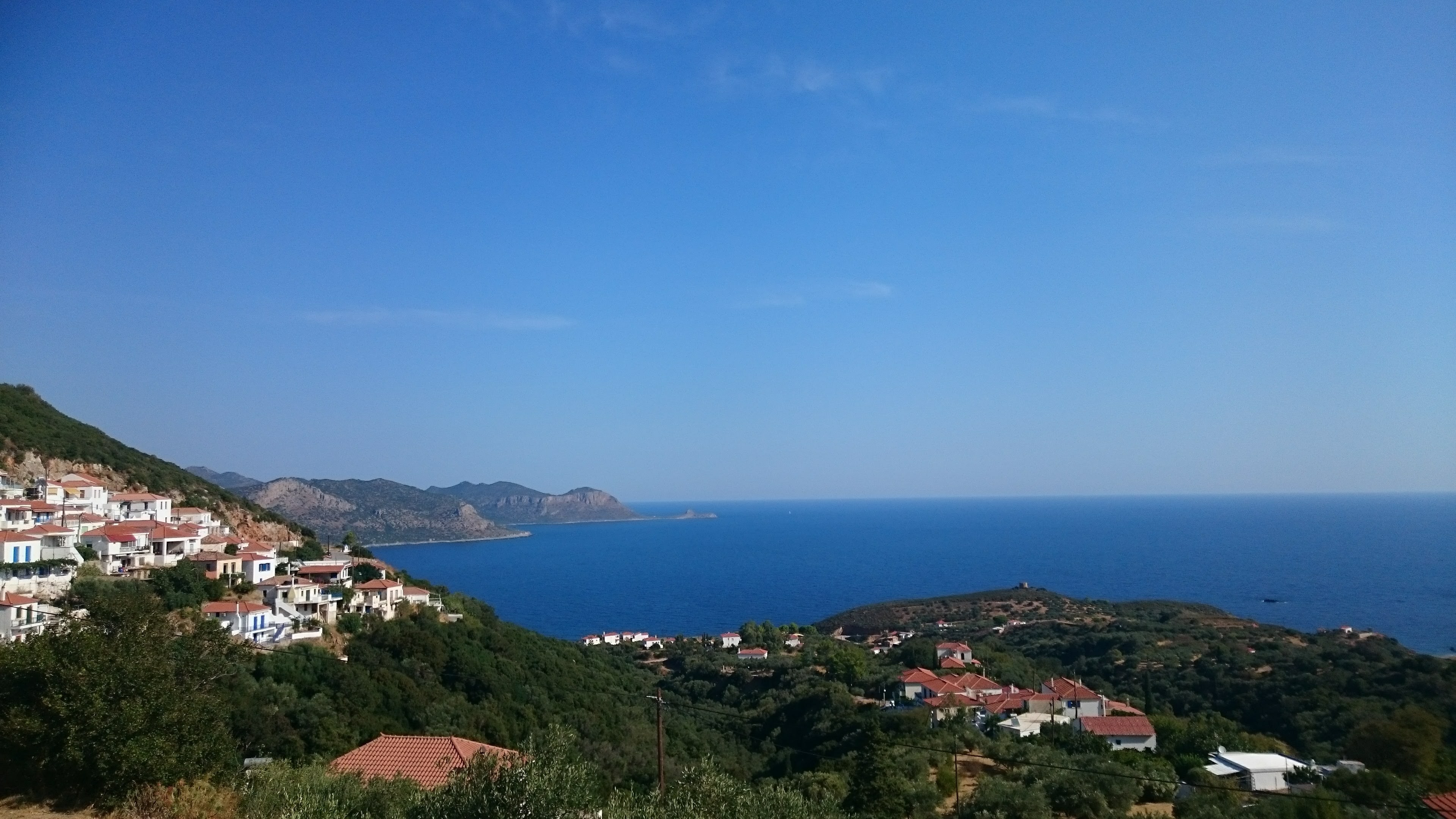

- Location within Greece
- Coordinates: 36°28′41″N 23°08′46″E
- Country: Greece
- Administrative region: Peloponnese
- Regional unit: Laconia
- Municipality: Monemvasia
- Municipal unit: Voies

Population (2021)
  - Community: 368
- Time zone: UTC+2 (EET)
  - Summer (DST): UTC+3 (EEST)
- Postal code: 230 53
- Vehicle registration: AK

Velanidia (Greek: Βελανίδια) is a village and a community in Laconia, Greece, within the municipality of Monemvasia. It is situated at the southern edge of Peloponnese at the southeast edge of mountain range Parnon. It includes several Byzantine churches, giving it the nickname Small Agios Oros. This village is near Cape Maleas. Population 368 (2021).

== History ==
Velanidia is a Byzantine village. Established in 1718, this settlement was possibly a result of a unification of several smaller settlements, because of the need of a more organized community.

Due to some debris found near to Church Saint Greek: Άγιος Panteleimon, it is believed that the residents left that area and moved to the current location of the village circa 1770. At this point, residents from Spetses came to live at Velanidia because of Orlofika.

The unification of these two settlements resulted in Velanidia. The architecture of the village was influenced by the architecture of islands, because of the small, white houses and by the marine growth. Most people born in Velanidia have a job in marine work, such as captains, ship mechanics, and fishermen.

According to archaeologist Frederick William Hasluck, this region was previously called Sidi and was situated at the mountain range of Saint Greek: Άγιος George, which is east of Cape Maleas.

=== City of Sidi ===
This former city, which was situated in the same place as modern Velanidia, is said that its name was from the daughter of Danaos, king of Carystos, Evia, who came from the region of Maleas in order to be protected from Hera goddess. According to Pausanias, there were two sanctuaries near Cape Maleas, one dedicated to the god Poseidon at the west side, and the other at the east side, to Apollo.

=== Small Agio Oros ===
This place was chosen from several, important people related with the Christian (Orthodox) religion, such as Saint George and Saint Thomas from Malea, in order to live in a Monastery near to God (Father of Jesus based on Christianity). In June 1829, French colonel Vincent, returning from Velanidia, said: "It looks like a paint from Van Dyke. Full of lights and behind of it dark clouds. Dressed with shreds and placed at the light come from the rise. I could see him with the diopter looking at the sun and wave to him.."

This region was famous as Small Agio Oros because of its several churches created during the 12th and 13th century.

=== German Observatory of the Second World War ===
A complex of military buildings were built in 1942 by Germany in order to have the supervision of the Balkan and Aegean Sea. Its placement was strategic for checking the navigation of ships on the Aegean Sea and generally what it is moved at the southern part of Peloponnese, Crete, etc. This complex has three main parts: the (A) building, the (B) building (which had the electromechanical installations), the WC building (C), one big, external water tank west of (A) building, a furnace (which was possibly for amiant creation due to the erection of the buildings), and 4 orthogonal structures, east of (A) building, looking at the sea (their purpose is unknown). West of the complex are at least 2 circular structures, which were possibly used as a watchtower in order to monitor the direction towards Neapoli. Some materials were transferred from Piraeus by ship, and the compulsive work of local residents. This building was opted not to be a military building, but an observatory. This assumption was confirmed by many local residents, who had seen the transportation of power generators and lengthy copper wires. These structures made this complex ideal for military use.

== Geography ==
The landscape of Velanidia was created by geological actions from the past, on the rocky place inside the cave of Saint Greek: Άγιος John. Nearby, there are ruins from the 5th to 15th century, which was used for protection. A stream starts from the mountain of Saint John which has several trees and flowers that lead to the sea and specifically to Gialos beach. At the top of the mountain there is a German building from the Second World War, which is named "Ergo", and used as an observatory.

== Churches ==
- Panagia "Myrtidiotissa"
- Assumption of Mary
- Saint John
- Saint Panteleimon
- Saint George
- Saint Paul
- Saints Constantine and Helen
- Saint Myron
- Panagia "Elona"
- Saint Thomas from Malea
- Saint Dominique

Velanidia is distinct because of its Byzantine churches. Churches like those of Saint Constantine, Saint Panteleimon, and Saint John have several wall paintings where visitors can observe the fidelity of figures.

== Beaches ==
- Gialos
- Saint George
- Saint Paul
- Kalevolos
