= Eurotas =

Eurotas may refer to:

- Eurotas (mythology)

== Places ==
- Evrotas (municipality), a municipality of southern Greece
- Eurotas (river), the main river of Laconia in southern Greece
- Another name of the Titarisios, a river of Thessaly, Greece

== Ships ==
- HMS Eurotas, two ships of the Royal Navy
- Evrotas, a ship of the Hellenic Navy
- Eurotas, a clasp of the Naval General Service Medal (British)

== Science ==
- Eurota, a genus of moths
- Telicota eurotas, a species of butterfly
- Eurota Chasmata, a quadrangle on Saturn's moon Dione
- Eurotas, a canal of Mars
