= Kremasti, Laconia =

Kremasti Κρεμαστή
- Community
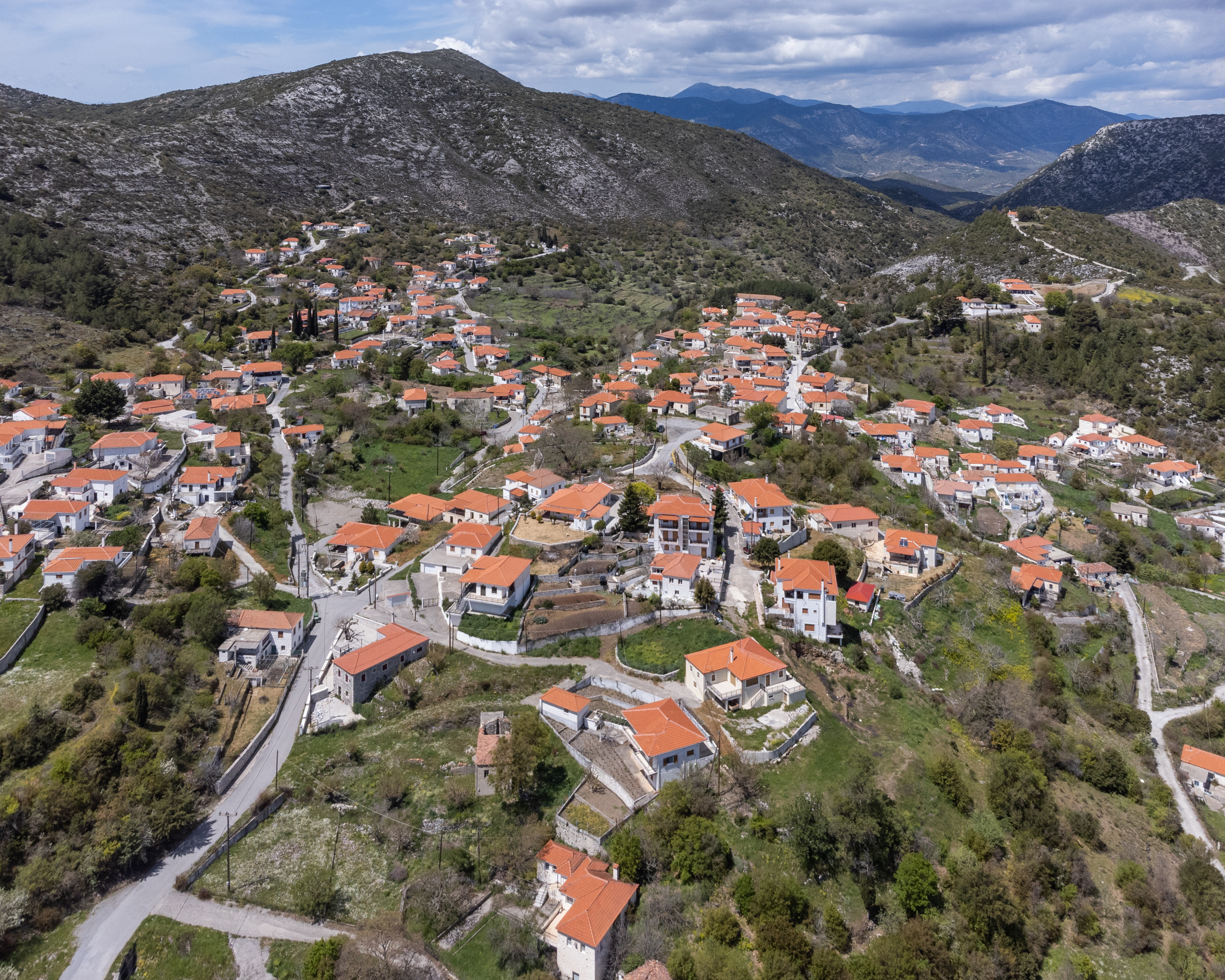
- Airview of Kremasti

- Location within Greece
- Coordinates: 36°58.7′N 22°52.4′E
- Country: Greece
- Administrative region: Peloponnese
- Regional unit: Laconia
- Municipality: Evrotas
- Municipal unit: Niata
- Elevation: 800 m (2,600 ft)

Population (2021)
  - Community: 180
- Time zone: UTC+2 (EET)
  - Summer (DST): UTC+3 (EEST)
- Postal code: 230 52
- Area code: 27320

Kremasti (Greek: Κρεμαστή) is a village in Laconia, southern Greece. Located in the Parnon mountain range, it is 800 m above sea level. It is part of the municipal unit of Niata.

Kremasti's name derives from the Greek word "kremasto," which translates to "hung" or "suspended," since the village looks as if it is suspended from the surrounding mountains.
