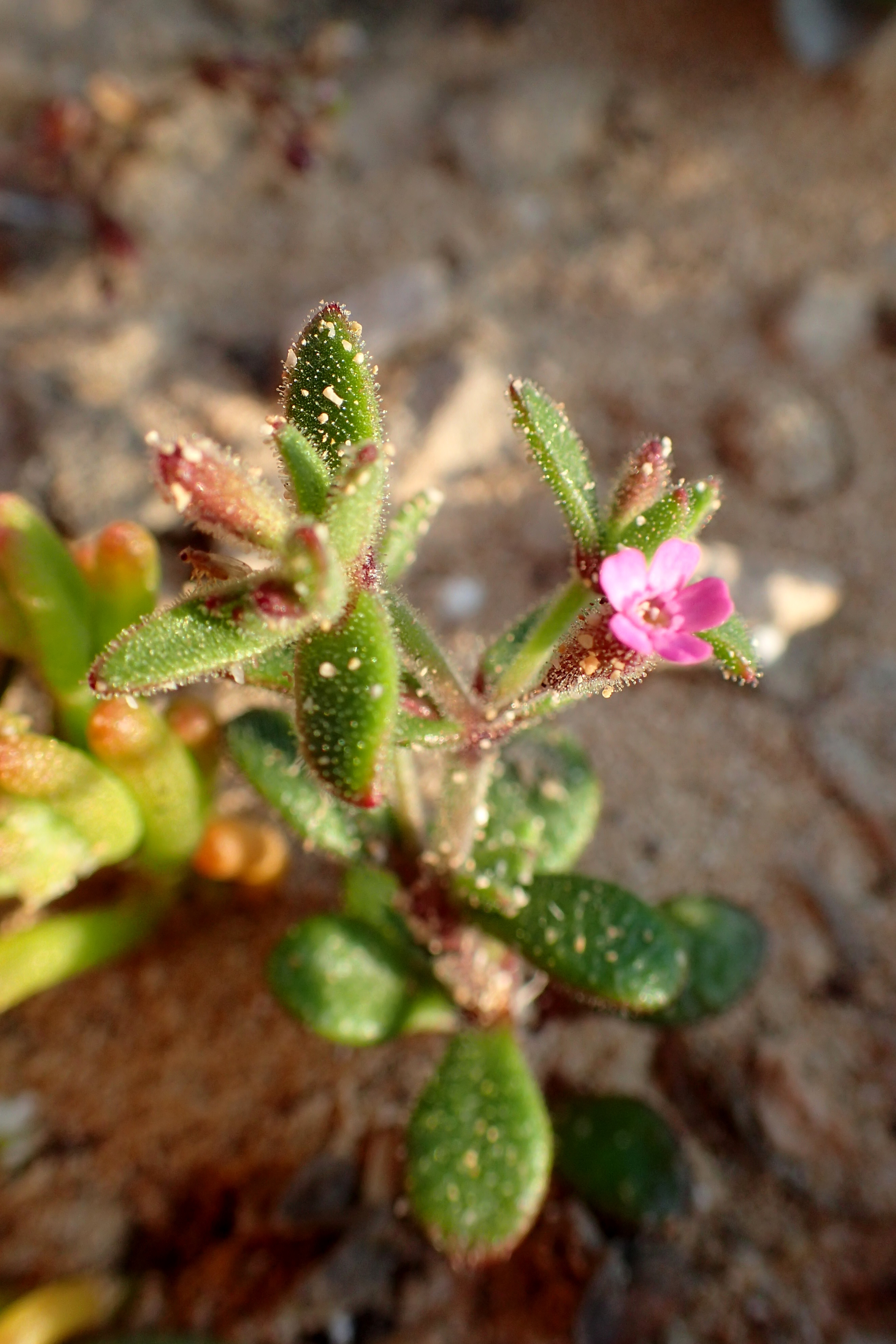

Scientific classification
- Kingdom: Plantae
- Clade: Tracheophytes
- Clade: Angiosperms
- Clade: Eudicots
- Order: Caryophyllales
- Family: Caryophyllaceae
- Genus: Silene
- Species: S. sedoides

Binomial name
- Silene sedoides Poir.

= Silene sedoides =

Species of flowering plant

Silene sedoides is a species of flowering plant belonging to the carnation family (Caryophyllaceae). It is found primarily along rocky and sandy coastlines of the Mediterranean Sea. First documented in 1789 from specimens collected in North Africa, this short-lived annual plant grows in the harsh zone just above the high-tide line where few other plants survive. It is characterised by its fleshy, somewhat succulent leaves that help it conserve water in its dry, salty habitat, and by its small white to pink flowers that feature a distinctive dark spot at the base of each petal. The plant's leaves range from spoon-shaped to egg-shaped, and its entire surface is covered with sticky, glandular hairs that may help protect it from the intense Mediterranean sun and sea spray. While most abundant in Greece, Silene sedoides can be found scattered along coastlines from Spain and France in the west to Turkey, Cyprus, and parts of the Middle East in the east. Scientists recognise two different subspecies, with the less common one being found only in a small area of southern Greece.

== Description ==
Silene sedoides is an annual herb with ascending stems. The basal leaves, typically between 0.5 and 4 cm in length, are somewhat glabrous (almost hairless). Stem leaves range from spatulate (spoon-shaped) to narrowly obovate (egg-shaped and wider near the tip). The flowers grow in cymes (branched clusters), which initially branch equally but later often transition to one-sided branching (monochasia). The calyx (the outer floral envelope) is cylindrical during flowering, becoming slightly clavate (club-shaped) as fruit develops, measuring 5–8 mm in length. Petals are typically white to pink, often emarginate (with a small notch at the tip), and feature a distinctive dark spot at the base. The capsule is narrowly ovate, membranous, and measures at least twice as long as the supporting stalk (gonophore), which typically becomes swollen at maturity. Seeds are small (0.5–0.6 mm wide), rounded, and have smooth or slightly mamillate (bumpy) surfaces.

== Habitat and distribution ==
This species predominantly occupies rocky, sandy, or gravelly habitats in the maritime supralittoral zone (the area just above the high-tide line), occasionally appearing slightly inland as a ruderal (disturbed site) plant. Its distribution spans broadly around the Mediterranean, from Spain and France eastward through Italy, Greece, Turkey, Cyprus, and the Middle East, extending as far west as North Africa. Within Greece, it is common, growing in coastal environments. Elsewhere, its occurrences are more sporadic and less frequent.

== Taxonomy ==
Silene sedoides was first described by Jean Louis Marie Poiret in 1789, based on specimens collected in northern Africa (likely Tunisia or northeastern Algeria). Within this species, two subspecies are recognised:

- Silene sedoides subsp. sedoides – characterised by shorter petals (1–3 mm), cylindrical calyx during flowering, and predominantly white or pale pink petals. This subspecies is widespread and constitutes the majority of the species' populations.
- Silene sedoides subsp. runemarkii – described as a new subspecies from the southernmost region of Greece's Malea peninsula, distinguished by its deeper pink petals, obconical (inverted cone-shaped) calyx during flowering, and generally larger flower structures. This subspecies occupies a restricted geographic range.

The taxonomy of the species has undergone various revisions, incorporating previously separate varieties such as S. sedoides var. laxa, var. pachyphylla, and var. pallescens.
