= Agios Nikolaos, Voies =

Agios Nikolaos Άγιος Νικόλαος
- Community
- Location within Greece
- Coordinates: 36°28.5′N 23°6.2′E
- Country: Greece
- Administrative region: Peloponnese
- Regional unit: Laconia
- Municipality: Monemvasia
- Municipal unit: Voies
- Elevation: 200 m (660 ft)

Population (2021)
  - Community: 570
- Time zone: UTC+2 (EET)
  - Summer (DST): UTC+3 (EEST)
- Vehicle registration: AK

Agios Nikolaos is a village in Laconia, southern Greece, part of the municipality Monemvasia.

Its permanent population in 2021 was 570, although its population increases during the summer months. The original name of the village dating back in the 17th century was "Panagia" from a homonymous temple of Virgin Mary.

Most of the inhabitants trace their ancestry from the Western parts of Crete that was occupied by the Ottomans in 1669 resulting to a wide refugee influx in the Vatica area. Moreover, people from the island of Kythera started populating the village from the early 19th century and onwards.

Known families include "Nychas" family presumably indigenous since the 17th century, "Pavlakis" Cretan ancestry and "Michaletos" Venetian ancestry coming from Crete as well.

The village has a strong diaspora concentrated in Sydney, Australia and Pretoria, South Africa.

== See also ==
- List of settlements in Laconia
