= Etis =

Town in ancient Laconia, Greece

Coordinates: 36°29′20″N 23°03′58″E

Etis (Ancient Greek: Ἦτις) was a town in the south of ancient Laconia, the inhabitants of which were removed to Boeae. Its site is located near the modern Paleokastro.
