= Lacedaemon Province =

Lacedaemon Province Επαρχία Λακεδαίμονος
- Province of Greece
- 2006
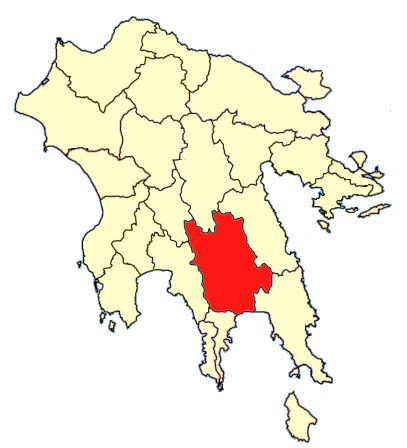
- Capital: Sparta

Lacedaemon Province was one of the provinces of Laconia Prefecture, Greece. Its territory corresponded with that of the current municipality Sparta and the municipal units Geronthres, Krokees, Skala and Sminos. It was abolished in 2006.
