= Aphrodisias (disambiguation) =

Aphrodisias (Ancient Greek: Ἀφροδισιάς) may refer to:

- Aphrodisias, a city in ancient Caria.
- Aphrodisias (planthopper), an insect
- Aphrodisias (Cilicia), a town of ancient Cilicia
- Aphrodisias (Cyprus), a city of ancient Cyprus
- Aphrodisias (Laconia), a town of ancient Laconia
- Aphrodisias (Thrace), a town of ancient Thrace
- Aphrodisias (island), an island at North Africa, with a temple of Aphrodite, mentioned by ancient Greek writers
- Aphrodisias, ancient name of Bozburun Peninsula in Turkey

== See also ==
- Aphrodisiac (disambiguation)
- Aphrodisia, festival of Aphrodite
