= Afrodisiac =

Afrodisiac may refer to:

- Afrodisiac (Fela Kuti album), 1971
- Afrodisiac (The Main Ingredient album), 1973
- Afrodisiac (comics), a Marvel Comics character
- Afrodisiac (Brandy album), 2004
- Afro-Disiac, album by Willy Chirino, 2001
- "Afrodisiac", a 1995 song by Powder
- "Afrodisiac" (song), a 2004 song by Brandy
- "Afrodisiac", album by The Veldt, 1994

== See also ==
- Aphrodisiac (disambiguation)
