= Aphrodisiac (disambiguation) =

An aphrodisiac is a substance which increases sexual desire.

Aphrodisiac may also refer to:

== Albums ==
- Aphrodisiac, an album by FM

== Songs ==
- "Aphrodisiac" (song), a song by Eleftheria Eleftheriou
- "Aphrodisiac", a song by Dennis Edwards
- "Aphrodisiac", a song by Bow Wow Wow from the album When the Going Gets Tough, the Tough Get Going
- "Aphrodisiac", a song by Amanda Lear from the album Secret Passion
- "Aphrodisiac", a song by Andre Williams
- "Aphrodisiac", a song by Jin Akanishi from the album Japonicana

== See also ==
- Aphrodisiac I and Aphrodisiac II, films by Hugh Parker Guiler
- Aphrodisias (disambiguation)
- Afrodisiac (disambiguation)
- Afrodisíaco, an album by Rauw Alejandro
