= Elos =

Elos Έλος
- Municipal unit
- Location within the regional unit

- Location within Greece
- Coordinates: 36°50′N 22°42′E
- Country: Greece
- Administrative region: Peloponnese
- Regional unit: Laconia
- Municipality: Evrotas

Area
  - Municipal unit: 117.6 km^{2} (45.4 sq mi)
- Elevation: 15 m (49 ft)

Population (2021)
  - Municipal unit: 5,240
  - Municipal unit density: 44.6/km^{2} (115/sq mi)
  - Community: 643
- Time zone: UTC+2 (EET)
  - Summer (DST): UTC+3 (EEST)
- Postal code: 230 55
- Area code: 27350
- Vehicle registration: ΑΚ

Elos (Greek: Έλος, before 1930: Δουραλί - Dourali) is a village and a former municipality in Laconia, Peloponnese, Greece. Since the 2011 local government reform it is part of the municipality Evrotas, of which it is a municipal unit. The municipal unit has an area of 117.577 km^{2}. It had its own primary school until 2012. The seat of the municipality of Evrotas is in Skala. The inhabitants work as farmers producing oranges and olive oil. The municipal unit has a coastline on the Laconian Gulf. The river Evrotas is west of Elos. The name dates back to ancient times. It is located west of Monemvasia, east of Gytheio and southeast of Sparta.

== Mythology ==
Pausanias mentions a seaside city near Sparta called Helos, whose inhabitants were enslaved and became the helots. Helos was founded by Heleus, the younger son of Perseus. The city was reduced by siege by the Dorians, and their inhabitants became the first slaves of the Lacedemonian state.

== Historical population ==
Year	Community	Municipal unit
1981	756	-
1991	824	5,992
2001	920	6,452
2011	742	5,718
2021	643	5,240

== See also ==
- List of settlements in Laconia
