= Pavlopetri =

Submerged ancient city in Greece

Coordinates: 36°30′58″N 22°59′17″E

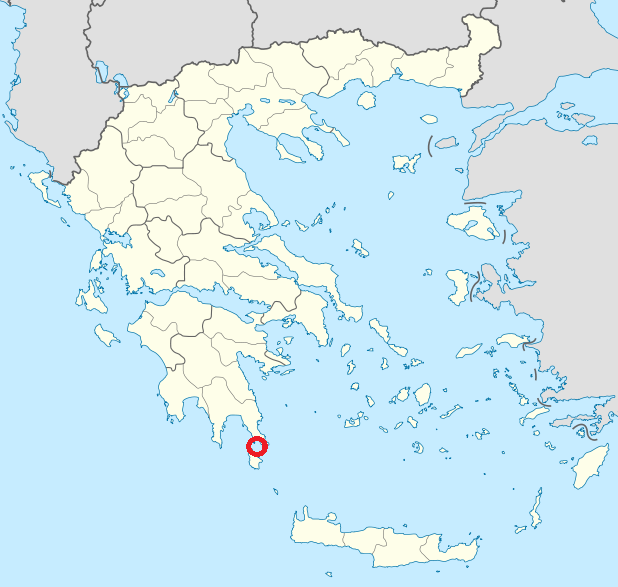
Position of Pavlopetri.

Pavlopetri (Greek: Παυλοπέτρι) is an archaeologial site in Vatika Bay, off the coast of southern Laconia in Peloponnese, Greece. It is about 5,000 years old, making it the oldest submerged city known in the world. Pavlopetri is unique in having an almost complete town plan, including streets, buildings, and tombs.

== Name ==
Pavlopetri (or Paulopetri) literally translates to Paul's stone and is a direct reference to St. Paul.

== Discovery and location ==
The existence of submerged walls at the site was first noted in 1904 by the geologist Fokion Negris but little was reported of their extent or state of preservation. It was then re-discovered in 1967 by Nicholas Flemming and mapped in 1968 by a team of archaeologists from Cambridge, the site is located between the islet of Pavlopetri and the Pounta coast of Laconia on the Peloponnese peninsula, northeast of the village on the island of Elafonisos. The archeological site as well as the islet and the surrounding sea area are within the region of the Elafonisos Municipality. In antiquity, Elafonisos was a peninsula known as Ὄνου Γνάθος (Onou Gnathos, meaning "donkey's jawbone") according to Pausanias. While Pavlopetri was inhabited, Elafonisos would have been connected to the Peloponnese by the means of Pavlopetri. Since then the sea level has risen and earthquakes have pushed the city down, making the gap between Elafonisos and Peloponnese larger. In Thucydides' "History of the Peloponnesian War", it is suggested that Elafonisos was connected to Peloponnese. There are also incisions on the north side of Elafonisos in the rock that were used for transporting goods with carts.

== Origins ==
Originally, the ruins were dated to the Mycenaean period, 1600–1100 BCE but later studies showed a much earlier occupation dating back to 3500 BCE, so it also includes artifacts from the Final Neolithic Age, Chalcolithic Age, Bronze Age, and middle Minoan and transitional material. It is now believed that the town was submerged around 1000 BCE by the first of three earthquakes that the area suffered. The area never re-emerged, so it was neither built-over nor disrupted by agriculture. Although eroded over the centuries, the town layout is as it was thousands of years ago. The site is under threat of damage by boats dragging anchors, as well as by tourists and souvenir hunters.

== Exploration ==
The fieldwork of 2009 was largely to map the site. It is the first submerged town digitally surveyed in three dimensions. Sonar mapping techniques developed by military and oil prospecting organizations have aided recent work. The city has at least 15 buildings submerged in 3 to 4 metres (9.8–13.1 ft) of water. The newest discoveries in 2009 alone cover 9,000 m^{2} (2.2 acres).

Four more fieldwork sessions were planned in October 2009, in collaboration with the Greek government as a joint project aimed at excavations. Also working alongside the archaeologists (from the University of Nottingham) are a team from the Australian Centre for Field Robotics, who aim to take underwater archaeology into the 21st century. Several unique robots have been developed to survey the site in various ways. One of the results of the survey was to establish that the town was the centre of a thriving textile industry (from the many loom weights found in the site). Also many large pithoi (pottery jars) from Crete were excavated, indicating a major trading port.

In 2010, a team from the Hellenic Centre for Maritime Research used the stereo-photogrammetric data collected from the surveying of the site to reconstruct what the shoreline around the site would have looked like. This included the geomorphology of the area between the now island of Elafonisos and the beaches of Pounta in Vigklafia. The reason that this research was done is because they wanted to find out how the site became submerged as well as the time period in which it occurred. They hypothesized that the site would have been slowly lowered over time by three or four different earthquakes. The rising of the sea level over the past 5000 years has also affected the submergence of the site. When Pavlopetri was built in the 4th millennium BC, it would have been about two or three meters above sea level which was normal for that time period and area. In 1200 BC, Pavlopetri was coming close to its demise and the sea level had risen about two meters since its initial inhabitance and at this point it was only about one meter above sea level. This would have made the town susceptible to flooding explaining their complex water system. Sometime between the years 480-650 AD the site was pushed down by tectonic activity which would have been one of the earthquakes. This earthquake pushed the site down about 3 meters and along with the sea level having risen about 1.5 meters since 1200 BC, the site would have been submerged.

== Noteworthy discoveries ==
During excavation in the 2011 season, the team from The University of Nottingham discovered some original deposits that give them some information about the site. These deposits displayed evidence that the people of Pavlopetri had trading relations with the nearby island Crete, inhabited by Minoans. In 1968, the team from the University of Cambridge found something important as well. They discovered two different types of graves indicating a gap in social status. There were two chamber tombs recognized and nearly forty cist graves. They also identified 15 buildings, with up to 12 rooms inside each. There is evidence that Pavlopetri served as a trading hub.

== Dangers to the ruins ==
The site has faced many problems since its discovery in 1967. One of these problems is sediment shifting and damaging the ruins. Small boats travel above the site and move sediment on the seabed that slowly damages the site. Large ships in Vatika Bay are a problem as well. These ships discharge waste that damages the archaeological ruins and is also bad for the environment. There is also ballast water which is water that is used to keep a large ship from capsizing. It does this by either taking in, or releasing water from its ballast tank depending on the weight of the cargo being transported. Ballast water is harmful because it can transport sediment and microorganisms such as, bacteria, microbes, larvae of different species, etc. Some of these organisms can also be invasive. Large ships are also cleaned with an assortment of chemicals to clean different parts of the ship. These chemicals damage the ruins and the environment. Looting has also been a problem in the past as the site does not have any form of protection around it. The final danger to Pavlopetri is a nearby power station and the construction of a gas pipeline that runs from the island of Crete to Peloponnese.

== Preservation efforts ==
After Pavlopetri gained more attention after the research done from 2009-2013 and it was announced that it is in danger, many people decided to get together and try to stop the pollution and damage that was being done. One thing that they are trying to stop is the approving of a certain port regulation that would let large ships anchor in Vatika Bay. They would like to create a safety net of sorts made out of buoys. These buoys would encircle the site and protect it from any ships. They would also like to put up signs around the area that tell people what the site is, what the significance of the site is, and why it needs to be protected. It also had its first ever World Monument Watch Day in 2016. The Watch Day helps bring attention to the damage being done to the site and reaches towards communities across the world to help out. Since then, the Watch Day takes place every year during the summer. Ever since the Watch Day in 2016, there have been guided underwater tours led by professional archaeologists. These tours are offered because of the Ephorate of Underwater Antiquities and the Greek Ministry of Culture.

== UNESCO site ==
The city of Pavlopetri is part of the underwater cultural heritage as defined by the UNESCO in the UNESCO Convention on the Protection of the Underwater Cultural Heritage. All traces of human existence underwater which are one hundred years old or more are protected by the UNESCO Convention on the Protection of the Underwater Cultural Heritage. This convention aims at preventing the destruction or loss of historic and cultural information and looting. It helps states' parties to protect their underwater cultural heritage with an international legal framework.

== In popular culture ==
- The work of the British-Australian archaeological team was assembled in an hour-long BBC documentary video, "City Beneath the Waves: Pavlopetri", broadcast by BBC Two in 2011.
- The site and its history are featured in the "Secrets of the Sunken Empire" episode of the Science Channel TV program Unearthed (season 8, episode 7), originally broadcast on January 3, 2021.
- The ancient site and its underwater mapping is featured in "Drain the Oceans: Legends of Atlantis" (season 1, episode 5), by National Geographic airing on June 25, 2018.

== See also ==
- Akrotiri (prehistoric city) - A Minoan Greek city buried by volcanic eruption
- Atlit Yam - A submerged Neolithic village off the coast of Atlit, Israel
