= HMS Eurotas =

Two ships of the Royal Navy have been named HMS Eurotas, after Eurotas (mythology), a character in Greek mythology:

- HMS Eurotas (1813) was a 38-gun fifth rate launched in 1813 and broken up in 1817.
- HMS Eurotas (1829) was a 46-gun fifth rate launched in 1829, converted to screw propulsion in 1856 and sold in 1865.
