= Niata =

Niata Νιάτα
- Municipal unit
- Location within the regional unit

- Location within Greece
- Coordinates: 36°54′N 22°51′E
- Country: Greece
- Administrative region: Peloponnese
- Regional unit: Laconia
- Municipality: Evrotas

Area
  - Municipal unit: 206.5 km^{2} (79.7 sq mi)

Population (2021)
  - Municipal unit: 1,841
  - Municipal unit density: 8.915/km^{2} (23.09/sq mi)
  - Community: 656
- Time zone: UTC+2 (EET)
  - Summer (DST): UTC+3 (EEST)
- Vehicle registration: AK

Niata (Greek: Νιάτα) is a village and a former municipality in Laconia, Peloponnese, Greece. Since the 2011 local government reform, it is part of the municipality Evrotas, of which it is a municipal unit. The municipal unit has an area of 206.502 km^{2} (79.731 sq mi) and a population of 1,841 (2021). The seat of the municipality was in Agios Dimitrios. The municipal unit comprises the villages of Niata, Agios Dimitrios, Apidea and Kremasti.
