= Aphrodisias (Laconia) =

Coordinates: 36°32′49″N 22°59′17″E

Aphrodisias (Ancient Greek: Ἀφροδισίας), also known as Aphrodisia (Ἀφροδισία), was a town in the south of ancient Laconia, on the Boeatic Gulf, said to have been founded by Aeneas.

Its site is located near the modern Megali Spilia.
