= Voies =

Voies Βοιές
- Municipal unit
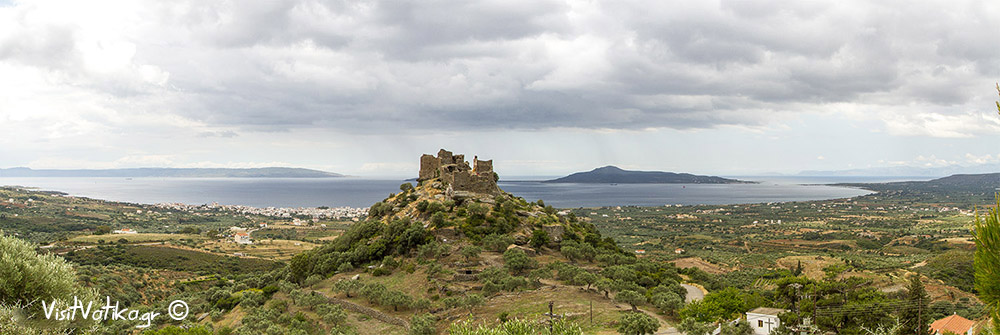
- Castle of Agia Paraskevi and Vatika region

- Location within the regional unit

- Location within Greece
- Coordinates: 36°30′N 23°4′E
- Country: Greece
- Administrative region: Peloponnese
- Regional unit: Laconia
- Municipality: Monemvasia

Area
  - Municipal unit: 215.5 km^{2} (83.2 sq mi)
- Elevation: 15 m (49 ft)

Population (2021)
  - Municipal unit: 7,235
  - Municipal unit density: 33.57/km^{2} (86.95/sq mi)
- Time zone: UTC+2 (EET)
  - Summer (DST): UTC+3 (EEST)
- Postal code: 230 53
- Area code: 27340
- Vehicle registration: ΑΚ
- Website: VisitVatika.gr

Voies (Greek: Βοιές Greek pronunciation: [/viˈes/], feminine plural) is a former municipality in Laconia, Peloponnese, Greece. Since the 2011 local government reform it is part of the municipality Monemvasia, of which it is a municipal unit. The municipal unit has an area of 215.527 km^{2}. It is on the southern tip of Cape Malea. It is a predominantly agricultural region with a few minor villages and one dominant town. Vatika is the common term for the area, but Voies is used in a more official context, particularly for postal situations. Voion, the genitive, is used for description: for example, to differentiate the village of Agios Nikolaos in Voies from other villages and towns of the same name, one would use Agios Nikolaos Voion. Neapoli is the administrative capital of the municipality, and is also the urban center to the numerous villages that surround the hinterland.

In the Kato Kastania village of Voies is found the large and colorful Kastania Cave.

== Geography ==
There is a single mountain range that runs through the center of the municipality dividing it into two parts, both an east and west section. Adjacent to the west coast of the region lies the island of Elafonisos. The island contains some of the oldest evidence of human inhabitance in the whole of the Peloponnese.

== Historical population ==
Year	Neapoli	Municipality
1981	2,113	-
1991	2,469	7,802
2001	2,751	7,871
2011	3,130	7,703
2021	2,787	7,235

== History ==
The name of the region derives from the initial name of the town of Neapoli, Boiai (Ancient Greek: Βοιαί), which is thought to have been founded in the second century BC. The feminine plural ending has evolved from -αί to -ες.

The ancient writer Pausanias wrote that Boiai was founded "...by Boios, one of the Heraclidae, who is supposed to have gathered the people from three cities: Etis, Aphrodisias and Side".

== Neapoli ==
Neapoli (Greek: Νεάπολη meaning "new city") (36°30′42″N 23°03′31″E) is the largest town of the former municipality. It was initially an agricultural center, but now has seen a rise in the numbers of tourists (particularly visitors to the neighbouring island of Elafonisos). The commercial center of the town is located on the water front, facing Vatika Bay. There are ferries to the islands Kythira and Elafonisos. The town is surrounded by the villages of Faraklo, Paradisi and Lachi in its hinterland, and Kambos located on the same plain as Neapoli. Neapoli has a kindergarten school, a school, a church and a square.

== Agios Nikolaos ==
Agios Nikolaos (Greek: Άγιος Νικολάος) (36°28′38″N 23°05′53″E) is a small village, south-east of Neapoli. It has a largely agricultural population; however, many inhabitants are employed in the shipping industries.

== Places of interest ==
- Neapoli

Villages:

- Velanidia (Βελανίδια), a Byzantine village about 17 km from Neapoli, it includes several Byzantine churches.
- Faraklo (Φάρακλο)
- Lachi (Λάχι) - Site of the Ancient city named Itis.
- Mesochori (Μεσοχώρι) - A village with Byzantine origins.
- Agios Nikolaos (Άγιος Νικόλαος) - The Agricultural center for the Municipality. The original name of the village dating back in the 17th century was "Panagia" from a homonymous temple of Virgin Mary. Most of the inhabitants trace their ancestry from the Western parts of Crete that was occupied by the Ottomans in 1669 resulting to a wide refugee influx in the Vatica area. Moreover, people from the island of Kythera started populating the village from the early 19th century and onwards. Known families include "Nychas" family presumably indigenous since the 17th century, "Pavlakis" Cretan ancestry and "Michaletos" Venetian ancestry coming from Crete as well. The village has a strong diaspora concentrated in Australia and Pretoria -South Africa.
- Paradeisi (Παραδέισι)
- Ano Kastania (Ανό Καστανία) - The location of many Byzantine Churches and Monasteries.
- Kato Kastania (Κάτο Καστανία)
- Viglafia (Βιγκλάφια)
- Elafonisos - A small island just 500 m of the coast of Vatika near Viglafia.
- Pantanassa

== See also ==
- List of settlements in Laconia
