= Neapoli Voion =

Neapoli Voion Νεάπολη Βοιών
- Community
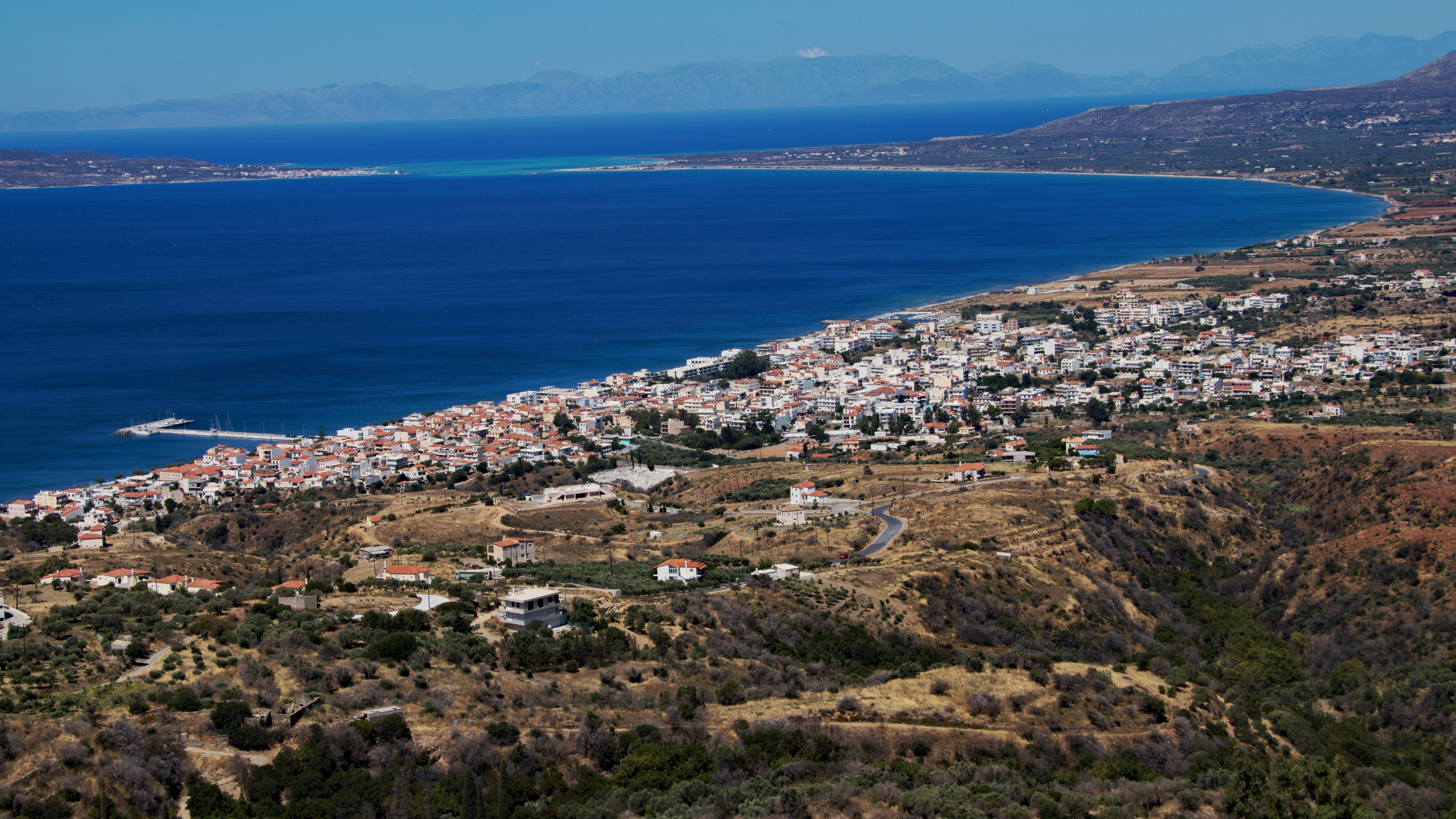

- Location within Greece
- Coordinates: 36°30′44″N 23°03′31″E
- Country: Greece
- Administrative region: Peloponnese
- Regional unit: Laconia
- Municipality: Monemvasia
- Municipal unit: Voies

Population (2021)
  - Community: 2,787
- Time zone: UTC+2 (EET)
  - Summer (DST): UTC+3 (EEST)
- Vehicle registration: AK

Neapoli Voion or Neapolis Voion (Greek: Νεάπολη Βοιών) also named Vatika (Greek: Βάτικα) is a small town in Laconia regional unit, southern Greece. It is built near the south end of Malea peninsula, close to the Cape Maleas. It is 335 km southwest of Athens and 115 km south of Sparta. Its port is the gateway for the island of south Peloponnese such as Kythera, Antikythera and Elafonisos. Neapoli is the part of Monemvasia municipality and Voies municipal unit.

== History ==
Neapoli is built on the same site as the ancient Laconian city of Boeae, built in the 10th or 9th century BCE by the Heracleid Boeus. The city later became part of the city-state of Sparta. During the early Roman era the city belonged to the Koinon of Free Laconians and flourished. The city later declined and was completely destroyed in 365 AD^{a} by an earthquake. In the Middle Ages, the name was corrupted to Vatika, which is still used for the local citadel. In modern times in this place there was a village after the name Pezoula. In 1837 the Bavarian architect Birbach designed the street plan of a new town that was named Neapoli ("New Town").

An earthquake occurred on 18 November 2019 between Neapoli Voion and the island of Elafonisos at 03:25 local time, and reached an estimated magnitude of 3,6.

== Historical population ==
Census	Settlement	Community
1991	2,469	
2001	2,727	2,751
2011	3,090	3,130
2021	2,715	2,787

== Tourism ==
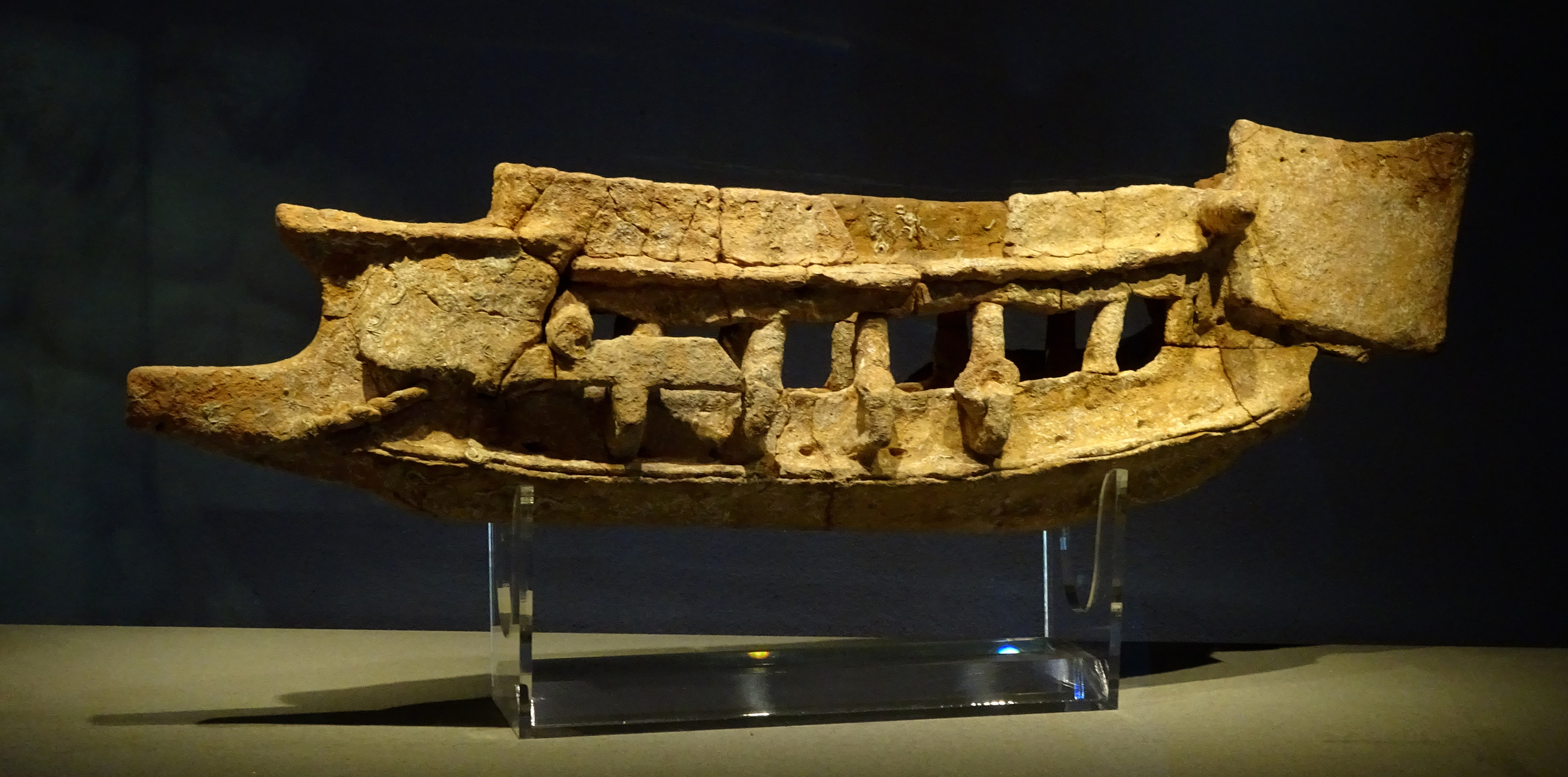
Clay model of a galley, Archaeological Museum of Neapoli Voion.

Offshore from Neapoli is the small island Elafonisos that is known for its big sandy beaches. There are other beaches also around Neapoli. These include the beaches at Neratzionas and Maganos. Near Neapoli, at the village of Kastania, is located the Kastania Cave known also as Cave of Agios Andreas. A village close to Neapolis is Faraklo. It was built by the Venetians and was the most important village of the area during Venetian rule and later Ottoman rule.

There are two museums in the village: the Archaeological Museum of Neapolis Voion and the Museum for the Promotion of Maritime Tradition.

== Notes ==
- ^a The reference writes wrongly 375, but "the massive earthquake" only can refer to the 365 Crete earthquake.
