= Elafonisos =

Island in Greece

Elafonisos Ελαφόνησος
- Municipality
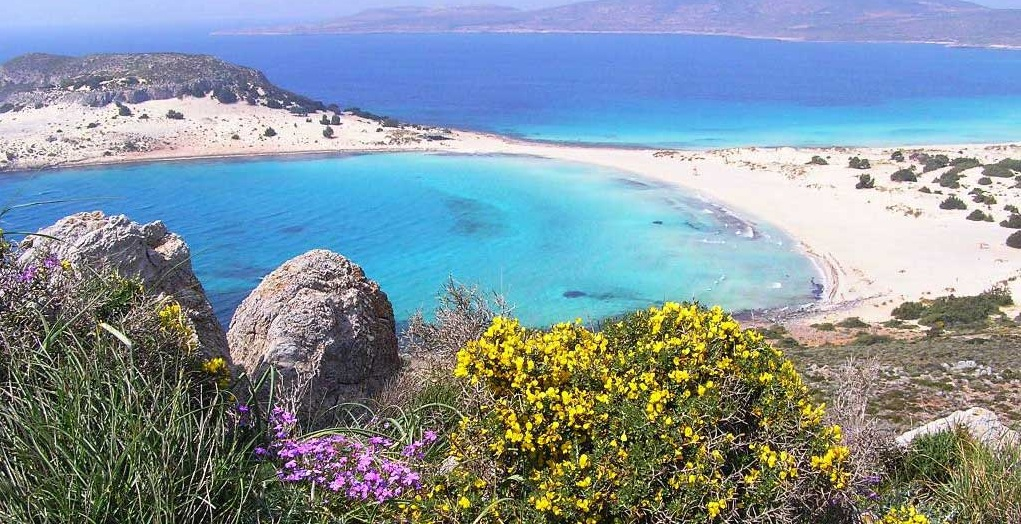

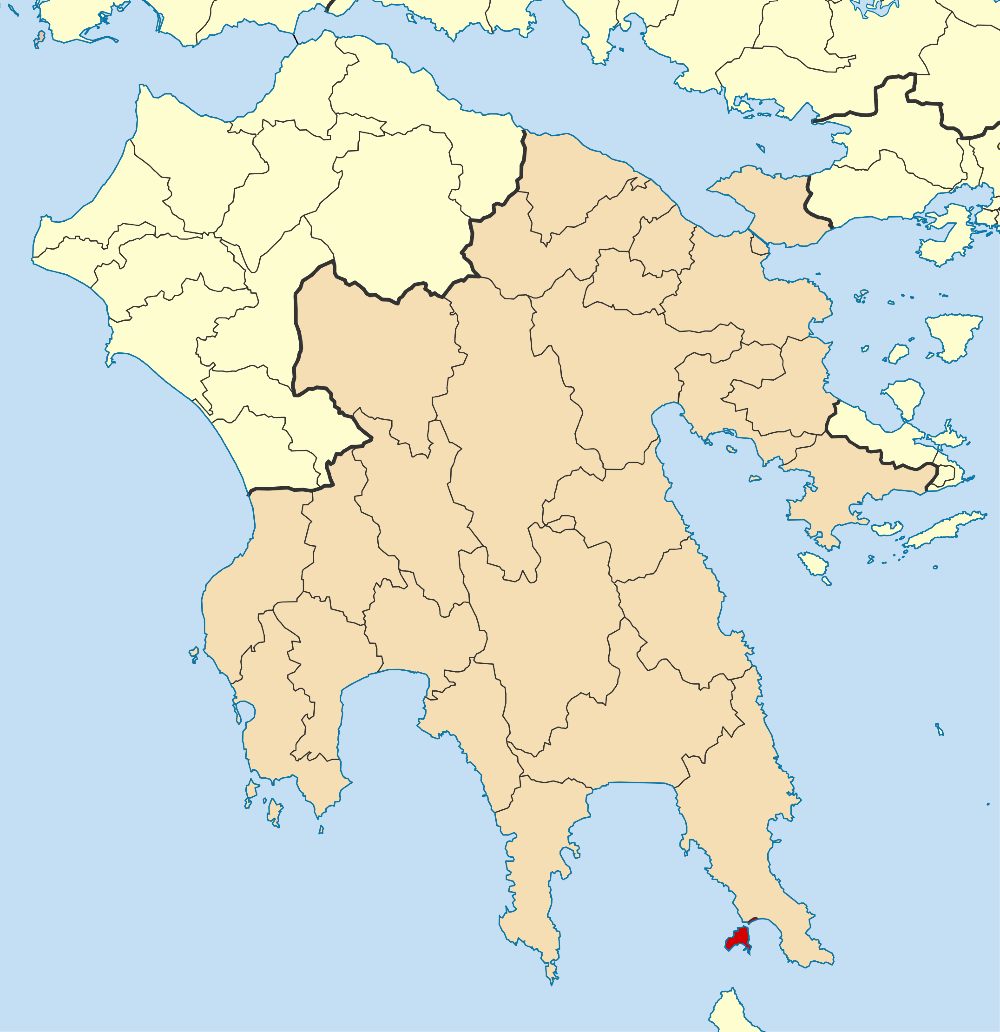

- Location within Greece
- Coordinates: 36°29′15″N 22°57′45″E
- Country: Greece
- Administrative region: Peloponnese
- Regional unit: Laconia

Area
  - Municipality: 19.992 km^{2} (7.719 sq mi)
- Highest elevation: 277 m (909 ft)
- Lowest elevation: 0 m (0 ft)

Population (2021)
  - Municipality: 898
  - Density: 44.9/km^{2} (116/sq mi)
- Time zone: UTC+2 (EET)
  - Summer (DST): UTC+3 (EEST)
- Postal code: 230 53
- Area code: 27340
- Vehicle registration: ΑΚ

Elafonisos (Greek: Ελαφόνησος) is a small Greek island between the Peloponnese and Kythira. It lies off the coast of Cape Malea and Vatika. The area of the island is 19 square kilometres (7 square miles).

== Overview ==
Elafonisos map.

The population is between 300 and 350 during the winter but increases dramatically in the summer months. During July and August the number of tourist visitors reach over 3,000 per day (bringing with them some 1,600 cars). Many people visit the island for its light coloured, sandy beaches. Among the most well known of its beaches are Sarakiniko, Fragos (Simos) and Panagias Nissia, all filled with blue-green waters.

Elafonisos is by far the largest inhabited island in the Peloponnese archipelago, and the only one that is a separate municipality. There are also some archaeological discoveries to explore on the island and in the surrounding waters. The main church of the community is Agios Spyridon (Greek: Άγιος Σπυρίδων), which is built on a separate, tiny piece of land which is connected by a bridge over shallow waters to the rest of the island. The community's land area also includes 3 km^{2} (1 sq mi) of the mainland consisting mainly of the famous Punta Beach.

On the nearby mainland, approximately 6.5 km (4.0 mi) east is Neapoli (Greek: Νεάπολη) of the municipality of Vatika. About 8.5 km (5.3 mi) south is Cape Frangos (Greek: Φράγκο) on the island of Kythira.

== Historical population ==
Year	Island population	Municipality population
1981	611	—
1991	653	725
2001	625	745
2011	816	1,041
2021	743	898

== History ==
In antiquity, Elafonisos did not constitute an island but a peninsula with the name Onou Gnathos (Greek: Ὄνου Γνάθος meaning donkey's jawbone) according to Pausanias. Just off the coast of Elafonisos lies the archeological site of Pavlopetri, a sunken city dating back to the early 3rd millennium BC and thought to have been claimed by the sea around 1000 BC.
