= Molaoi =

Town in Laconia, Greece

Molaoi Μολάοι
- Municipal unit
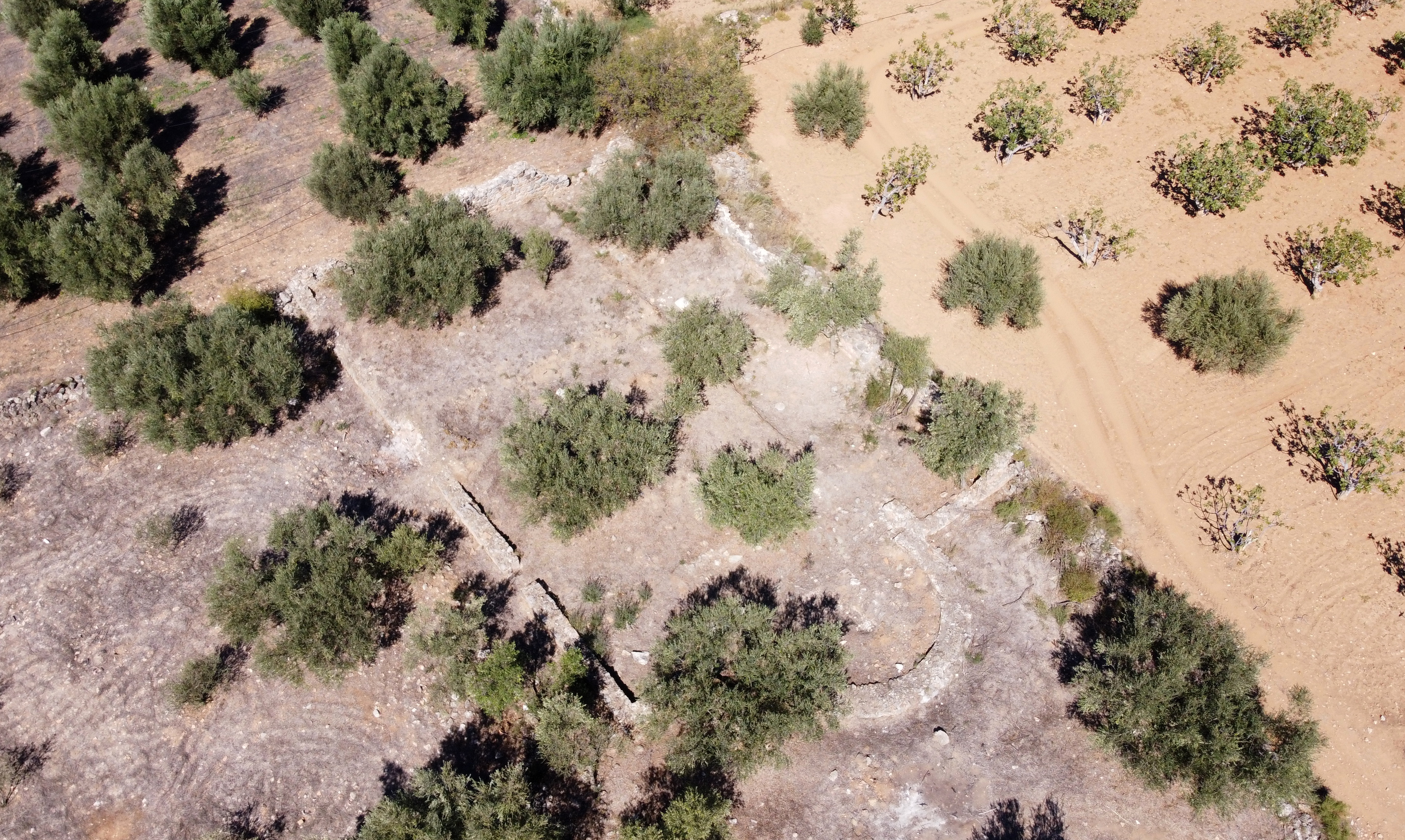

- Location within the regional unit

- Location within Greece
- Coordinates: 36°48′N 22°51′E
- Country: Greece
- Administrative region: Peloponnese
- Regional unit: Laconia
- Municipality: Monemvasia

Area
  - Municipal unit: 193.2 km^{2} (74.6 sq mi)
- Elevation: 15 m (49 ft)

Population (2021)
  - Municipal unit: 5,124
  - Municipal unit density: 26.52/km^{2} (68.69/sq mi)
  - Community: 2,850
- Time zone: UTC+2 (EET)
  - Summer (DST): UTC+3 (EEST)
- Postal code: 230 52
- Area code: 27320
- Vehicle registration: ΑΚ
- Website: www.molaoi.gov.gr

Molaoi (Greek: Μολάοι) is a town and a former municipality in Laconia, Peloponnese, Greece. Since the 2011 local government reform it is part of the municipality Monemvasia, of which it is the seat and a municipal unit. The municipal unit has an area of 193.167 km^{2}.

== History ==
The name of the village derived from the Latin word Mola (mill). Mola was mentioned for first time in the Treaty of Sapienza (1209). The current name Molaoi was mentioned during 15th century. During late medieval and early Ottoman era, Molaoi remained a small village, overshadowed by nearby Monemvasia. Molaoi was destroyed during the Orlov Revolt. Many inhabitants of Kandila bearing the name "Antonakos" (Greek: Αντωνάκος) migrated to Koldere, near Magnesia (ad Sipylum), where they arrived in 1777. The village was destroyed again by Ibrahim in 1825, during the Greek War of Independence. After Greek independence was achieved, Molaoi increased its population, receiving residents from Monemvasia, Crete, the Mani peninsula and nearby villages. It then evolved into a local administrative centre.

== Historical population ==
Census	Community	Municipal unit
1991	3,010	
2001	3,021	5,597
2011	2,534	4,980
2021	2,850	5,124
