= Evrotas (municipality) =

Municipality in Laconia, Greece

Evrotas Ευρώτας
- Municipality
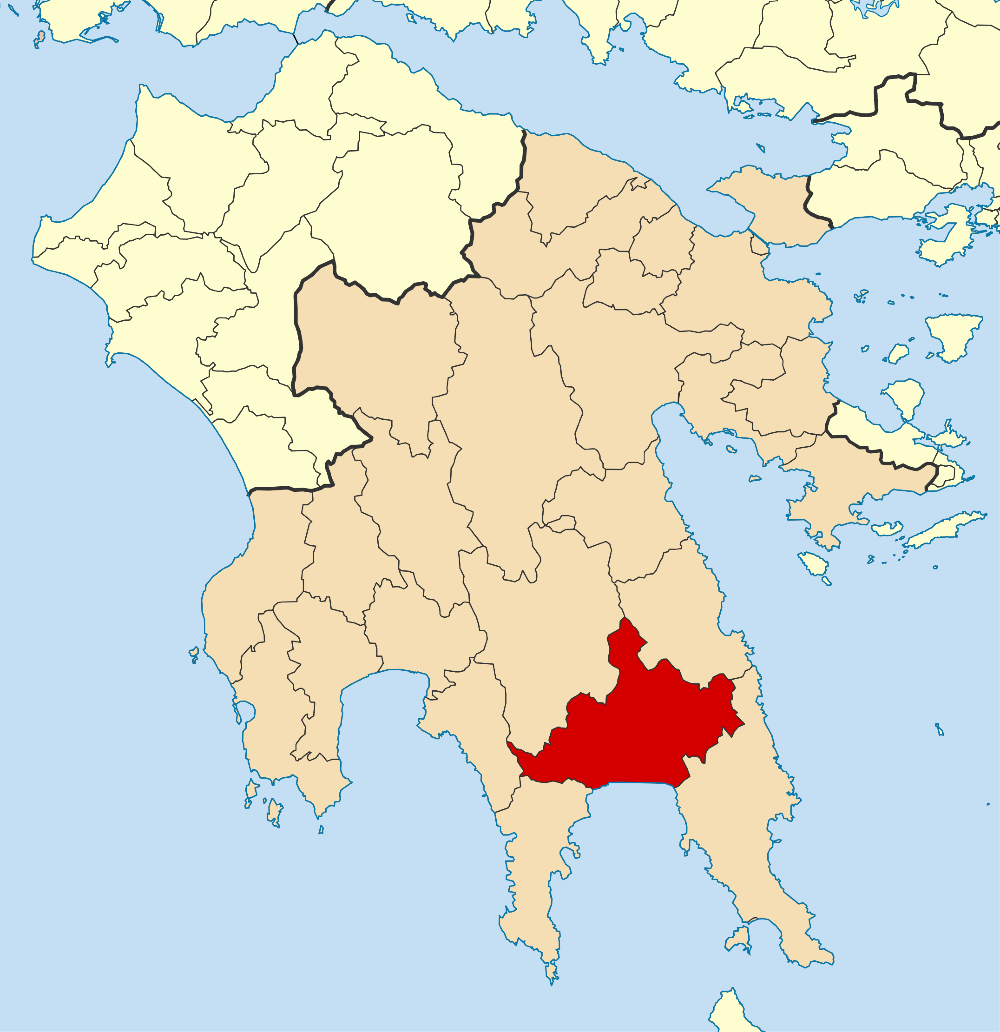

- Location within Greece
- Coordinates: 36°51′N 22°40′E
- Country: Greece
- Administrative region: Peloponnese
- Regional unit: Laconia
- Seat: Skala

Area
  - Municipality: 811.7 km^{2} (313.4 sq mi)

Population (2021)
  - Municipality: 16,058
  - Density: 19.78/km^{2} (51.24/sq mi)
- Time zone: UTC+2 (EET)
  - Summer (DST): UTC+3 (EEST)

Evrotas (Greek: Ευρώτας) is a municipality in the Laconia regional unit, Peloponnese, Greece. It is named after the river Eurotas. The seat of the municipality is the town Skala. The municipality has an area of 811.734 km^{2}.

== Municipality ==
The municipality Evrotas was formed at the 2011 local government reform by the merger of the following 5 former municipalities, that became municipal units:

- Elos
- Geronthres
- Krokees
- Niata
- Skala

== Elevation ==
Some areas in the south part of the municipality have a negative elevation reaching down to -3.3 meters below the sea level.
