= Skala, Laconia =

Skala Σκάλα
- Municipal unit
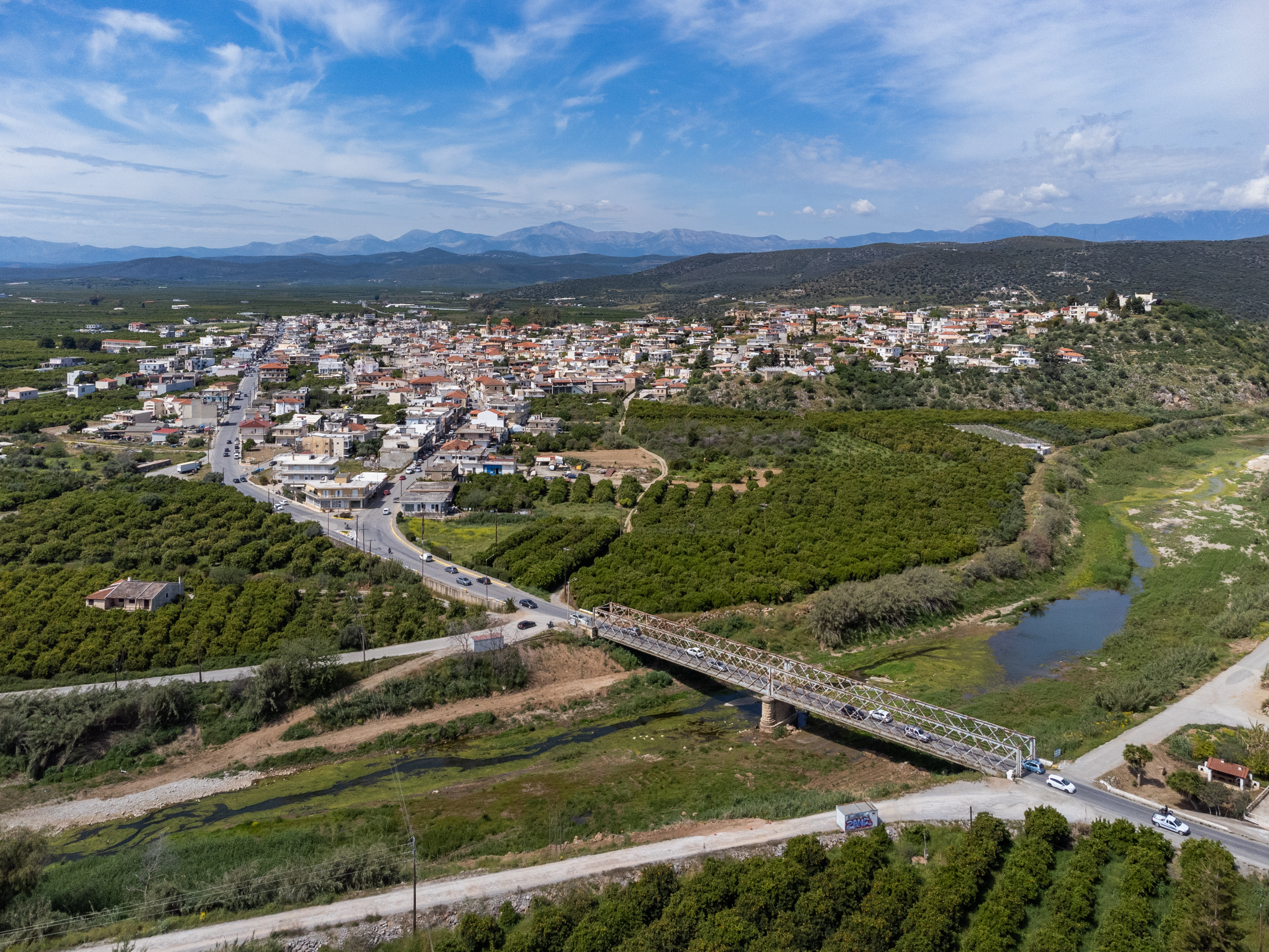

- Location within the regional unit

- Location within Greece
- Coordinates: 36°51′N 22°40′E
- Country: Greece
- Administrative region: Peloponnese
- Regional unit: Laconia
- Municipality: Evrotas

Area
  - Municipal unit: 143.9 km^{2} (55.6 sq mi)

Population (2021)
  - Municipal unit: 5,175
  - Municipal unit density: 35.96/km^{2} (93.14/sq mi)
  - Community: 2,902
- Time zone: UTC+2 (EET)
  - Summer (DST): UTC+3 (EEST)
- Vehicle registration: AK

Skala (Greek: Σκάλα) is a town and a former municipality in Laconia, Peloponnese, Greece. Since the 2011 local government reform it is part of the municipality Evrotas, of which it is the seat and a municipal unit. The municipal unit has an area of 143.945 km^{2}. Population 5,175 (2021). Skala is known for organic food production.

== History ==
Following the Orlov events, in 1777, many inhabitants of Skala bearing the name "Mavroudas" (Greek: Μαυρούδας) migrated to Koldere, near Magnesia (ad Sipylum).

== Notable people ==
- Tracy Spiridakos, actress, her father was from here and she lived here for a few years
