= Cape Maleas =

Peninsula and cape in Greece

Coordinates: 36°26′17″N 23°11′55″E

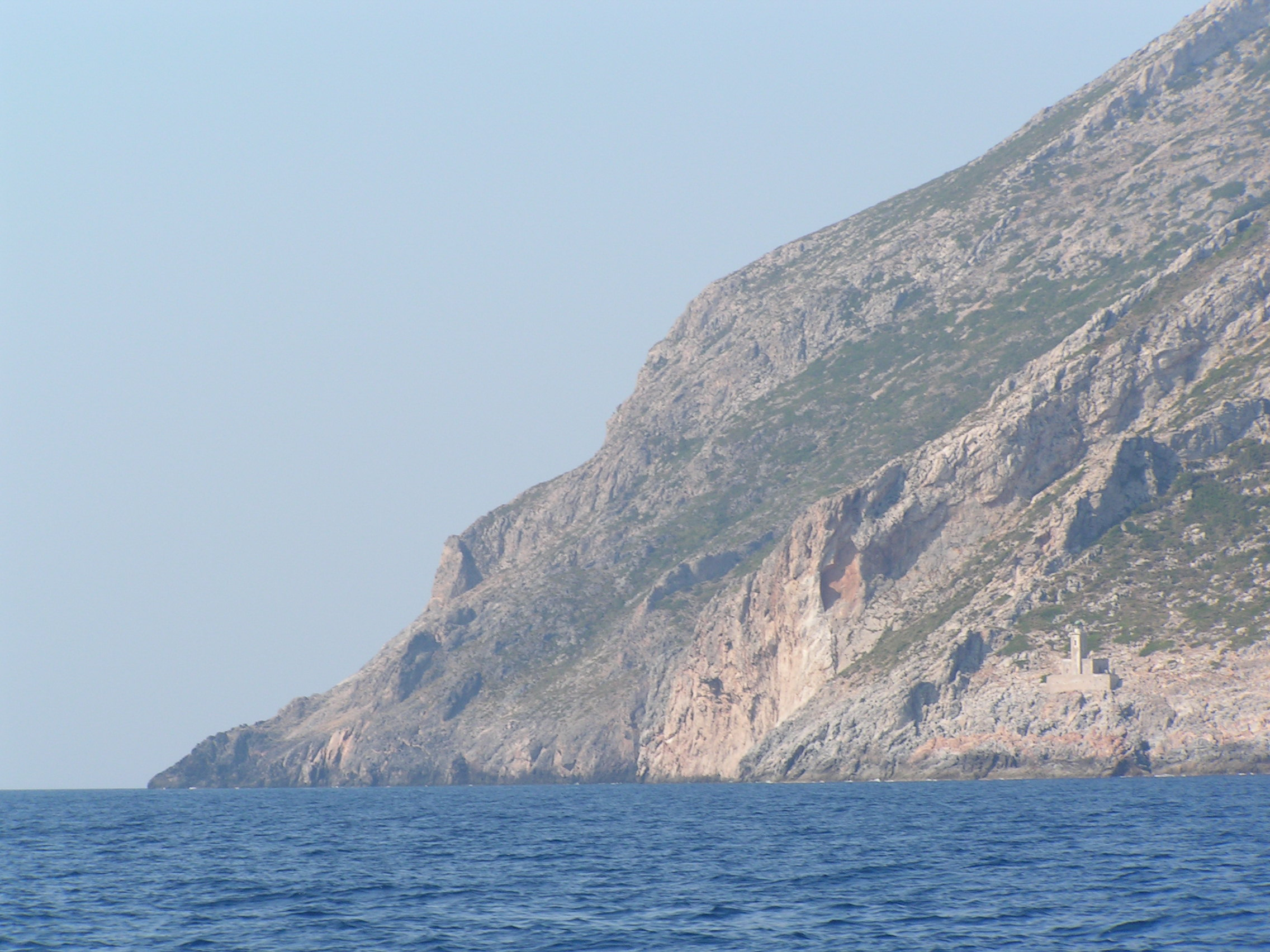
The headland of Cape Maleas, known for its treacherous weather, with the lighthouse in the foreground to the right.

Cape Maleas (also Cape Malea; Greek: Ακρωτήριον Μαλέας, colloquially Καβομαλιάς, Cavomaliás), anciently Malea (Ancient Greek: Μαλέα) and Maleae or Maleai (Μαλέαι), is a peninsula and cape in the southeast of the Peloponnese in Greece. To distinguish it from the cape, the peninsula is sometimes referred to as "Epidavros Limira" peninsula, after the most prominent ancient city located on it. It separates the Laconian Gulf in the west from the Aegean Sea in the east. It is the second most southerly point of mainland Greece (after Cape Matapan) and once featured one of the largest light-houses in the Mediterranean. The seas around the cape are notoriously treacherous and difficult to navigate, featuring variable weather and occasionally very powerful storms.

== Geography ==
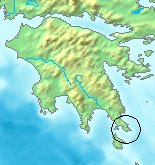
Cape Maleas topography.

Cape Maleas is in the regional unit of Laconia. The municipality of Monemvasia covers the entire peninsula and part of the eastern coast. The municipal unit of Voies (Greek: Βοιές) is located in the southern extremity of the peninsula, with Neapoli, the largest town on the peninsula.

To the west of the peninsula lies the island of Elafonisos, known for its long, light-coloured sandy beaches.

== History ==
In ancient times it was a busy shipping lane, and one of the major routes for crossing from the northeast Mediterranean to the west. The cape was notorious for its bad weather at the time as well, most famously as recounted in the Odyssey, and much later by Xenophon in Hellenica. Homer describes how Odysseus on his return home to Ithaca rounds Cape Maleas only to be blown off course, resulting in his being lost for up to 10 years by some people's reckoning. Xenophon records the occasion when Callicratidas camped his sailors for dinner before attacking the Athenians in Arginusae, when a thunderstorm delayed Callicratidas's embarkment.

Cape Maleas is mentioned in an inscription from a Roman-era tomb in Hierapolis (modern Pamukkale, Turkey) belonging to the merchant Flavius Zeuxis. His epitaph commemorates his seafaring career, noting that he "sailed seventy-two times round Cape Malea" on his voyages between Asia Minor and Italy.

The Cape's importance declined with the opening of the Corinth Canal, which allowed ships to bypass the Peloponnese rather than circumnavigating it. However, it still has significant amounts of sea traffic as the Corinth Canal can only accommodate ships less than 21m in width.

In World War II, the German occupying forces began construction of a military tower for defense and surveillance of the major shipping lane. The construction was halted with the end of occupation in 1944.

In 2025, the cape was designated as a biosphere reserve by UNESCO.
