= Laconia =

Historic and administrative region of Greece

Laconia Περιφερειακή ενότητα Λακωνίας
- Regional unit
- Municipalities of Laconia

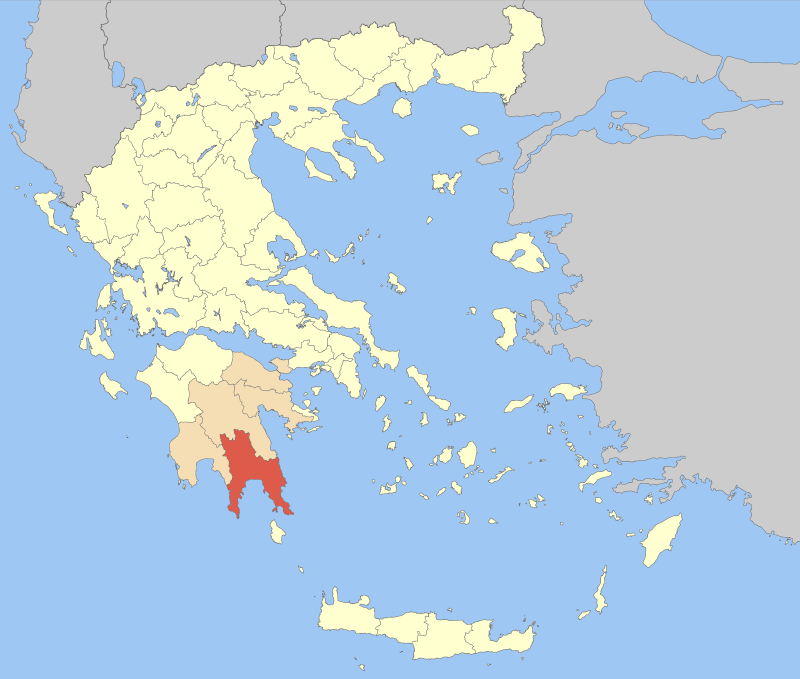
- Laconia within Greece

- Location within Greece
- Coordinates: 37.0°N 22.5°E
- Country: Greece
- Administrative region: Peloponnese
- Seat: Sparta
- Districts: Laconia constituency

Area
  - Total: 3,636 km^{2} (1,404 sq mi)

Population (2021)
  - Total: 84,337
  - Density: 23.19/km^{2} (60.07/sq mi)
- Demonym: Laconian(s)
- Time zone: UTC+2 (EET)
  - Summer (DST): UTC+3 (EEST)
- Postal code: 23x xx
- Area code: 273x0
- Vehicle registration: ΑΚ

Laconia or Lakonia (Greek: Λακωνία, Lakonía, [lakoˈni.a]) is a historical and administrative region of Greece located on the southeastern part of the Peloponnese peninsula. Since 2011, it has been administered as a regional unit, with Sparta as its capital. The word laconic—meaning, "spoken in a blunt, concise way"—is derived from the name of this region, a reference to the ancient Spartans who were renowned for their verbal austerity and blunt, often pithy remarks.

== Geography ==
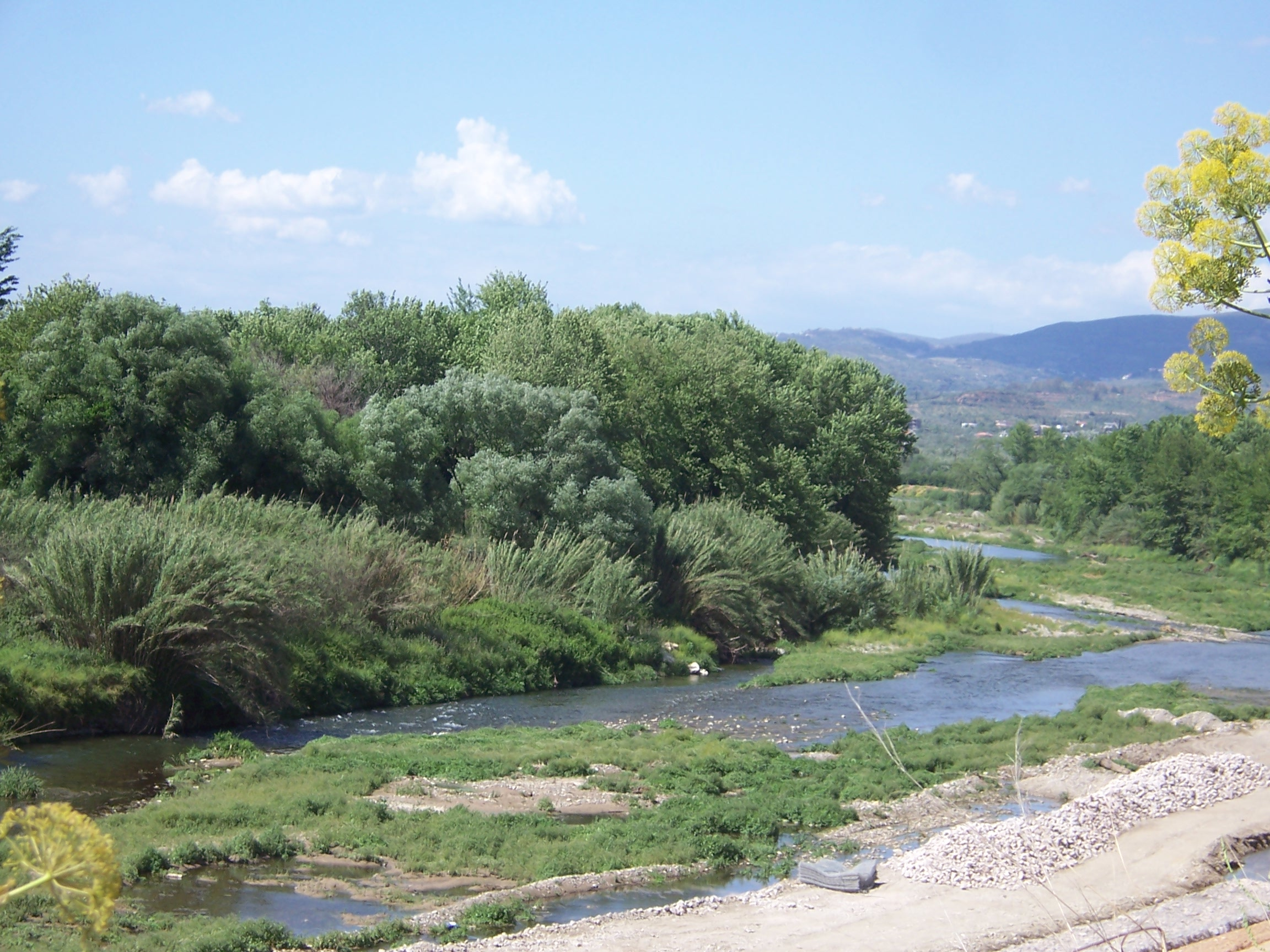
Eurotas river outside the city of Sparti

Laconia is bordered by Messenia to the west and Arcadia to the north and is surrounded by the Myrtoan Sea to the east and by the Laconian Gulf and the Mediterranean Sea to the south. It encompasses Cape Malea and Cape Tainaron and a large part of the Mani Peninsula. The Mani Peninsula is in the west region of Laconia. The islands of Kythira and Antikythera lie to the south, but they administratively belong to the Attica regional unit of islands. The island Elafonisos, situated between the Laconian mainland and Kythira, is part of Laconia.

The Evrotas is the longest river in the prefecture. The Evrotas Valley is predominantly an agricultural region that contains many citrus groves, olive groves, and pasture lands. It is the location of the largest orange production in the Peloponnese and probably in all of Greece. Lakonia, a brand of orange juice, is based in Amykles.

The main mountain ranges are the Taygetus 2,407 m (7,897 ft) in the west and the Parnon 1,961 m (6,434 ft) in the northeast. Taygetus, known as Pentadaktylos (five-fingers) throughout the Middle Ages, is west of Sparta and the Evrotas Valley. It is the highest mountain in Laconia and the Peloponnese and is mostly covered with pine trees. Two roads join the Messenia and Laconia prefectures: one is a tortuous mountain pass through Taygetus and the other bypasses the mountain via the Mani district to the south.

The stalactite cave, Dirou, a major tourist attraction, is located south of Areopolis in the southwest of Laconia.

=== Climate ===
The city of Sparta enjoys a sunny and warm Mediterranean climate (Köppen: Csa). January highs are around 14 °C (57 °F) while July and August highs are around 36 °C (97 °F) in the city proper. Sparta records the highest summer average maximum temperatures in Greece. In July 2012 the city registered an average maximum temperature of 38.3 °C (100.9 °F), making it Greece's second highest monthly average maximum temperature to date after the 38.6 °C (101.5 °F) recorded in Stylida in July 2023. The highest temperature ever recorded in Sparta is 45.7 °C (114.3 °F) in August 2021. On average, Sparta records 5 days per year with temperatures of over 40.0 °C (104.0 °F).

Climate data for Sparta (2009–2024)
Month	Jan	Feb	Mar	Apr	May	Jun	Jul	Aug	Sep	Oct	Nov	Dec	Year
Record high °C (°F)	23.5 (74.3)	26.4 (79.5)	27.2 (81.0)	34.1 (93.4)	40.7 (105.3)	44.4 (111.9)	44.2 (111.6)	45.7 (114.3)	40.3 (104.5)	36.4 (97.5)	30.8 (87.4)	23.5 (74.3)	45.7 (114.3)
Mean daily maximum °C (°F)	14.4 (57.9)	16.1 (61.0)	18.4 (65.1)	22.8 (73.0)	27.8 (82.0)	32.5 (90.5)	36.0 (96.8)	35.9 (96.6)	31.3 (88.3)	25.3 (77.5)	20.2 (68.4)	16.1 (61.0)	24.7 (76.5)
Daily mean °C (°F)	8.8 (47.8)	10.0 (50.0)	12.0 (53.6)	15.4 (59.7)	20.0 (68.0)	24.6 (76.3)	27.7 (81.9)	27.7 (81.9)	23.8 (74.8)	18.5 (65.3)	14.1 (57.4)	10.2 (50.4)	17.7 (63.9)
Mean daily minimum °C (°F)	3.1 (37.6)	4.0 (39.2)	5.6 (42.1)	8.0 (46.4)	12.2 (54.0)	16.7 (62.1)	19.5 (67.1)	19.6 (67.3)	16.4 (61.5)	11.8 (53.2)	7.9 (46.2)	4.4 (39.9)	10.8 (51.4)
Record low °C (°F)	−5.3 (22.5)	−4.2 (24.4)	−4.6 (23.7)	−0.7 (30.7)	6.2 (43.2)	9.4 (48.9)	14.2 (57.6)	13.1 (55.6)	9.1 (48.4)	1.5 (34.7)	−1.7 (28.9)	−5.2 (22.6)	−5.3 (22.5)
Average rainfall mm (inches)	122.6 (4.83)	82.3 (3.24)	62.4 (2.46)	33.1 (1.30)	24.8 (0.98)	35.3 (1.39)	11.9 (0.47)	19.0 (0.75)	52.2 (2.06)	61.5 (2.42)	88.1 (3.47)	92.0 (3.62)	685.2 (26.99)
Source: National Observatory of Athens (Feb 2009 - Feb 2024), Sparta N.O.A station, World Meteorological Organization

Climate data for Sparta Air Base (HNMS, 1974–2004)
Month	Jan	Feb	Mar	Apr	May	Jun	Jul	Aug	Sep	Oct	Nov	Dec	Year
Mean daily maximum °C (°F)	14.4 (57.9)	15.1 (59.2)	17.7 (63.9)	21.3 (70.3)	27.0 (80.6)	32.2 (90.0)	34.8 (94.6)	34.3 (93.7)	30.5 (86.9)	25.7 (78.3)	19.4 (66.9)	15.2 (59.4)	24.0 (75.1)
Daily mean °C (°F)	9.6 (49.3)	10.2 (50.4)	12.4 (54.3)	15.8 (60.4)	21.2 (70.2)	26.2 (79.2)	28.5 (83.3)	27.8 (82.0)	24.2 (75.6)	19.6 (67.3)	14.2 (57.6)	10.8 (51.4)	18.4 (65.1)
Mean daily minimum °C (°F)	3.5 (38.3)	3.8 (38.8)	5.5 (41.9)	7.6 (45.7)	11.8 (53.2)	15.9 (60.6)	18.7 (65.7)	18.0 (64.4)	15.3 (59.5)	12.3 (54.1)	8.2 (46.8)	5.1 (41.2)	10.5 (50.9)
Average rainfall mm (inches)	90.7 (3.57)	84.6 (3.33)	73.3 (2.89)	66.0 (2.60)	47.4 (1.87)	14.6 (0.57)	18.8 (0.74)	26.4 (1.04)	30.8 (1.21)	54.6 (2.15)	90.0 (3.54)	107.9 (4.25)	705.1 (27.76)
Source: Meteoclub.gr

== History ==
=== Ancient ===
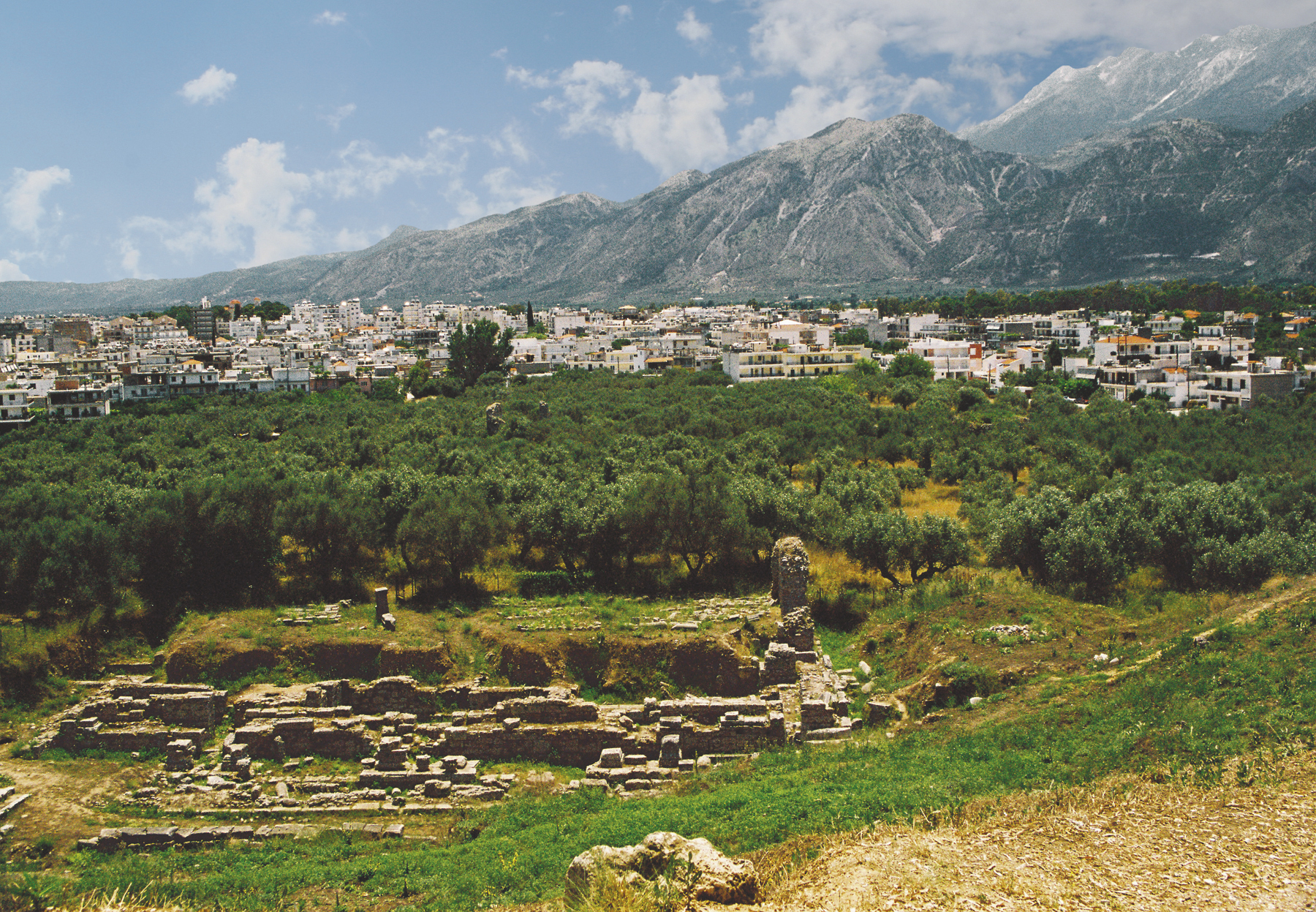
The theater of ancient Sparta with modern Sparti and Taygetus in the background

Evidence of Neolithic settlement in southern Laconia has been found during excavations of the Alepotrypa cave site. Significant archaeological recovery exists at the Vaphio-tomb site in Laconia. Found there is advanced Bronze Age art as well as evidence of cultural associations with the contemporaneous Minoan culture on Crete. At the end of the Mycenean period, the population of Laconia sharply declined. In classical Greece, Laconia was Spartan territory but from the 4th century BC onward Sparta lost control of various ports, towns and areas. From the mid-2nd century BC until 395 AD, Laconia was a part of the Roman Empire.

=== Medieval ===
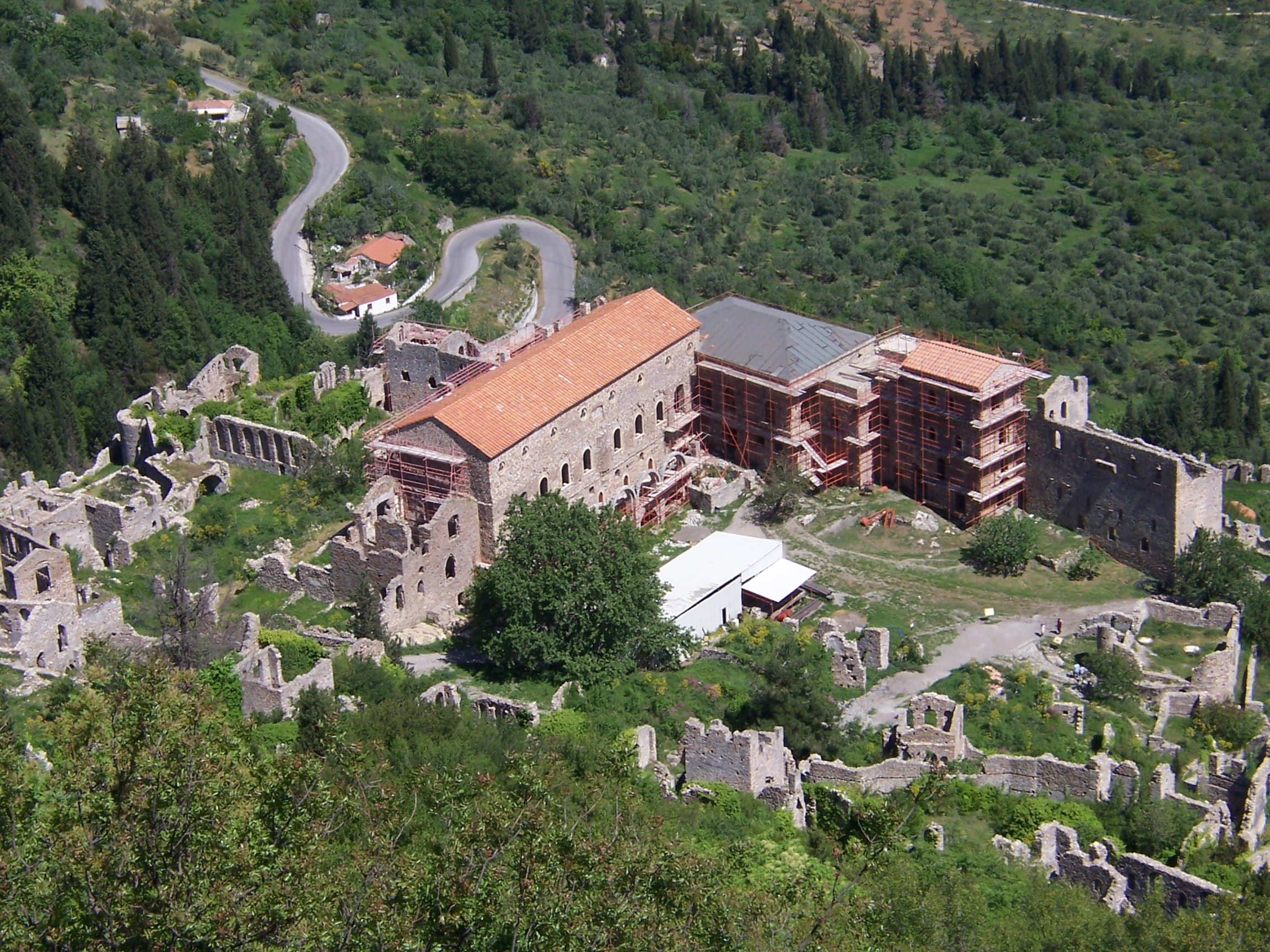
Palace of Mystras

In the medieval period, Laconia formed part of the Byzantine Empire. In the 7th century, Slavic tribes settled in the Peloponnese. Two of them, the Melingoi and the Ezeritai, who settled in parts of Laconia, survived the subsequent Byzantine reconquest and re-Hellenization of the Peloponnese, and are attested until the late Middle Ages.

Following the Fourth Crusade, Laconia was gradually conquered by the Frankish Principality of Achaea. In the 1260s, the Byzantines recovered Mystras and other fortresses in the region and managed to evict the Franks from Laconia, which became the nucleus of a new Byzantine province. By the mid-14th century, this evolved into the Despotate of the Morea, held by the last Greek ruling dynasty, the Palaiologoi. The capital of the Despotate, Mystras, was a major site of the Palaiologan Renaissance, the last flowering of Byzantine culture. With the fall of the Despotate to the Ottomans in 1460, Laconia was conquered as well.

=== Modern ===
With the exception of a 30-year interval of Venetian rule, Laconia remained under Ottoman control until the outbreak of the Greek War of Independence of 1821. Following independence, Sparta was selected as the capital of the modern prefecture, and its economy and agriculture expanded. With the incorporation of the British-ruled Ionian Islands into Greece in 1864, Elafonissos became part of the prefecture. After World War II and the Greek Civil War, its population began to somewhat decline, as people moved from the villages toward the larger cities of Greece and abroad.

In 1992, a devastating fire ruined the finest olive crops in the northern part of the prefecture, and affected the area of Sellasia along with Oinountas and its surrounding areas. Firefighters, helicopters and planes battled for days to put out the horrific fire.

In early 2006, flooding ruined olive and citrus crops as well as properties and villages along the Eurotas river. In the summer 2006, a fire devastated a part of the Mani Peninsula, ruining forests, crops, and numerous villages.

== Municipalities ==
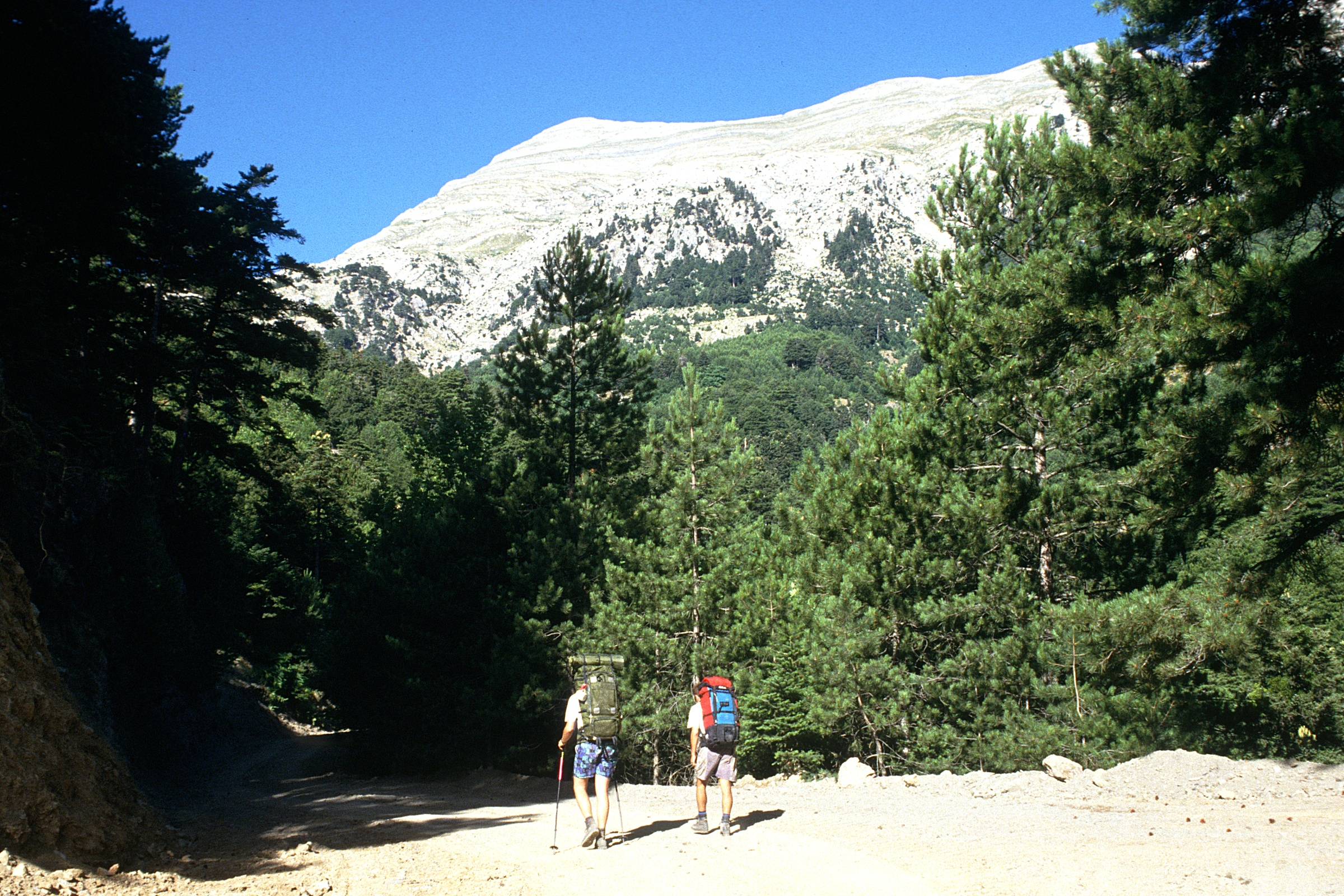
Taygetus

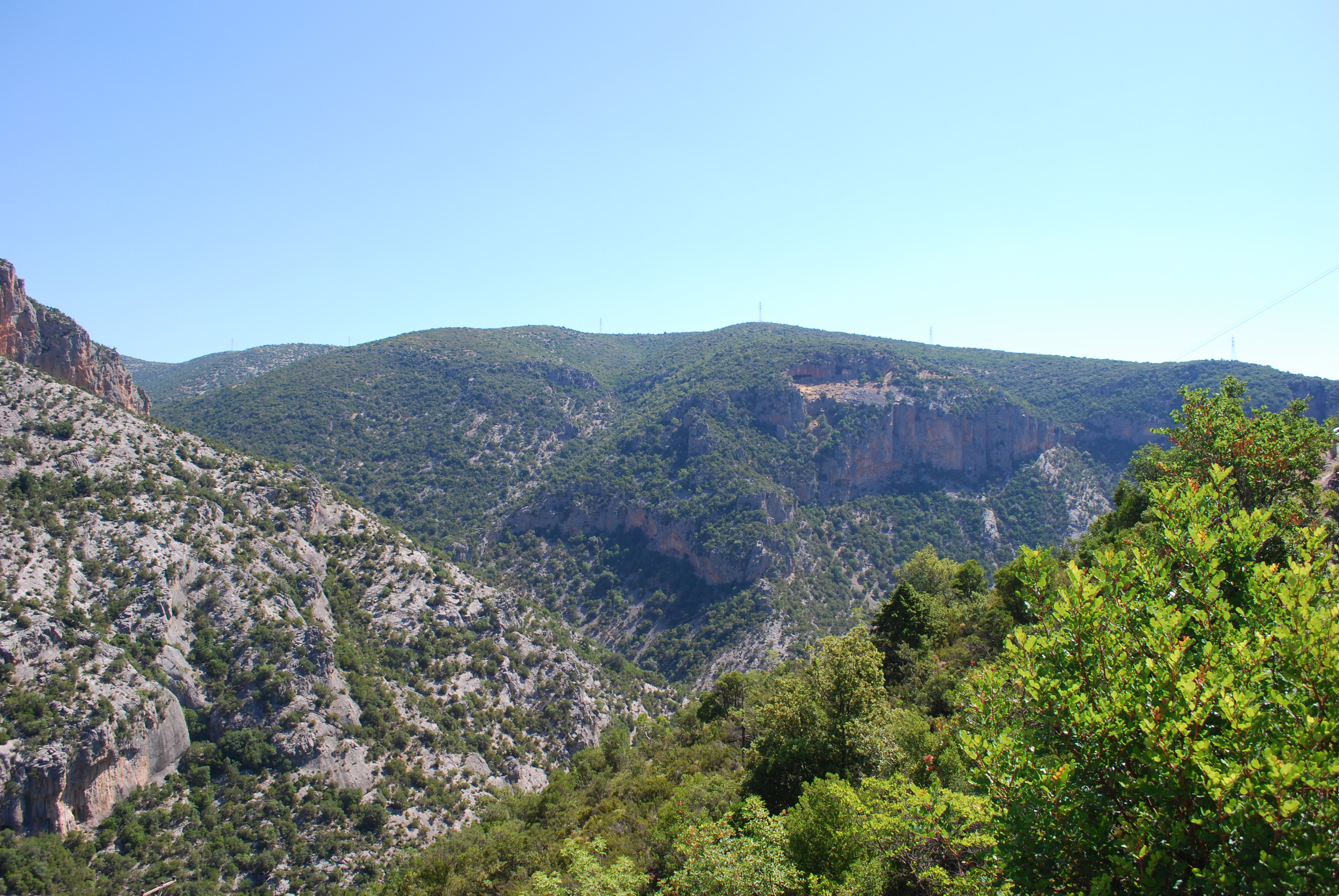
Parnon

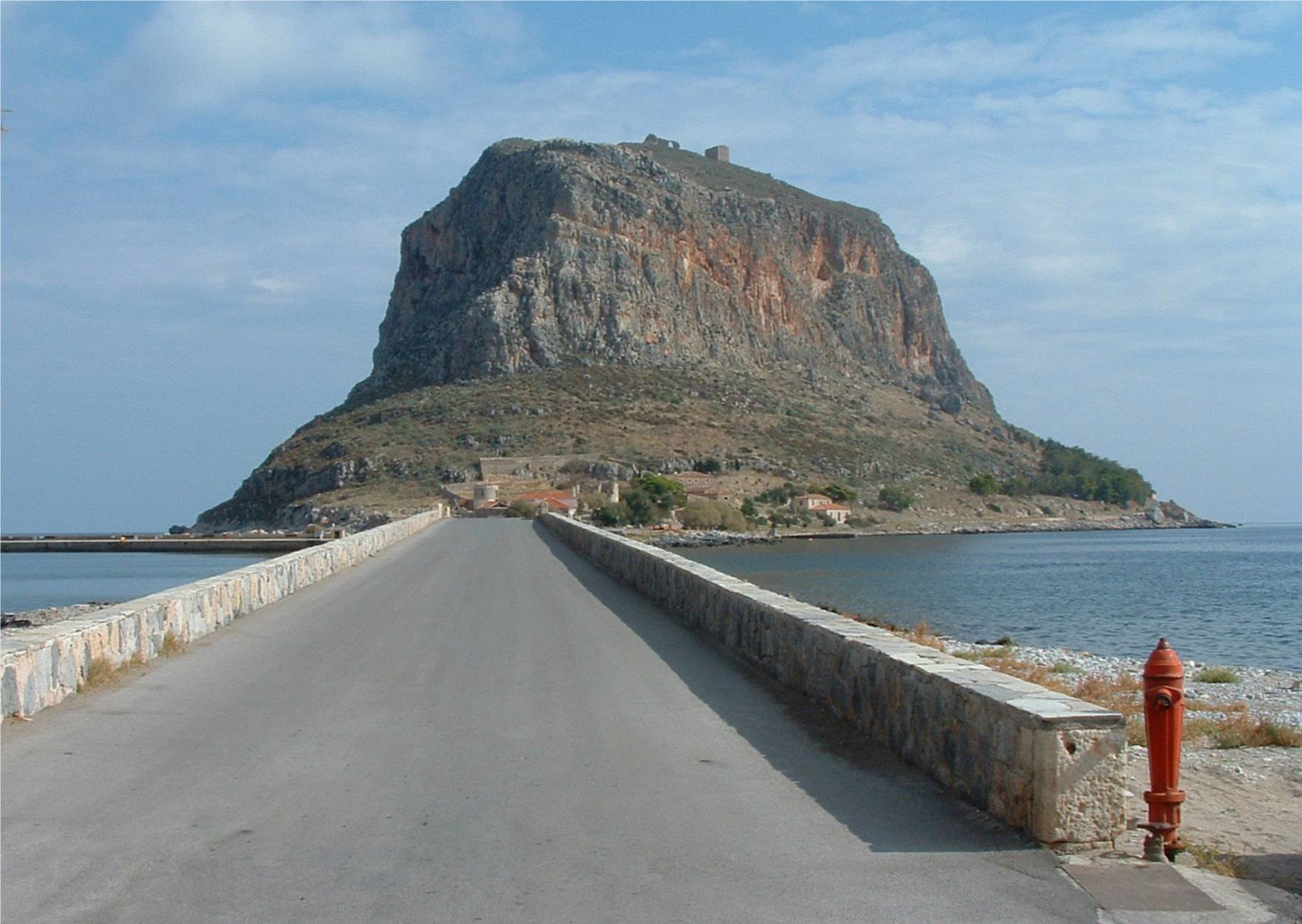
The rock of Monemvasia

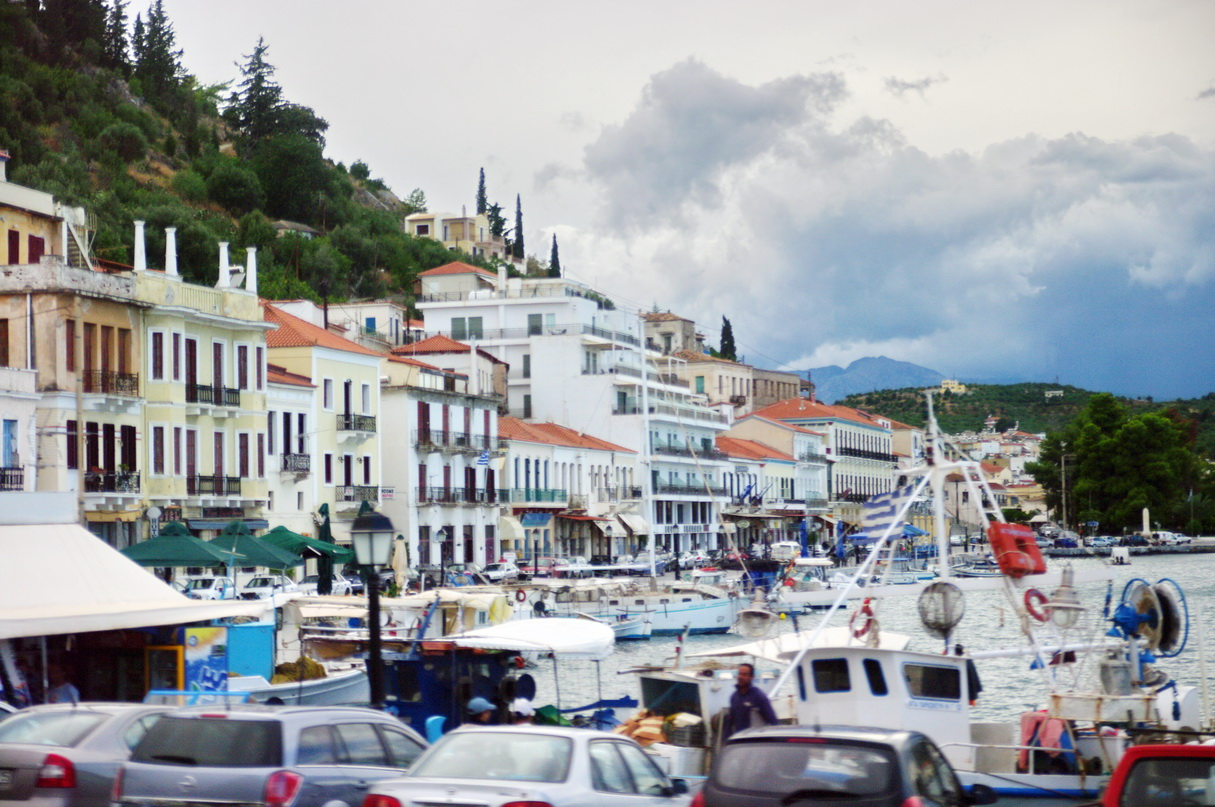
The port of Gytheio, Mani peninsula

The regional unit, Laconia, is subdivided into five municipalities. These are (number as in the map in the infobox):

- East Mani (Anatoliki Mani, 2)
- Elafonisos (3)
- Eurotas (4)
- Monemvasia (5)
- Sparta (1)

=== Prefecture ===
As a part of the 2011 Kallikratis government reform, regional unit Laconia was created out of the former prefecture Laconia (Greek: Νομός Λακωνίας). The prefecture had the same territory as the present regional unit. At the same time, the municipalities were reorganised, according to the table below.

New municipality	Old municipalities	Seat
East Mani (Anatoliki Mani)	East Mani	Gytheio
East Mani (Anatoliki Mani)	Gytheio	Gytheio
East Mani (Anatoliki Mani)	Oitylo	Gytheio
East Mani (Anatoliki Mani)	Sminos	Gytheio
Elafonisos	Elafonisos	Elafonisos
Eurotas	Skala	Skala
Eurotas	Geronthres	Skala
Eurotas	Elos	Skala
Eurotas	Krokees	Skala
Eurotas	Niata	Skala
Monemvasia	Monemvasia	Molaoi
Monemvasia	Asopos	Molaoi
Monemvasia	Voies	Molaoi
Monemvasia	Zarakas	Molaoi
Monemvasia	Molaoi	Molaoi
Sparti	Sparti	Sparti
Sparti	Therapnes	Sparti
Sparti	Karyes	Sparti
Sparti	Mystras	Sparti
Sparti	Oinountas	Sparti
Sparti	Pellana	Sparti
Sparti	Faris	Sparti

=== Provinces ===
- Epidavros Limira Province – Molaoi
- Gytheio Province – Gytheio
- Lacedaemonia Province – Sparti
- Oitylo Province – Areopoli

Note: Provinces no longer hold any legal status in Greece.

== Population ==
Historical population
Year	Pop.	±%
1907	87,106	—
1991	90,600	+4.0%
2001	92,811	+2.4%
2011	89,138	−4.0%
2021	84,337	−5.4%

The main cities and towns of Laconia are (ranked by 2021 census population):

- Sparta 16,782
- Gytheio 4,070
- Molaoi 2,850
- Skala 2,813
- Neapoli 2,715

== Transport ==
The A71 motorway is the only motorway in Laconia: the southern end is connected with a bypass around Sparta, which is part of European route E961. The national roads in the regional unit are the EO39, EO82, EO84 and EO86: there are also 37 numbered provincial roads.

== Communications ==
=== Radio ===
- FLY FM 89,7 (Sparta).
- POLITIA 90,7 – ΠΟΛΙΤΕΙΑ 90.7 (Sparta)
- Radio Sparti – 92.7 FM (Sparta)
- Radiofonias Notias Lakonias (Southern Laconia Radio) – 93.5 (Gytheio)
- Star FM – 94.7

=== Television ===
- Ellada TV – UHF 43, Sparta
- TV Notias Lakonias – Molaoi

=== Newspapers ===
- Λακωνικός Τύπος
- Ελεύθερη Άποψη
- Νέα Σπάρτη
- Παρατηρητής της Λακωνίας

== See also ==
- List of settlements in Laconia
- List of traditional Greek place names
- Laconic phrase
- Laconian (dog)
