= Siege of Monemvasia =

Siege of Monemvasia can refer to one of the sieges of the fortress city of Monemvasia (Malvasia) in southeastern Greece:

- Siege of Monemvasia (13th century), by the Principality of Achaea; the exact dating is disputed, with dates ranging from the early 1220s, to the late 1240s/early 1250s
- Siege of Monemvasia (1689–1690), by the Republic of Venice during the Morean War
- Siege of Monemvasia (1821), by the Greek rebels during the early stages of the Greek War of Independence
