= Monemvasia Mosque =

Former mosque, now museum, in Monemvasia, Greece

- Τζαμί Μονεμβασίας
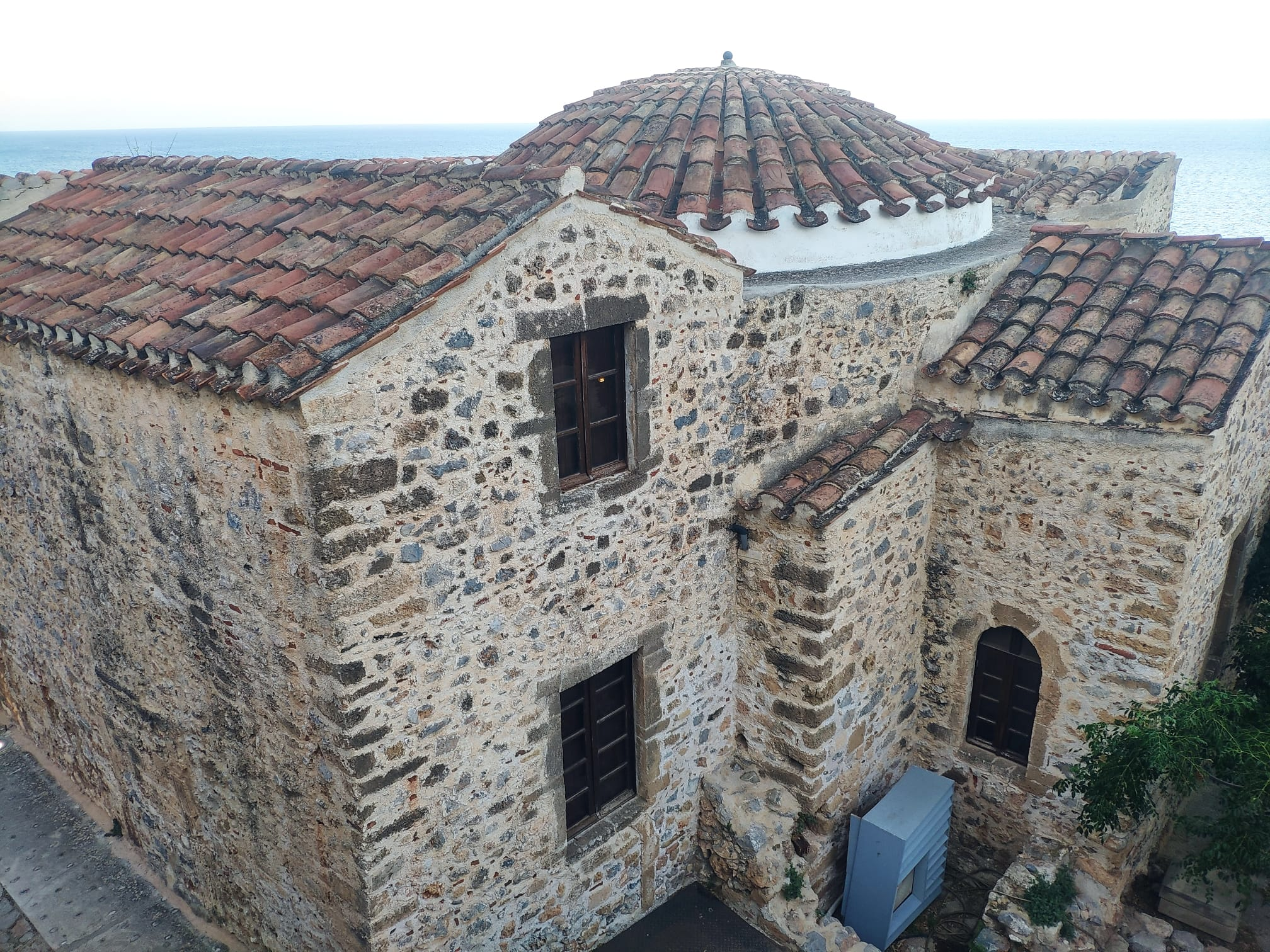

- Location of the former mosque in Greece

Religion
- Affiliation: Sunni Islam (former)
- Ecclesiastical or organizational status: Mosque (1540–1690); Profane use (1690–1715); Mosque (1715–1830)
- Status: Abandoned (as a mosque); Repurposed (as a history museum)

Location
- Location: Monemvasia, Laconia, Peloponnese
- Country: Greece
- Interactive map of Monemvasia Mosque
- Coordinates: 36°41′14″N 23°03′19″E

Architecture
- Type: Mosque
- Style: Ottoman
- Completed: 1540

Specifications
- Dome: 1
- Dome height (outer): 8.5 m (28 ft)
- Minaret: 1 (destroyed)
- Materials: Brick; stone

The Mosque of Monemvasia (Greek: Τζαμί Μονεμβασίας, Turkish: Benefşe Camii) is a former mosque located in the lower medieval town of Monemvasia, in the Peloponnese region of Greece. Built in 1540 during the Ottoman era, reportedly above a former 16th century church, the mosque was abandoned following Greek independence in 1830, and was subsequently briefly used as a prison. The restored former mosque has been repurposed as a history museum for the city's archaeological collection since 1999.

== History ==
In November 1540, the Ottomans took possession of Monemvasia, then ruled by the Republic of Venice. Soon after the conquest, a mosque was erected south of the central square of the lower town, opposite of the Metropolitan Church of Christos Elkomenos. According to the local tradition, the building was built on the site of a 16th-century Venetian church dedicated to Saint Peter, bishop of Monemvasia in the eighth century. However, no archaeological evidence seems to attest to an initial presence of a church in the current architecture of the crypts in the lower parts of the monument. According to historian Charis Kalliga, an unfinished Venetian loggia would more likely have preceded the mosque.

During the second Venetian rule of Monemvasia (1690–1715), the building was converted into a hospice, probably on the initiative of Capuchin monks, or perhaps into a church dedicated to Saint Anthony of Padua. It was reconverted to Muslim worship upon the second Ottoman domination (1715–1821), and then it became a prison upon the independence of Greece in 1830, as attested by the diplomat Thomas Wyse. At the beginning of the 20th century, when the architect and historian Ramsay Traquair visited Monemvasia, the place served as a café.

Since 1999, following restoration work, the old mosque has housed Monemvasia's archaeological collection as well as the offices of the 5th Ephorate of Byzantine Antiquities. In particular, marble remains of a 12th-century church, sculpted elements from the church of Hagia Sophia, ceramics and everyday objects from the early Christian period to the end of the Ottoman period are on display.

== Architecture ==
The architecture of the monument is nowadays difficult to decipher because of successive reconstructions and changes of use. The building currently has a square prayer hall with an interior side of 6.5 metres (21 ft), a rectangular extension to the west, while on the north side, a two-storey room now serves as a reception for visitors and a offices for the archaeological service. The mihrab and the porch are not preserved. The dome, originally 8.5 metres (28 ft) tall, rests on four squinches. The minaret, subsequently destroyed, once occupied the southwest corner.

== Gallery ==
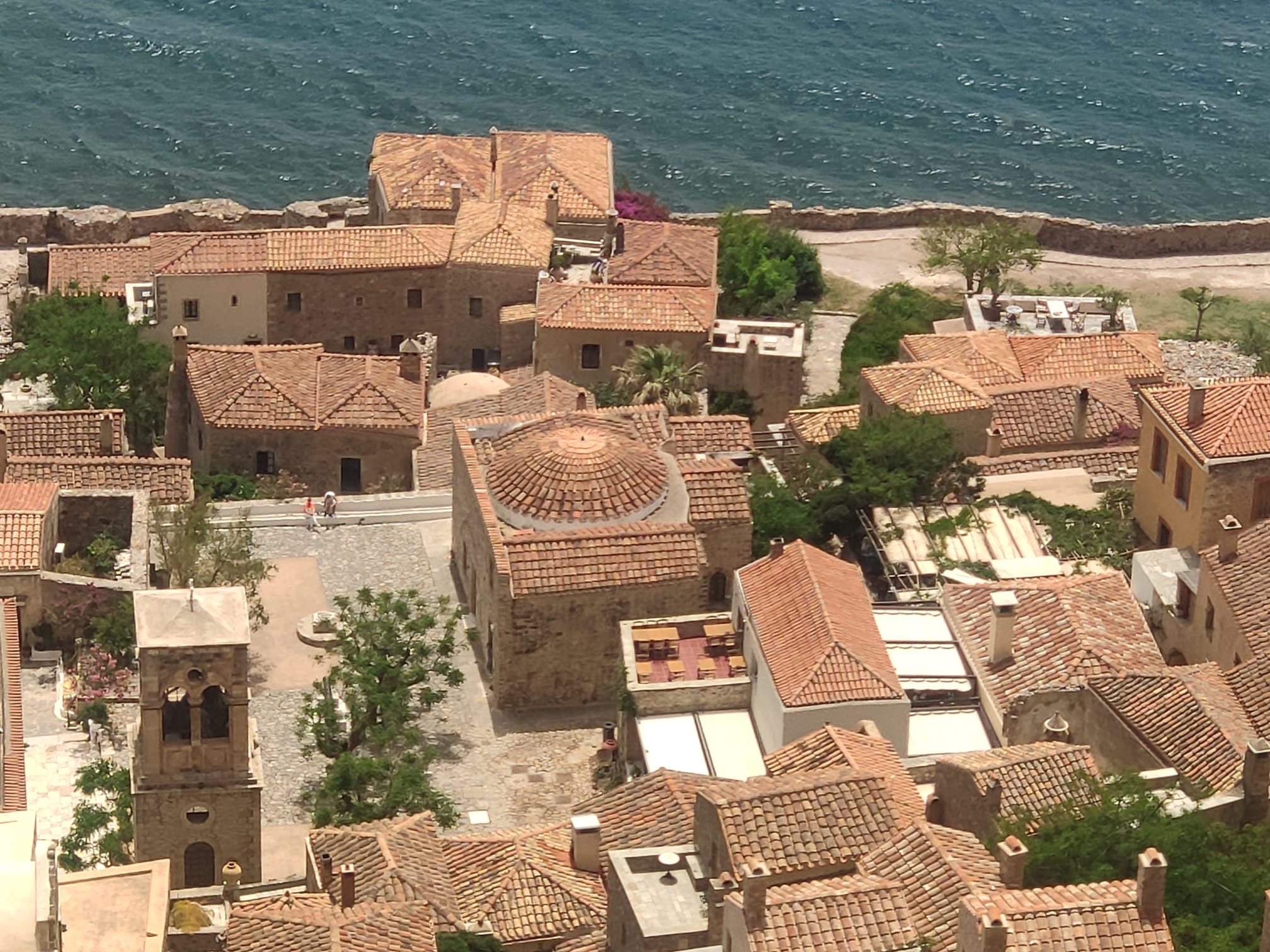
View of the former mosque from above

== See also ==
- Islam in Greece
- Ottoman Greece
- List of former mosques in Greece
- List of museums in Greece

== Bibliography ==
- Kalliga, Charis A. (2009). Monemvasia: A Byzantine City State. London: Routledge. ISBN 978-1-134-53603-0.
- Charalambous, Danae (2008). "Mosque of the Fortress of Monemvasia". In Brouskari, Erse (ed.). Ottoman architecture in Greece (in Greek). Translated by Elizabeth Key Fowden. Athens: Hellenic Ministry of Culture and Sports. ISBN 978-960-214-792-4.
