= Monemvasia =

Monemvasia Μονεμβασιά
- Municipality
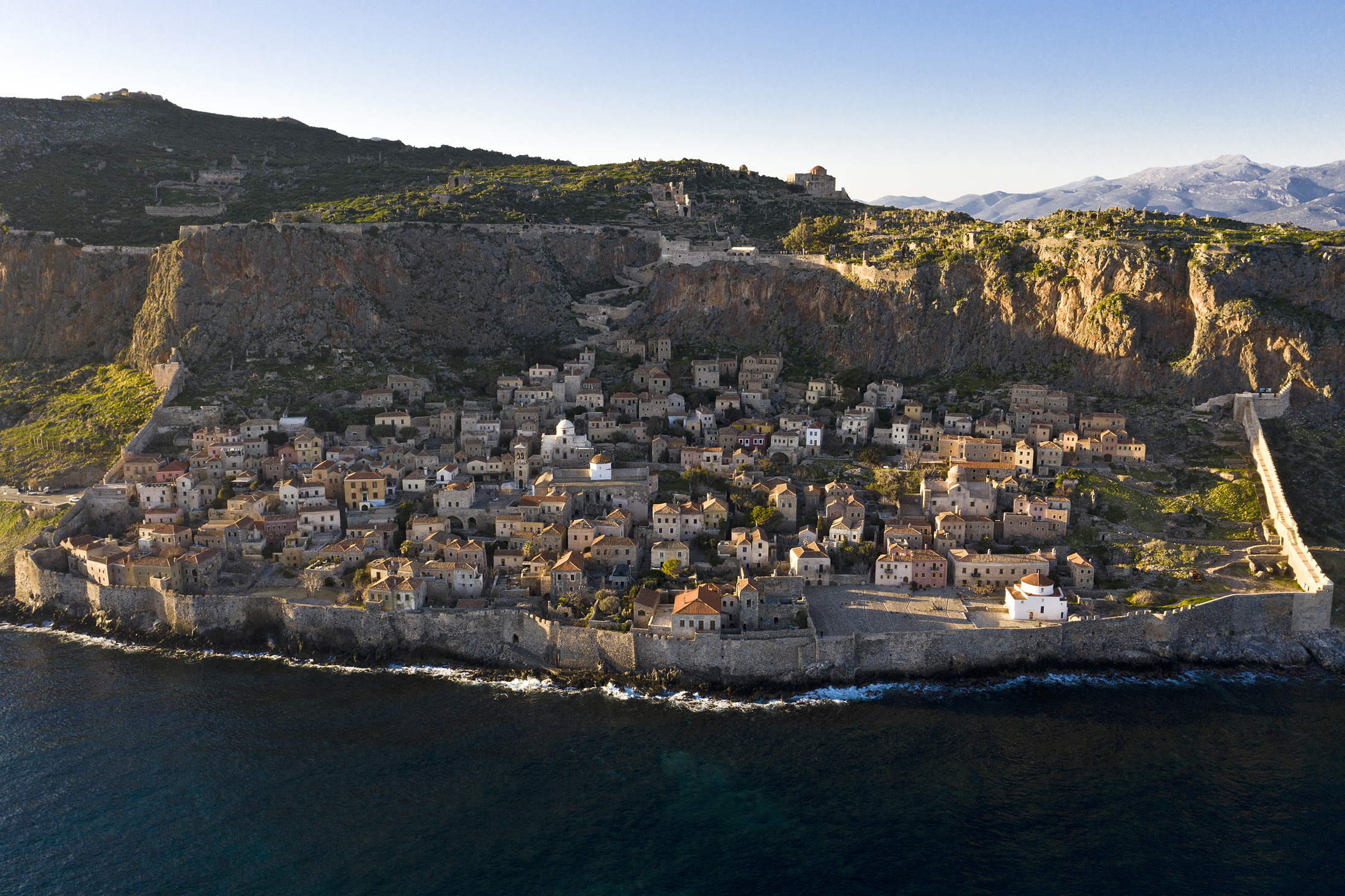
- View of Monemvasia's lower and upper towns from the south

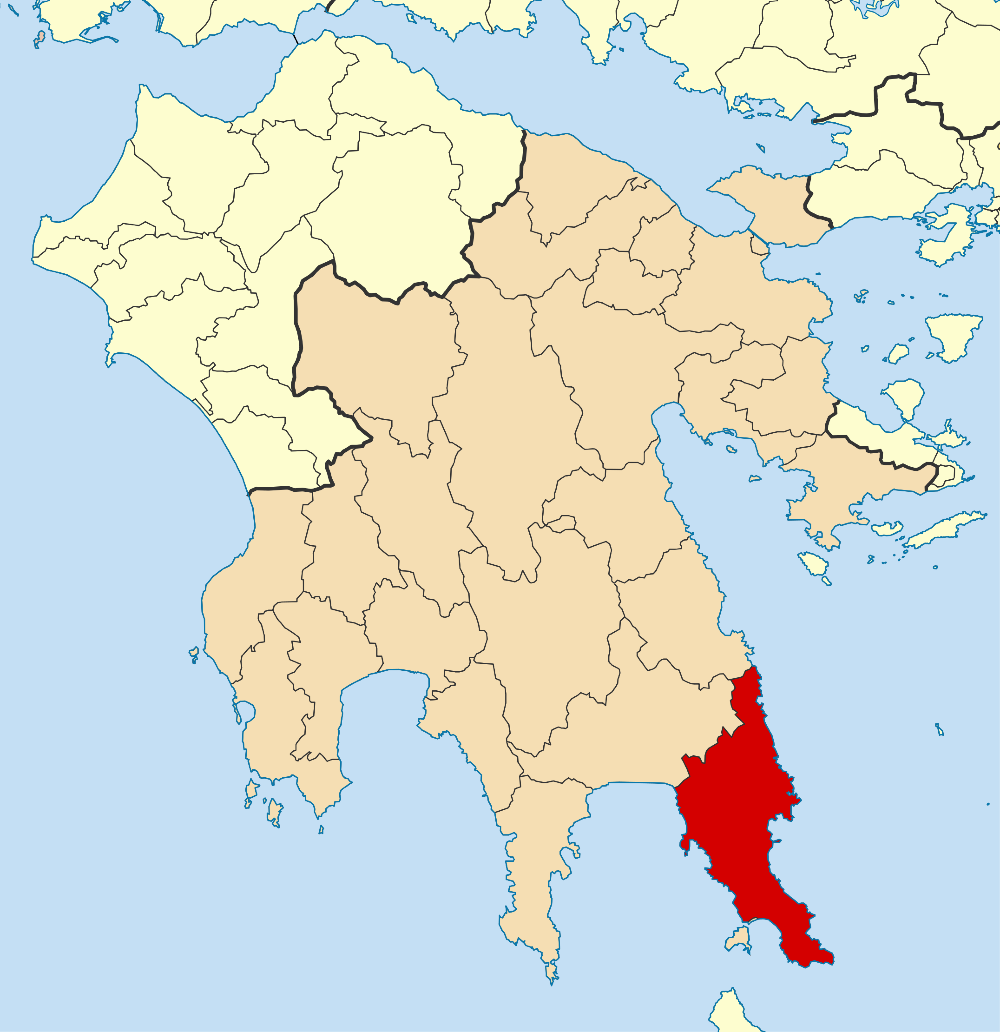

- Location within Greece
- Coordinates: 36°41′16″N 23°03′20″E
- Country: Greece
- Administrative region: Peloponnese
- Regional unit: Laconia

Area
  - Municipality: 949.3 km^{2} (366.5 sq mi)
  - Municipal unit: 209.0 km^{2} (80.7 sq mi)
- Elevation: 15 m (49 ft)

Population (2021)
  - Municipality: 21,816
  - Density: 22.98/km^{2} (59.52/sq mi)
  - Municipal unit: 4,114
  - Municipal unit density: 19.68/km^{2} (50.98/sq mi)
  - Community: 1,626
- Time zone: UTC+2 (EET)
  - Summer (DST): UTC+3 (EEST)
- Postal code: 230 70
- Area code: 27320
- Vehicle registration: ΑΚ

Monemvasia (Greek: Μονεμβασιά, Μονεμβασία, or Μονεμβάσια) is a town and municipality in Laconia, Greece. The town is located in mainland Greece on a tied island off the east coast of the Peloponnese, surrounded by the Myrtoan Sea. Monemvasia is connected to the rest of the mainland by a tombolo (sandy isthmus) 400 metres (1,300 ft) in length.

In 1890, a small part of the natural tombolo was cut to create an artificial bridge for ships and boats. Its area consists mostly of a large plateau some 100 m (330 ft) above sea level, up to 300 m (980 ft) wide and 1 kilometre (0.62 mi) long.

Founded in the sixth century, and thus one of the oldest continually-inhabited fortified towns in Europe, the town is the site of a once-powerful medieval fortress, and was at one point one of the most important commercial centres in the Eastern Mediterranean. The town's walls and many Byzantine churches remain as testaments to the town's history. Today, the seat of the municipality of Monemvasia is the town of Molaoi.

== Etymology ==
The town's name derives from two Greek words, moni (μόνη, 'single') and emvasis (έμβασις, 'approach'), together meaning city of the "single approach, or entrance". Its Italian form, Malvasia, gave its name to the eponymous wine. Monemvasia has been nicknamed "the Gibraltar of the East" (Γιβραλτάρ της ανατολής).

== History ==
=== Early history ===
The island on which the town of Monemvasia is situated may have been the site of a Minoan trading post. Pausanias, the renowned Greek traveler and geographer, referred to the site as Akra Minoa, which translates to "Minoan Promontory". The ancient settlement of Epidaurus Limera was located a little north of Monemvasia in ancient times. The region surrounding the two settlements has been inhabited since prehistoric times. During Roman times it flourished as the most important city on the eastern coast of the Malea peninsula.

Pausanias visited Epidaurus Limera and said that opposite the city there was a promontory which he referred to as the "extremity of Minos", which has been identified as Monemvasia. Strabo—a century earlier—mentions it as "Minoan fortress". The toponym "Minoa" indicates the existence of a port in antiquity, traces of which have been discovered underwater. However, it is not known if there was a significant settlement on the island. It is possible that a settlement was established there in the 4th century, around the time when the capital of the Roman Empire moved from Rome to Constantinople, which resulted in changes in maritime trade routes. Epidaurus Limera itself was abandoned in the 4th century.

=== Establishment ===
Monemvasia was founded in the 6th century from the relocation of the inhabitants of Ancient Sparta, which was then known as Lacedaemon. Sparta, unlike other cities that were abandoned, continued to be inhabited until the 6th century AD, despite earthquakes, Goth raids in 395 under Alaric I, Vandals in 468 under Gaiseric, and the plague epidemic of 541–543. According to the later Chronicle of Monemvasia, Sparta was abandoned after a Slav raid during the reign of Maurice in 587-588 when the city's inhabitants left in a panic, some fortifying themselves under the leadership of their bishop in Monemvasia and others settling in the passes of the region. However, archaeological findings do not support this, since the first level of the basilica church of Christ Elkomenos in the center of the lower town dates from the time of Justinian's reign a few decades earlier.

During Justinian's reign, natural disasters and raids led to the significant decline of many cities and Justinian proceeded with residential remodeling, moving entire populations to new locations and often changing city names. Such changes are mentioned by Procopius in On Buildings, though specific references to the Peloponnese are rare. The 15th-century text Report to the Patriarch, written by Isidoros, the metropolitan of Monemvasia, mentions that the movement of the populations took place under Justinian. Aipeia in Messenia, which moved to the current site of Koroni, is one city that was moved during this time period. Similarly, the location of Sparta was deemed insufficiently fortified and prone to long-term blockades due to its long distance from the port, and with the move of the capital to Constantinople, ships from Gytheion now had to sail around Cape Maleas. For these reasons, city authorities proceeded to move the population of Sparta, establishing Monemvasia, and reorganize the settlements of southeastern Laconia. The reorganization included settlement in the mountain passes of Parnon and migration from Gytheion, and the Chronicle of Monemvasia states that part of the population relocated as far away as Sicily. Because the rebuilding, moving, and settling of the population at the new location must have been completed several years later, it is likely that the two cities coexisted for some time. The seat of the diocese of Lacedaemonia was also moved, along with its inhabitants, though it kept its old name.

=== Byzantine period ===
Unlike other settlements in the Peloponnese region that saw their decline from the 7th century onwards—a period known as the Dark Ages—Monemvasia developed into a commercial and cultural centre due to its location on important sea routes like the one that connected it to Sicily. A bronze coin of Philippikos Bardanes minted in Sicily was found in the lower town. The oldest known mention of Monemvasia dates from the third decade of the 8th century by the pilgrim Vilibaldos, who traveled from Sicily to the Holy Land with a stopover in Monemvasia. Monemvasia is also mentioned by Theophanes the Confessor, who describes the arrival of the plague in Byzantium in 746-747.

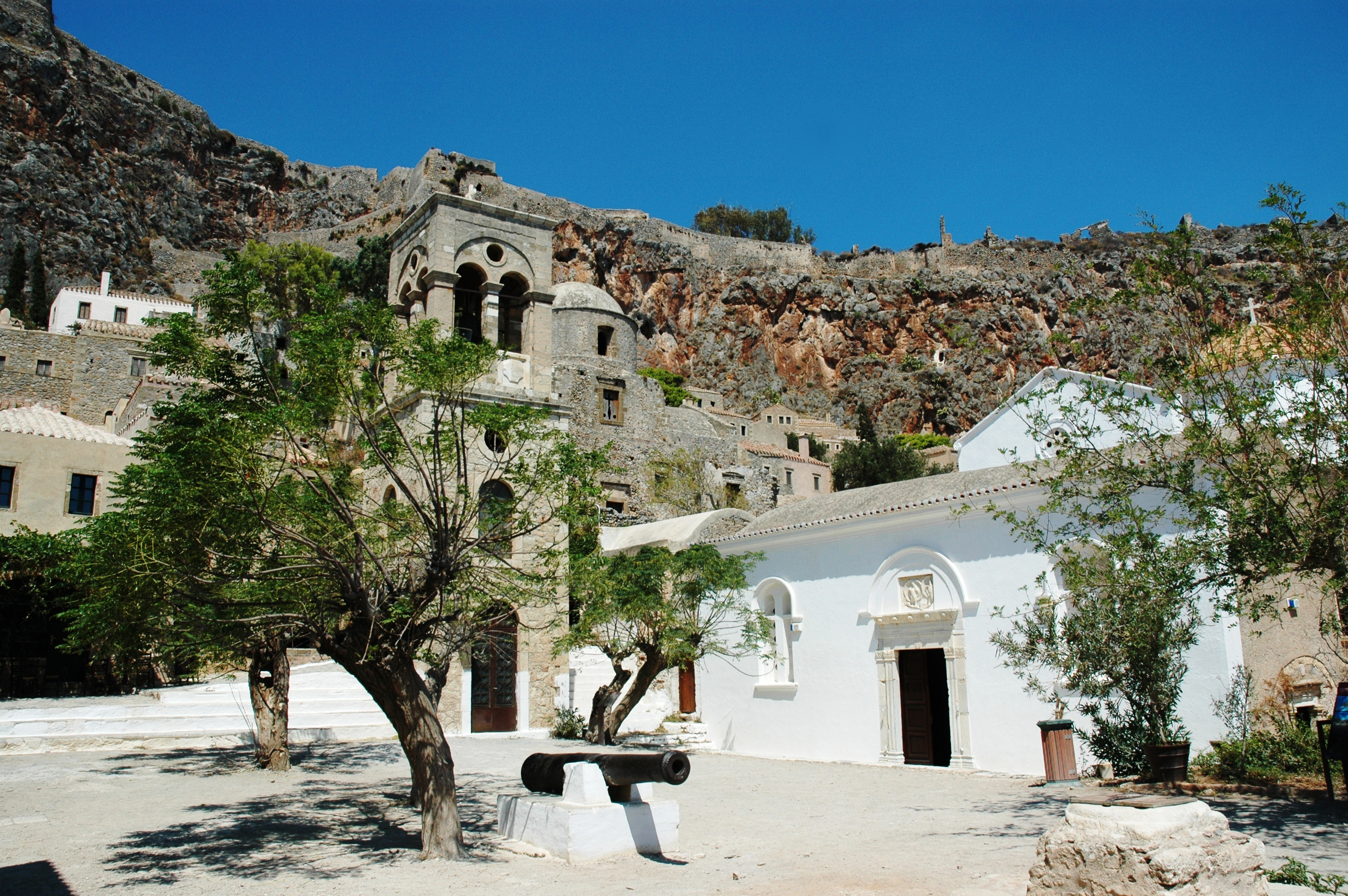
The central square of Monemvasia, with the Byzantine church of Christ Elkomenos.

Monemvasia's key position on the sea route to the eastern Mediterranean made it the target of pirate raids in the following centuries, along with raids by Western rulers. Arab raids began in the 9th century, and after their settlement in Crete the raids multiplied. One such raid is mentioned in the 10th-century Psychophile Narratives of bishop Pavlos Monemvasias, which now survive only in an Arabic translation. In one of them, it is mentioned that the Arabs attacked the fortress of Vukolo, which has been identified as Monemvasia. Earlier in the same text it is mentioned that the relics of the saints of Barcelona, such as Bishops Valerius, Eulalia and Vincentius, among others, washed up in the city. The inhabitants collected the sarcophagi that contained them and built a church on the steep hill. During the reign of Emperors Leo VI and Alexander, the chapel was located and the remains were transferred to the chapel of Agia Irini next to the church of Agia Anastasia, which today is dedicated to Christ Elkomenos.

At the beginning of the 10th century, the ecclesiastical seat of Monemvasia was transferred from the jurisdiction of the church of Rome to the patriarchate of Constantinople, where it was demoted to the diocese of Corinth. Despite this, Monemvasia continued to develop and maintain many privileges, among which was self-government.

During the 11th and 12th centuries, Monemvasia experienced significant economic growth. During that period, the settlement spread around the island from the main side and key monuments were rebuilt, such as the church of Hagia Sophia (originally dedicated to Panagia Hodegetria) in the upper town and the church of Elkomenos Christos. At the time of the Komnenians, Monemvasia had evolved into a guardian of the western entrance to the Aegean. In 1147, ships of the Sicilian king Roger II tried to capture the city without success, being forced to withdraw with heavy losses. Theodoros Mavrosomis, the archon of Monemvasia at that time, then settled in the imperial court, and after the Battle of Myriokephalos he was put in charge of the left wing of the army and was given the position of mediator.

The Latin Empire, a 13th-century crusader state, unsuccessfully attempted to besiege Monemvasia in 1222. In 1225, after a three-year siege, the Frankish prince of Achaia, William of Villehardouin, successfully occupied Monemvasia. The inhabitants who did not wish to remain under Latin occupation left for Bithynia, which acquired many of the same commercial privileges as Monemvasia. Monemvasia itself retained the same privileges it previously had, along with an obligation to maintain the ships, and became the seat of a Latin bishop. Monemvasia's loss was a serious blow to the emperor of Nicaea, Michael VIII Palaiologos, since it ruined his plans for the recovery of the lands that had fallen to the Franks., so when William was captured by the Byzantines at the Battle of Pelagonia in 1259 and refused to cede his possessions in the Peloponnese in exchange for his release, Michael kept him prisoner until 1262, when he agreed to surrender the castles of Monemvasia, Mystras, Grand Magne, and Geraki to the Byzantines. Monemvasia was designated the seat of a Byzantine general and an Orthodox metropolitan and important privileges were granted to the inhabitants. These privileges were renewed and expanded by Andronikos II Palaiologos (1282-1328), including exemptions from inheritance taxes and duties, then Andronikos III Paleologos later exempted Monemvasia from 28 taxes.

The prosperity of the city was rapid. In addition to an increase in population and the accompanying increase in trade and shipping, spiritual and ecclesiastical development occurred to the extent that the period up to 1460 is considered the city's "golden age". This prosperity attracted Roger of Lauria, who sacked the lower town in 1292. In 1302, the town welcomed the Catalan Company on its way eastward. In 1324, out of a total of 3,108 pyres that the metropolitans contributed to the Constantinople Patriarchate, 800 came from the Monemvasia metropolis, more than any other. In 1347 or 1348, John VI Kantakouzenos promoted the metropolis of Monemvasia to the hierarchy of the Patriarchate of Jerusalem. The peaceful life of Monemvasia during the 14th and the first half of the 15th century was disturbed by pirate raids and internal conflicts, though its historical course under the Despotate of the Morea was not affected.

In 1354, control over the Despotate of Morea was usurped by Manuel Kantakouzinos, who remained in power until 1380. The administration of Monemvasia was given to Ioannis Kantakouzinos, who rebelled after learning that Theodore Palaiologos would be appointed after Manuel's death. Theodore tried to approach Monemvasia but was driven away and fled to Venetian-occupied Koroni to ask for help in exchange for the territory of Monemvasia. The Monemvasians repudiated the rebels and in 1394, Theodore was captured by Ottoman Sultan Bayezid I. In order to free himself, he asked for the surrender of Monemvasia. Theodore managed to escape, and with the help of Venice, recaptured Monemvasia from the Ottomans in July 1394. Because of the unrest caused by these events, the city's population decreased and commercial traffic was effectively brought to a halt. After the fall of Constantinople in 1453, unrest prevailed in the Despotate. The two despots at that time, Thomas Palaiologos and Demetrios Palaiologos, disagreed about the future of the despotate. Eventually, Dimitrios surrendered Monemvasia to Mehmed II in May 1460. However, Mehmed withdrew without besieging the city. Then, on September 12, 1460, following the advice of Thomas, the inhabitants offered the city to Pope Pius II, who accepted.

=== First Venetian rule and first Ottoman rule ===
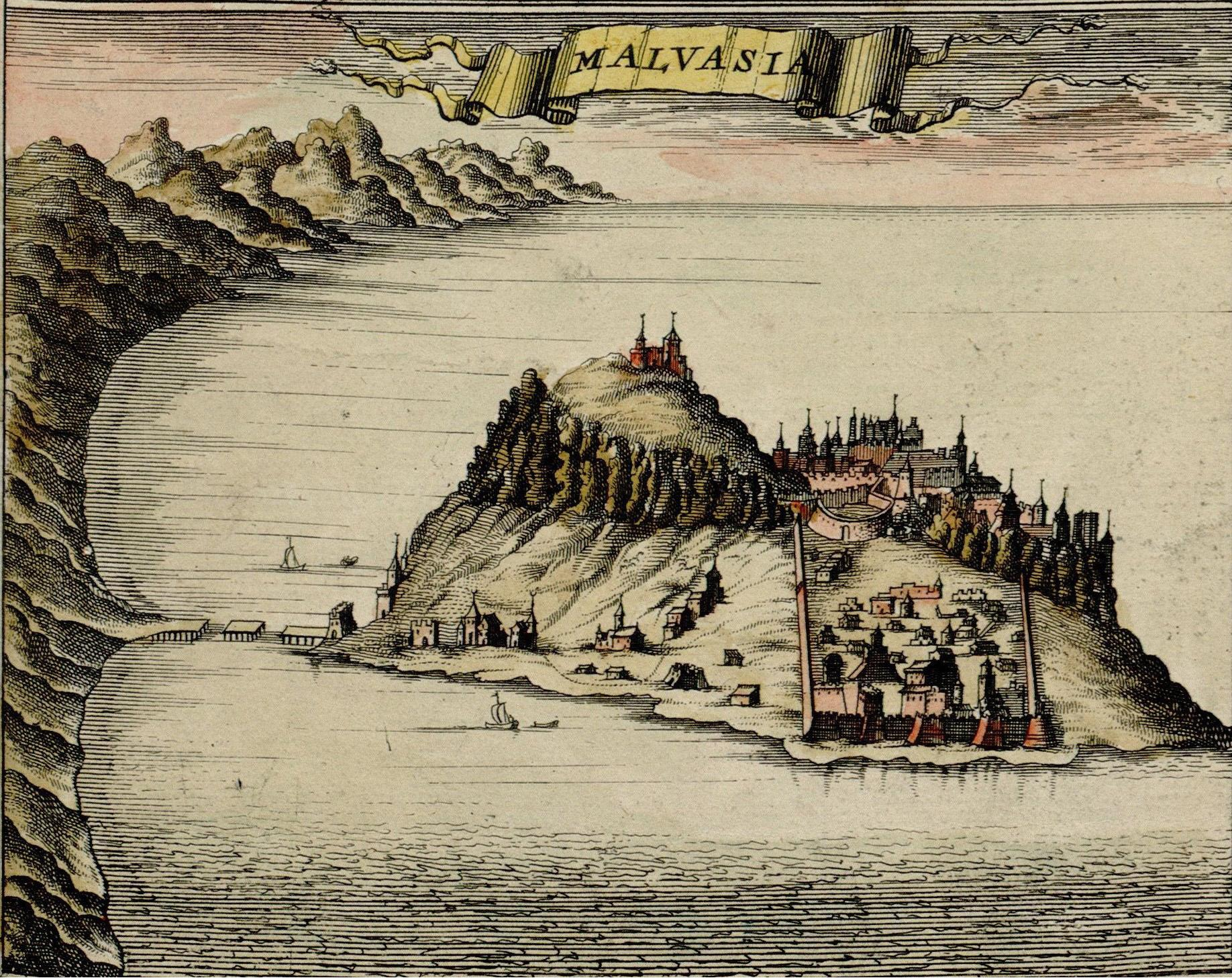
Map made by F. de Witt, Amsterdam, 1680.

In 1460, Sultan Mehmed II arrived in Corinth, then proceeded to Laconia and captured the fortresses of Achaia and Ilia. In July 1461, Salmenikos, the last castle of the Greek despot, was surrendered. Apart from the Venetian possessions of the Peloponnese and Monemvasia that had been granted with the consent of the Despot of Morea Thomas Palaiologos to Pope Pius II, the Ottoman conquest of this critical region for Byzantium was now complete. By the end of 1463, Monemvasia had fully fallen to the Venetians. After the end of the First Ottoman-Venetian War (1463–1479), part of the lands in the territory of Monemvasia came under the possession of the Ottomans, affecting the island's agricultural production and trade. Venice's possessions around Monemvasia became more limited after the Second Ottoman-Venetian War (1499–1503).

In 1537, Hayreddin Barbarossa began attempts to capture Nafplio and Monemvasia, the two remaining Venetian possessions in the Peloponnese. In the peace treaty, Sultan Suleiman I requested, as compensation for the damages suffered by his fleet, the concession of islands he had conquered along with Nafplio and Monemvasia. Despite the Venetians' reactions, the treaty was signed on October 2, 1540, and the two cities surrendered to the Turks. Most of its inhabitants then abandoned it and took refuge in the nearest Venetian-occupied islands, mainly in Corfu and Crete.

During the Ottoman times, the upper town of Monemvasia was abandoned. Monemvasia itself became known as Menexe (Μενεξέ), Menefse (Μενεφσέ), or Benefse (Μπενεφσέ) in Greek and Menekşe in Turkish (all meaning 'violet'). It was administratively included in the Eyalet of the Morea. In the census of 1573-1574, it was mentioned that the town had a garrison of 104 men and paid 28,665 akçes in taxes, 6,000 of which came from the commercial traffic in its port. Due to information that there was a small garrison in Monemvasia, Jean Parisot de La Valette, the Grand Master of the Order of Malta, decided to obtain the city to serve as a base in the Aegean. At the end of September 1564, he sent galleys to capture it, but the old, unguarded path leading to the upper town could not be located and they withdrew. This path was sealed by the Ottomans sometime later with a wall. In 1583 there were 320 non-Muslim families and 191 residents without a family.

During the Cretan War (1645–1669), attempts were made by Venice to capture Monemvasia, which served as a base for the Ottoman army. The first attempt was made in August 1653, during which the Venetians managed to capture a fort outside the lower town but then abandoned the attempt as attacks on the lower town failed. The second attempt was made in July 1655, with the Venetians proceeding to blockade Monemvasia. As the Ottomans sent reinforcements, however, they eventually withdrew. Subsequently, the Ottomans strengthened the defense of the island and granted its inhabitants the right to build a church with a dome as a reward for not ceding the city to the Venetians.

=== Venetian recapture and second Ottoman rule ===
In 1684, the Sixth Ottoman–Venetian War began, during which Francesco Morosini occupied the entire Peloponnese, with the exception of Monemvasia, which resisted. Morosini besieged it again in 1687, bombarding it, but the Turkish defenders refused to surrender and he withdrew. Many Turks who fled from the rest of Moria took refuge in the city. In 1688 he proposed to build a fortress opposite Monemvasia. Finally in July 1689 the construction of two forts began and the siege began again, but it was again unsuccessful and at the end of September it was withdrawn. At the end of the following spring the siege was resumed, led by Girolamo Corner and despite setbacks, the city surrendered and Corner entered on 12 August 1690.

The recovery of the Peloponnese from the Venetians also resulted in the resettlement of residents in Monemvasia, which was designated as the capital of the department of Laconia. The city had suffered significant damage and began a program of reconstruction. Its population in 1700 had reached 1,622 inhabitants, almost double the count of ten years prior.

In 1715, the Ottoman Empire army attacked the Peloponnese, in the context of the Seventh Ottoman–Venetian War (1714–1718). The Ottoman fleet arrived at Monemvasia on 3 August 1715, demanding the city's surrender. The city's council of war asked for a 20-day extension to learn the intentions of the Venetian fleet, which was granted. The fleet did not approach Monemvasia and the city finally surrendered on September 7, 1715. Some of the inhabitants were sold as slaves as part of the surrender treaty. Others fled to other Venetian-occupied areas. After the Ottoman recovery, Monemvasia remained under the jurisdiction of Kapudan Pasha. The area experienced a relative commercial and economic boom and a Greek school was established. Some Venetians returned to the city, as did former Turkish residents.

During the Orlov revolt (1770), the Metropolitan of Monemvasia, Anthimos the Lesvios, armed a body of Monemvasians and blocked the Ottomans in the fortress, but when the besiegers were attacked by the Albanians, they dispersed and many were captured or killed and the city was looted. After the revolt, the area was abandoned by a large part of its population.

=== During the War of Independence ===
During the Siege of Monemvasia beginning on March 15, 1821, at the beginning of the Greek War of Independence, the fortress of Monemvasia was besieged by land and sea. After a four-month siege, it was surrendered to the Greeks on July 23, 1821. Disputes over the distribution of spoils and administration ensued, leading to anarchy.

In March 1822, it was decided by the temporary administration of Greece to repair the fortress and send a guard, but to no avail, the result of which was that the situation in the fortress worsened. Later, the fortress and the province of Monemvasia fell victim to the civil war. The Maniots led by Konstantinos Mavromichalis began to besiege the fortress in September 1823. By March 1824, half the villages of the province had passed into the possession of the Maniots, and while they continued to besiege the fortress, the central administration decided to transfer three to four cannons from Monemvasia to Spetses. Cretans and Psarans arrived at the fortress after the destruction of Psara, but the siege of the fortress continued.

In January 1827, Dimitris Plapoutas arrived at the fortress with 200 soldiers and the inhabitants and the governors of Monemvasia agreed to hand over the administration of the castle to him so that the fortress could be liberated, as was done by the decision of the National Assembly on 1 March 1827. However, Mavromichalis continued to try to conquer the fortress, as a result of which Plapoutas withdrew, not accepting this behavior, and eventually Mavromichalis was placed in charge of the castle. These constant quarrels prevented Monemvasia from being able to play an important role in the later developments regarding the establishment of the Greek state.

=== Post-Independence ===
According to the 1828 Census, Monemvasia was home to just 659 inhabitants, with most of the houses having been destroyed in the war. Konstantinos Kanaris was appointed as the new guardian of Monemvasia. Among the issues he faced were guarding the fortress and repairing the buildings, as they were not in sufficient shape to house necessary public services. For this reason the engineers Fotis Kesoglou and Theodoros Vallianos arrived in the town. At the same time, an effort was made to operate a school, which was housed in the church of Agios Nikolaos. Despite difficulties in financing it, it remained in operation in 1937. Ecclesiastically, Monemvasia remained the seat of the metropolis of Monemvasia, but after the death of Metropolitan Chrysantho Pagonis, the seat remained unoccupied and Gerasimos Pagonis was appointed as vicar.

Monemvasia continued to be in a dire situation for many more years, but it remained the largest village in the region and during the administrative reorganization of 1833. Monemvasia continued to be the seat of the province, which was renamed from the province of Monemvasia to the province of Epidaurus Limiras. Monemvasia remained the seat of the province until 1864, when the seat was transferred to Molaoi, but it remained the seat of a municipality, until its abolition in 1913. At the beginning of the 20th century, it was the seat of a court of justice, customs office, telegraph office, police, and school authority. According to the censuses, there was a population decline until the 1970s. The community's population trend according to the censuses is as follows: 1920: 483, 1928: 638, 1940: 638, 1951: 522, 1961: 487, 1971: 445. Generally, the inhabitants of Monemvasia either immigrated to Athens or moved to Gefyra, opposite Monemvasia. In the 1951 census, of the community's 522 residents, 261 lived in Gefyra, 178 in the old town, and 83 in Agia Kyriaki. The population of the old town continued to decline, and in 1971 only 32 residents lived in it. Monemvasia continued to rely on cisterns for its water supply until 1964 and electricity arrived in 1972. Trade was carried out by coastal shipping, where products were transported to the nearest major port, Piraeus.

=== Recent years ===
Starting in the 1970s, Monemvasia began to flourish again, this time as a tourist destination. The people of Monemvasia sold their houses to people visiting Monemvasia, who restored them. Alexandros and Harris Kalliga played a key role in the restorations. At the same time, Gefyra also experienced strong growth (in the 2011 census it has 1,299 inhabitants).

In 1971, Monemvasia became linked with the rest of the country through a bridge on the western side that connects to the EO86 road.

In more recent history, the town has seen a resurgence in importance, with increasing numbers of tourists visiting the site and the region. The medieval buildings have been restored, and many of them converted to hotels.

For the past few years, on July 23 an independence day celebration has been held in the main port. Speeches are made and the story of Tzannetakis Grigorakis and his men is recounted in both Greek and English. Inhabitants and visitors can gather to watch as a ship, built every year, is filled with pyrotechnics and set on fire.

The 1986 horror movie The Wind was filmed here.

== Municipality ==
The municipality of Monemvasia was formed from the former province of Epidavros Limira during the 2011 administrative reform as a part of the Kallikratis Programme. It was formed through the merger of the following 5 former municipalities, which thereby became municipal units:

- Asopos
- Molaoi
- Monemvasia
- Voies
- Zarakas

The municipality has an area of 949.3 square kilometres (366.5 sq mi), the municipal unit an area of 209.0 square kilometres (80.7 sq mi).

== Historical population ==
Year	Community	Municipal unit	Municipality
1981	707	-	-
2001	1,405	4,660	-
2011	1,299	4,041	21,942
2021	1,626	4,114	21,816

== Malvasia Wine ==
Monemvasia's trade in wine was so extensive throughout its history, especially under Venetian administration, that the name of the place became familiar throughout Europe in connotation with the variety of wine called Malvasia, 'Malmsey' in English. Though the wine was associated with Monemvasia through trade, it was not grown locally, coming for the most part from the Peloponnese region and islands in the Cyclades, especially Tinos. The variety of grape is believed by most ampelographers, however, to originate in Crete.

== Outline of town ==
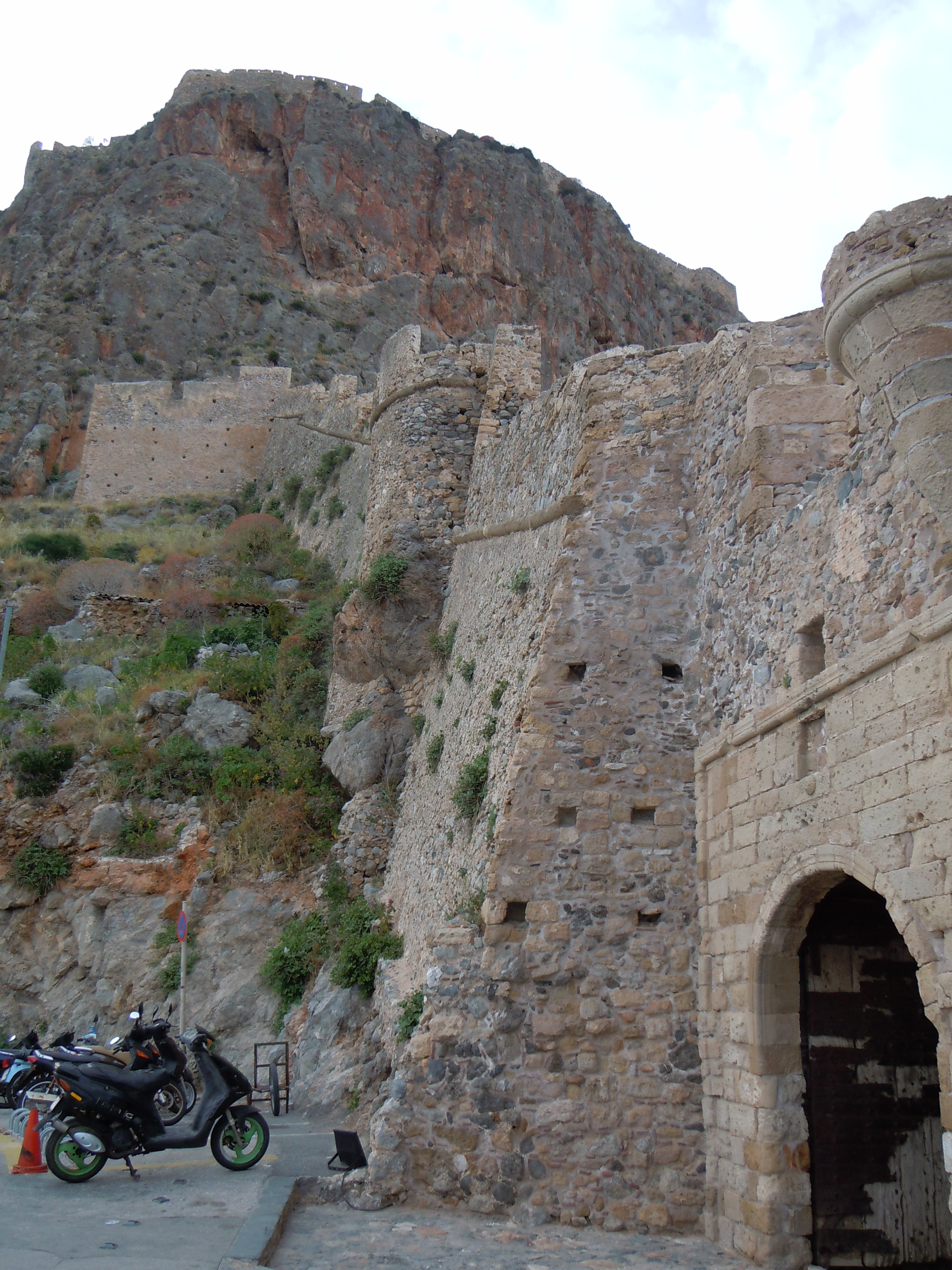
The western wall of the lower town.

Monemvasia consists of the upper town, which is located on the plateau of the hill, and the lower town, which is built on the southern coast of the peninsula. The upper town is no longer inhabited, as it was abandoned after the second Venetian occupation. The entrance to the upper town today is through a fortified gate to which a winding path ascends from the lower town. A second entrance used to be on the north side, but was sealed during the first occupation by the Ottoman Empire. In the upper town was the acropolis of Monemvasia, a rectangular fortress with four towers, which was built in the 6th century, houses and public buildings, such as churches, cisterns and administrative buildings. The church of Hagia Sophia stands out among them. The layout of the settlement is no longer distinct.

The lower town is located under the southern wall of the upper town. It is walled on three sides: east, south, and west. Entry is through the west gate, which is connected by a road to the bridge over the causeway. The street continues inside the city and forms the main street of the lower town, which was known as the Middle Street (Μέση Οδός) in the Byzantine period. The area surrounding it was known as the "Agora" and along it are shops. This road intersects with the road that descends from the upper town and leads to the gate in the sea walls known as the "portello" (πορτέλλο). At the point where these two roads cross is Elekmenos Christos square, where the metropolitan church, the former mosque, and the episcopal palace—official residence of the bishop—are located. In the 19th century, two more squares were created, the Megali (Μεγάλη) and Mikri Tapia (Μικρή Τάπια). The rest of the streets of the lower town are narrow cobblestones, sometimes covered with vaulted structures known as dromi, over which sections of houses were built.

=== Fortifications ===
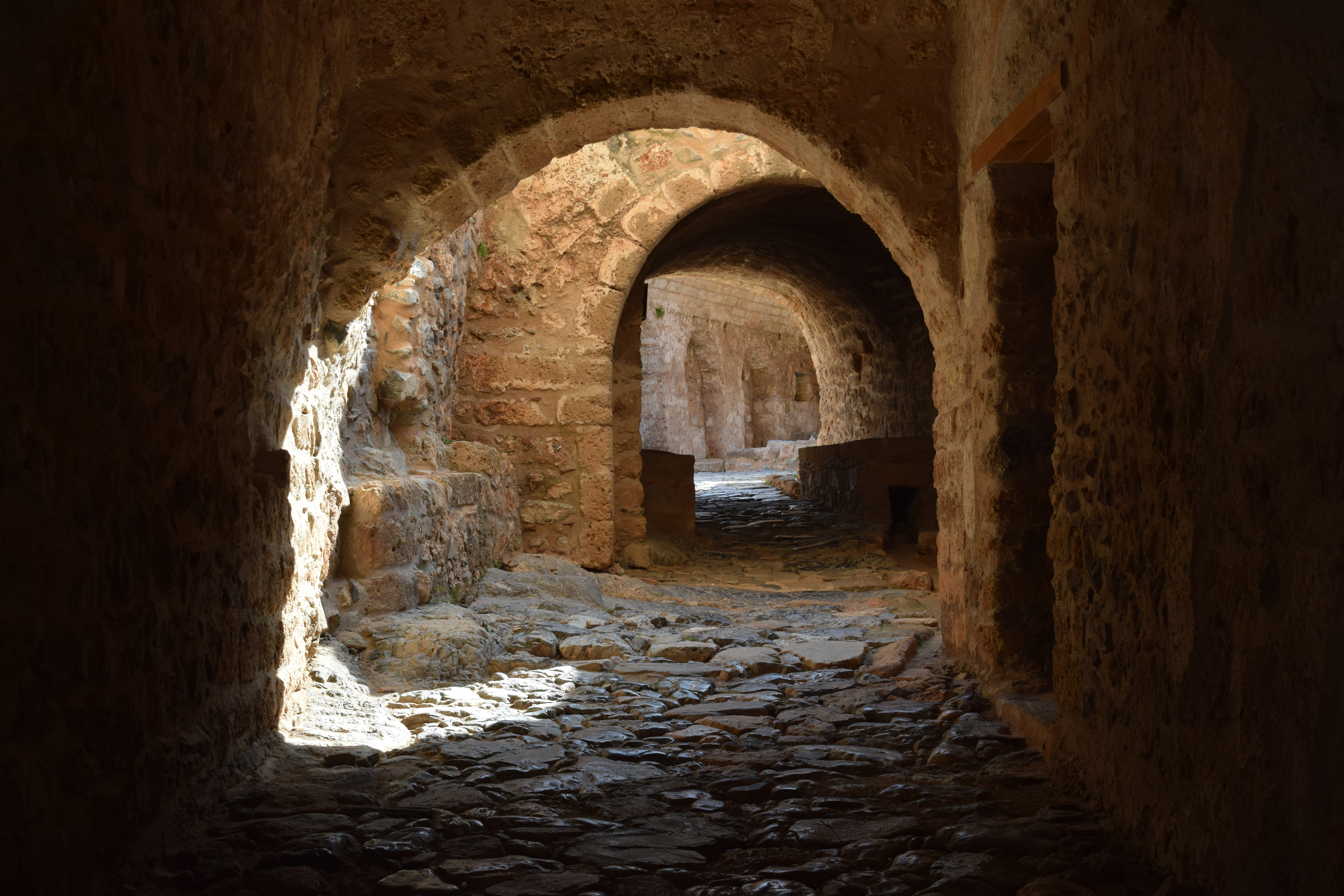
Walkway in the upper town.

At the highest point of the rock of Monemvasia was the acropolis. This fortress consisted of an enclosure with four towers at each corner. Entrance was made through a gate in the eastern wall. The walls were made of 'mudstone' with a fortified mortar. In the place of the southwestern tower, a rectangular powder magazine was built during the second Venetian period. Remains of buildings are preserved inside the fort. One of the buildings near the center had a cistern. There are indications that on the eastern side of the fort there was a large hall, on the southern wall of which the monogram of Theodore Palaiologos was found. The fortress seems to have been abandoned during the first Venetian rule.

The rest of the upper town is protected by a fortified enclosure on the north and south sides of the hill, while the other sides were not fortified as they were steep and thus naturally fortified. A road with parapets in places, which had battlements and lookouts, was built around the cliff to avoid the risk of falling. The fortification of the upper town is known as Goulas (Γουλάς) and was built during the Byzantine period, although now the greater part of the walls date from the Venetian and Ottoman times. The walls are more reinforced in the section where the south gate is located, in the section above the west gate of the lower town and at the eastern end. To the gate of the upper town leads from the lower town a winding cobblestone with two intermediate gates. The gate in Byzantine times was vaulted and had a square tower above it.

During Ottoman times, vaulted rooms were built near the gate, one of which was a mosque. To the west there is a small bastion. The western wall of the upper town oversaw the main gate of the lower town. It had two towers. This wall was strengthened by the Ottomans so that it could face the artillery with a double bastion to the east. On the eastern edge of the north wall there was also a fort, which was rebuilt in 1540 by Kasım Pasha, but was destroyed when his gunpowder magazine exploded after being bombarded by the Venetians. The castle also had a gate on the north wall, but this was sealed during the 1st Ottoman Empire with a wall which the Venetians called Mura Rossa ('Red Wall'). The Venetians strengthened it and placed cannons in it.

The lower town is walled to the west, south and east. To the west is the main gate of the town, which leads to the bridge and the harbor. During Byzantine times it must have been incorporated into a tower and protected by additional towers, one of which survives to this day, incorporated in later alterations. A straight wall (cortina) connected tower to tower at the base of the cliff, and another reached to the sea, where there was a corner tower. The south-west corner of the wall was strengthened in the 17th century with a cannon tower, while the gate was rebuilt and a bastion built over it. Another bastion was built near the rock. After the recapture by Venice, a strong tower was built in the southwest corner. The sea wall consists of straight sections which connected five towers beyond the two corner towers. In the middle of the wall was a gate. In the 17th century it was strengthened, as a sloping wall and a small bastion were built. The eastern wall resembles the western, with straight sections between towers. It has a gate in the middle that leads out of the town. To strengthen the western wall, the Ottomans also built a fortress outside the walls with many cannons.

=== Churches ===
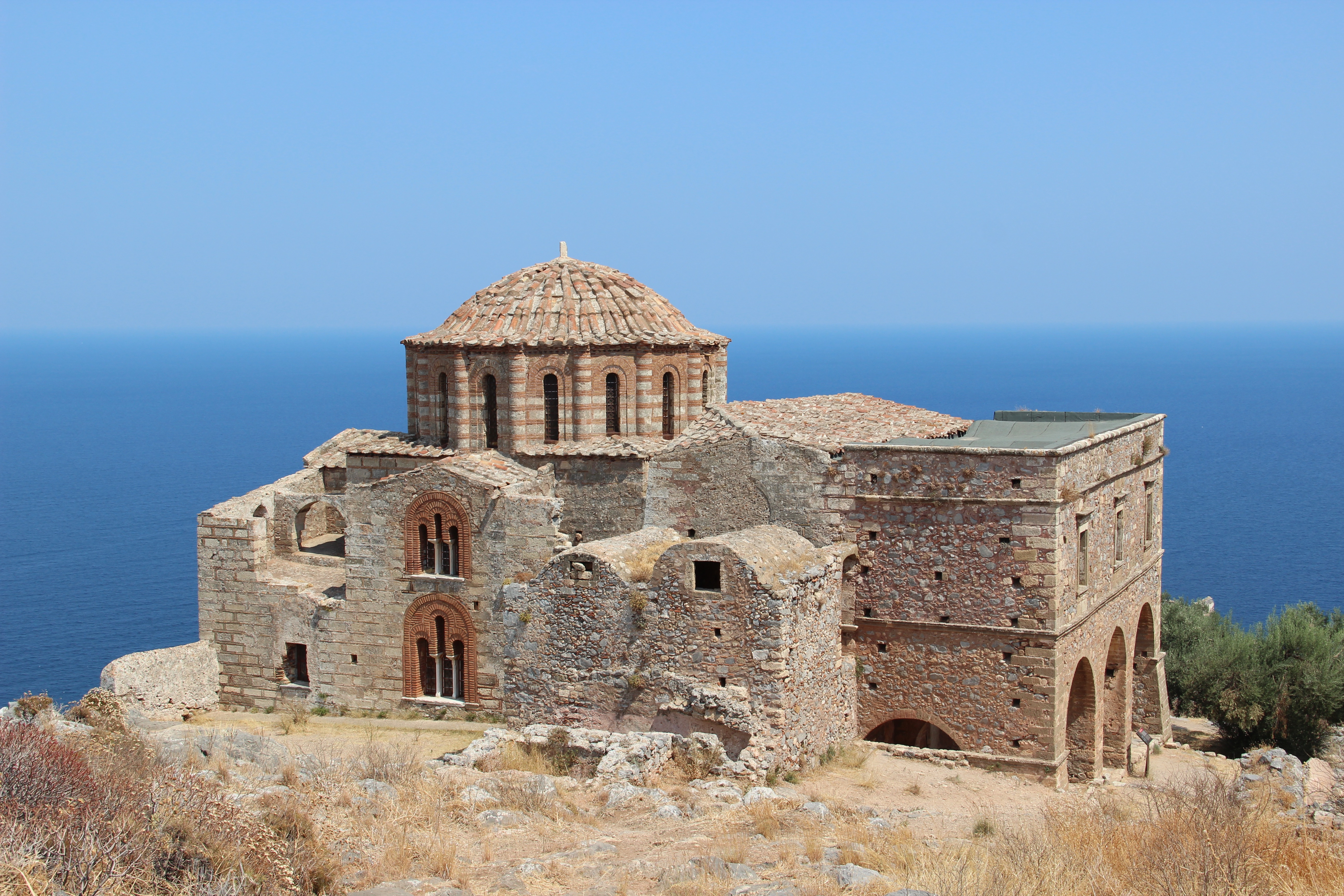
- The Church of Hagia Sophia.
  The Church of Hagia Sophia (Ναός της Αγίας Σοφίας) in the upper town, near the edge of the cliff. The church dates from Byzantine times, and was built according to the prevailing Byzantine architecture of the 12th century. It is an built according to the cross-in-square structure. It has been identified with the temple of Odigetria mentioned in various sources. The main temple measures 14 by 14 meters and the dome is 7 meters in diameter and has 16 windows. The narthex measures two stories. The temple had rich sculptural decoration. Parts of frescoes have been preserved, such as two archangels in the narthex, a scene from the life of Saint Nicholas in the northern chancel, and a depiction of Christ as the "Ancient of Days" ("Παλαιός των Ημερών") in the sanctuary. After the completion of the temple, a double portico was added to the south façade externally, while during the Venetian times a two-story external gallery was added to the west façade. During the first Ottoman rule, the temple was turned into a mosque and the frescoes were whitewashed. Restoration works of the temple took place in 1958, with the restoration of Byzantine elements, but some of the architectural members had been modified to such an extent that they could not be used and thus were transferred to the archaeological collection.
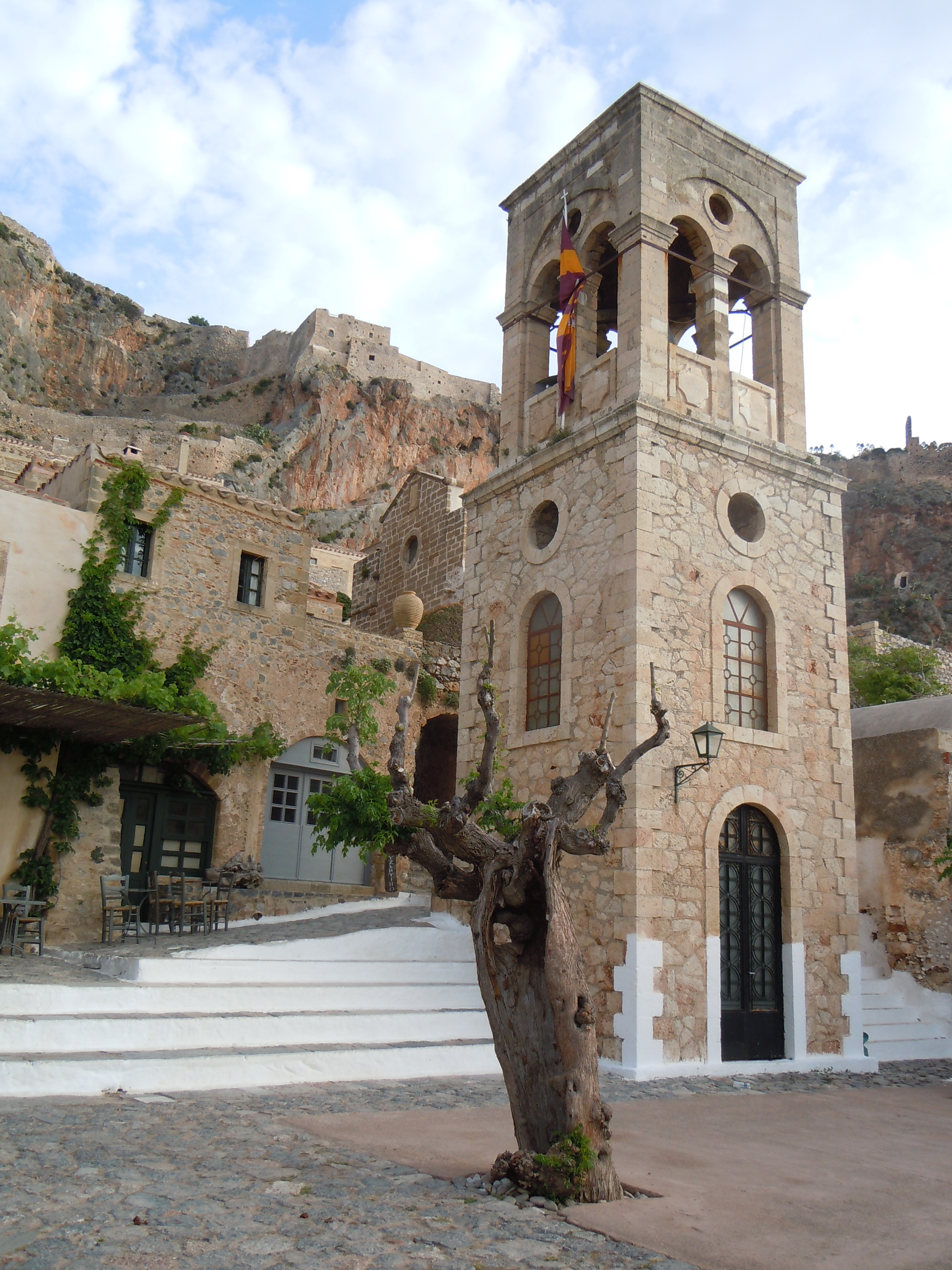
- The Church of Christos Elkomenos.
  The Church of Christos Elkomenos (Ναός του Χριστού Ελκόμενου) in the central square of the lower town is the metropolitan church of Monemvasia. Today the church has the form of a three-aisled basilica with a dome. The middle nave is raised and separated from the other two by pillars. The belfry is separate from the temple, northwest of it. The church was originally built in the 6th century AD and has since undergone a series of modifications. The central arch is semi-circular and has an internal synthronon, which suggests that the temple dates from the early Christian era. A second phase of construction took place during the 11th-12th centuries, as can be seen from the sculptures above the temple door. In 1538, according to an inscription, construction work was carried out, while an inscription above the west door states that work was completed in 1697, which probably related to the construction of the dome and the narthex. The temple does not appear to have been wall-painted. Inside it were kept icons, such as the icon of Elkomenos that was brought to Constantinople by Isaac II Angelos in the 12th century; the icon of the Crucifixion of Christ, from the 14th century, which is exhibited in the Byzantine Museum; and several post-Byzantine icons.
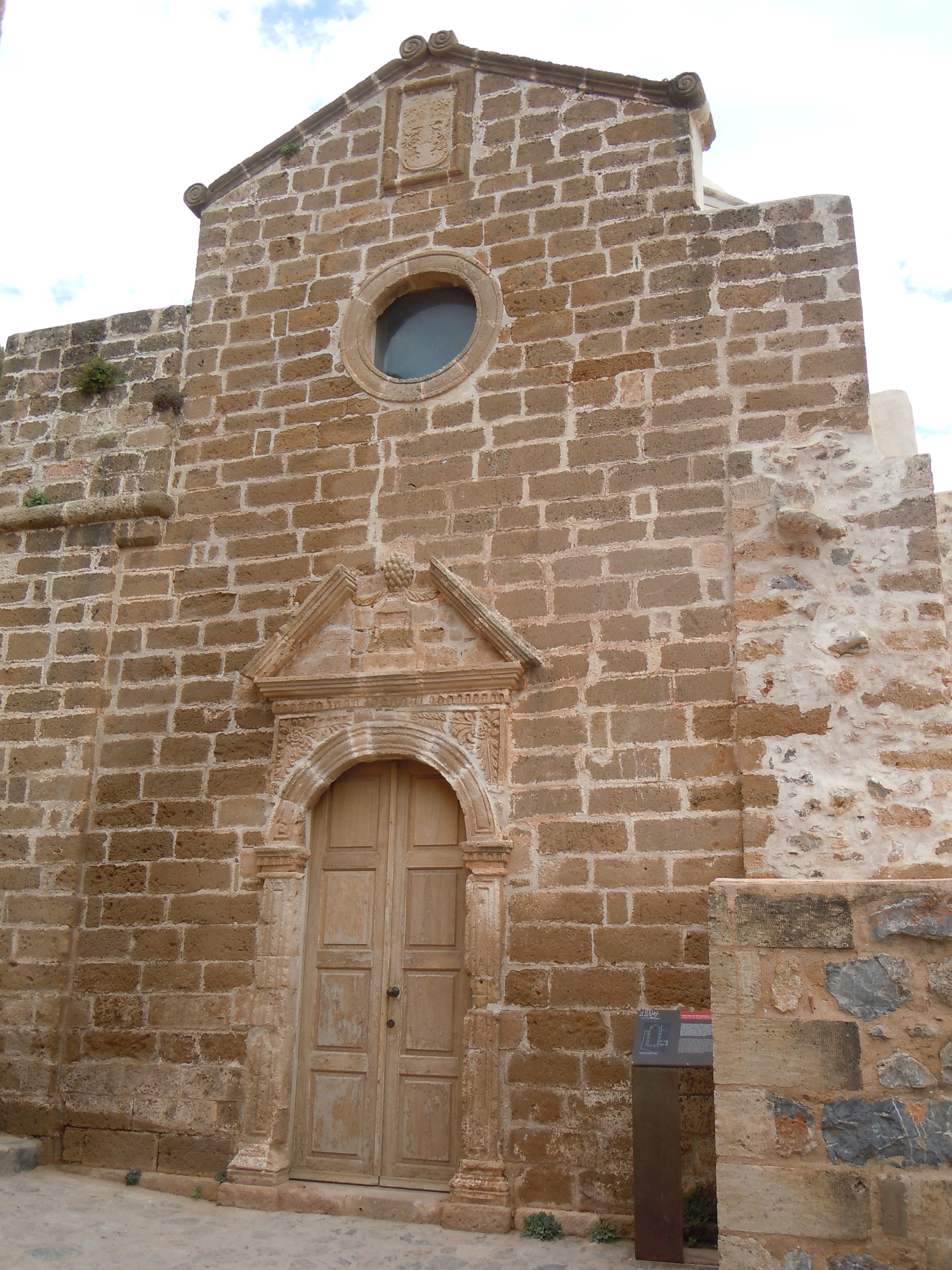
- The façade of Panagia Myrtidiotissa.
  Panagia Myrtidiotissa (Παναγία η Μυρτιδιώτισσα) or Panagia Kritikia (Παναγία η Κρητικιά) was built north of the temple of Elkomenos during the second Venetian period, in a district where Cretans settled. It is a one-room basilica with a dome. It has a large central arch. The façade and the dome are built of ashlar and the rest of the temple of mudstone. The façade features decorative elements with Italianate influences, such as the round skylight and cornices and decorated pediments with geometric and floral motifs.
- Panagia Chrysafitissa (Παναγία η Χρυσαφίτισσα) is located near the sea wall and Chrysafitissa square. It has a large dome and a narrow narthex on the western façade. The temple was built during the first Ottoman occupation and has Islamic influences. The temple is plastered inside.
- The Church of Agios Nikolaos (Ναός του Αγίου Νικολάου) is located northeast of Panagia Chrysafitissa. It is a three-aisled basilica with a dome, with aisles separated by pillars. On the western façade there is an inscription which states that the temple was built by Andrea Licinio in 1703. Both the decoration and the construction have Western European influences.
- The Church of Agios Spyridon (Ναός του Αγίου Σπυρίδωνα) is two-aisled and dates from the second Venetian period. It is located below the upper city gate.
- The Church of Agios Antonios (Ναός του Αγίου Αντωνίου), northeast of the church of Elkomenos, dates from Byzantine times, but its current form dates from the second Venetian period. It is a single-bay vaulted temple with two blind apses preserved on the north wall. The church's worn frescoes, such as a hierarch and two saints holding a cross in the northwest apse, date from the late 13th or 14th century.
- The Church of Agia Paraskevi (Ναός της Αγίας Παρασκευής) is a small chapel on the northwest side of the church of Elkomenos. It is single room and vaulted.
- The Church of the Holy Apostles (Ναός των Αγίων Αποστόλων), a small cave church with traces of frescoes from the second Venetian period.
- The double-aisled Church of Saints Demetrius and Anthony (Ναός των Αγίων Δημητρίου και Αντωνίου), of the second Venetian period.
- Hagia Anna the Catholic (Άννα η Καθολική) a small one-room church on the main street of the lower town. It has a peculiar space on its northern side. Based on its characteristics, it was built in the second Venetian period.
- Hagia Anna of Malta (Αγία Άννα της Μάλτας) is a three-aisled basilica of the 2nd Venetian period, whose eastern side has deteriorated.
- Also preserved in Monemvasia are the ruined churches of Hagia Anna, Hagioi Tessarakontos, Hagios Ioannis, and Panagia (with traces of frescoes), Evangelistrias, Katichoumenon and a small single-aisled Middle Byzantine church with a sculpted marble iconostasis that was discovered near the sea walls in 1974.

=== Other religious buildings ===
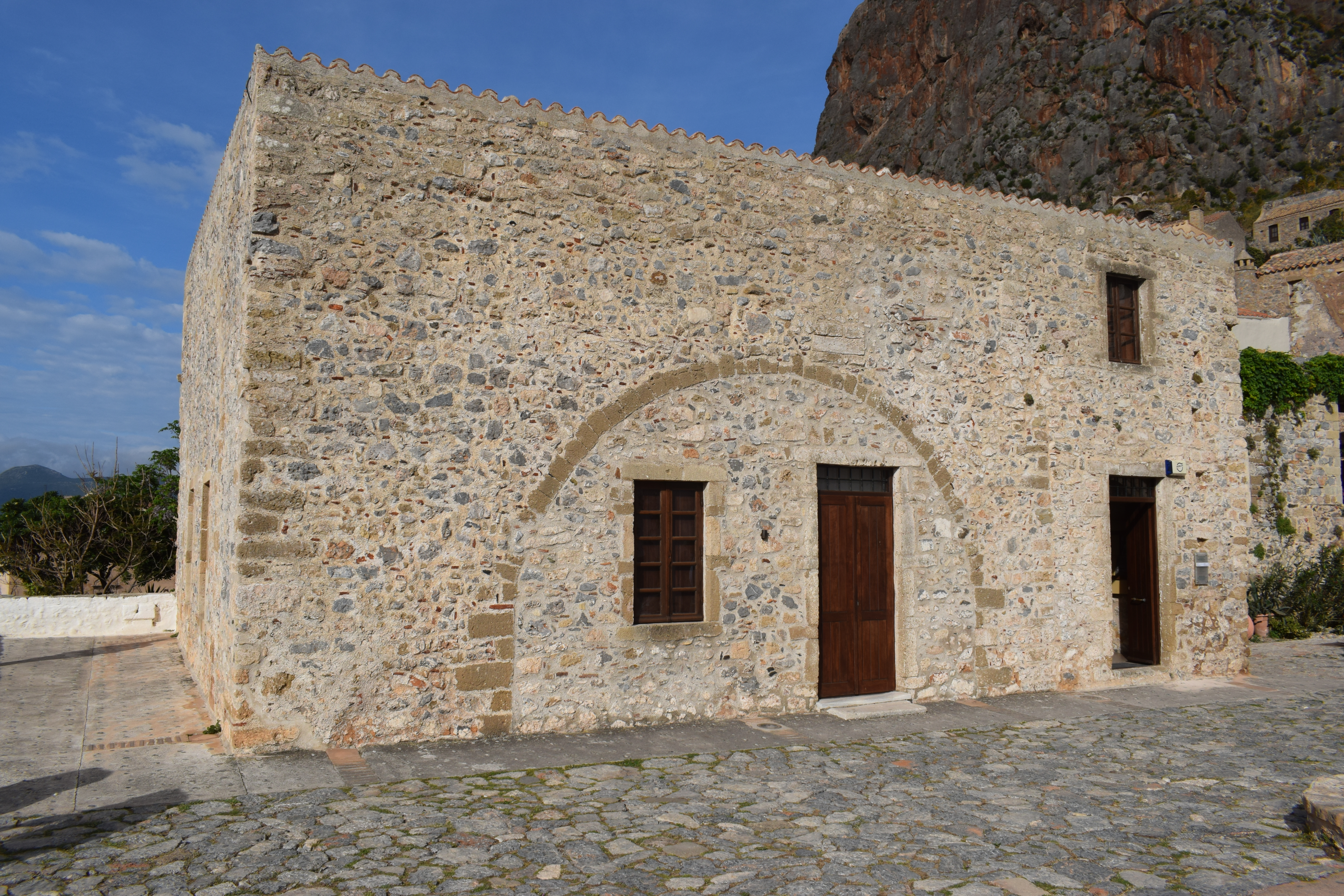
The former mosque of Monemvasia.

The Mosque of Monemvasia was erected in the square of Elkomenos during the first Ottoman occupation. After the recovery of Monemvasia by the Venetians in 1690, the building changed its use and was probably used by the Capuchins as a monastery. In 1715, when the Ottomans recaptured Monemvasia, the building became a mosque again. After the Revolution of 1821, the building was turned into a prison and later, in the middle of the 20th century, it functioned as a café. Since 1999, it has housed the archaeological collection of Monemvasia. The building is structurally simple, consisting of two halls, a square hall with a lowered dome and a rectangular space. The former mihrab and minaret no longer exist. The entrance is from the eastern façade, where there are two doors but only the northern one is used. Sealed openings can also be seen, such as a Venetian portico on the north façade. The walls are made of rough stone construction and hewn ashlar stones are used in the openings and some architectural details.

South of the church of Elkomenos, the old episcopal palace (bishop's residence) is preserved. Above its entrance, a lion relief survives, which is the symbol of Venice.

=== Archaeological collection ===
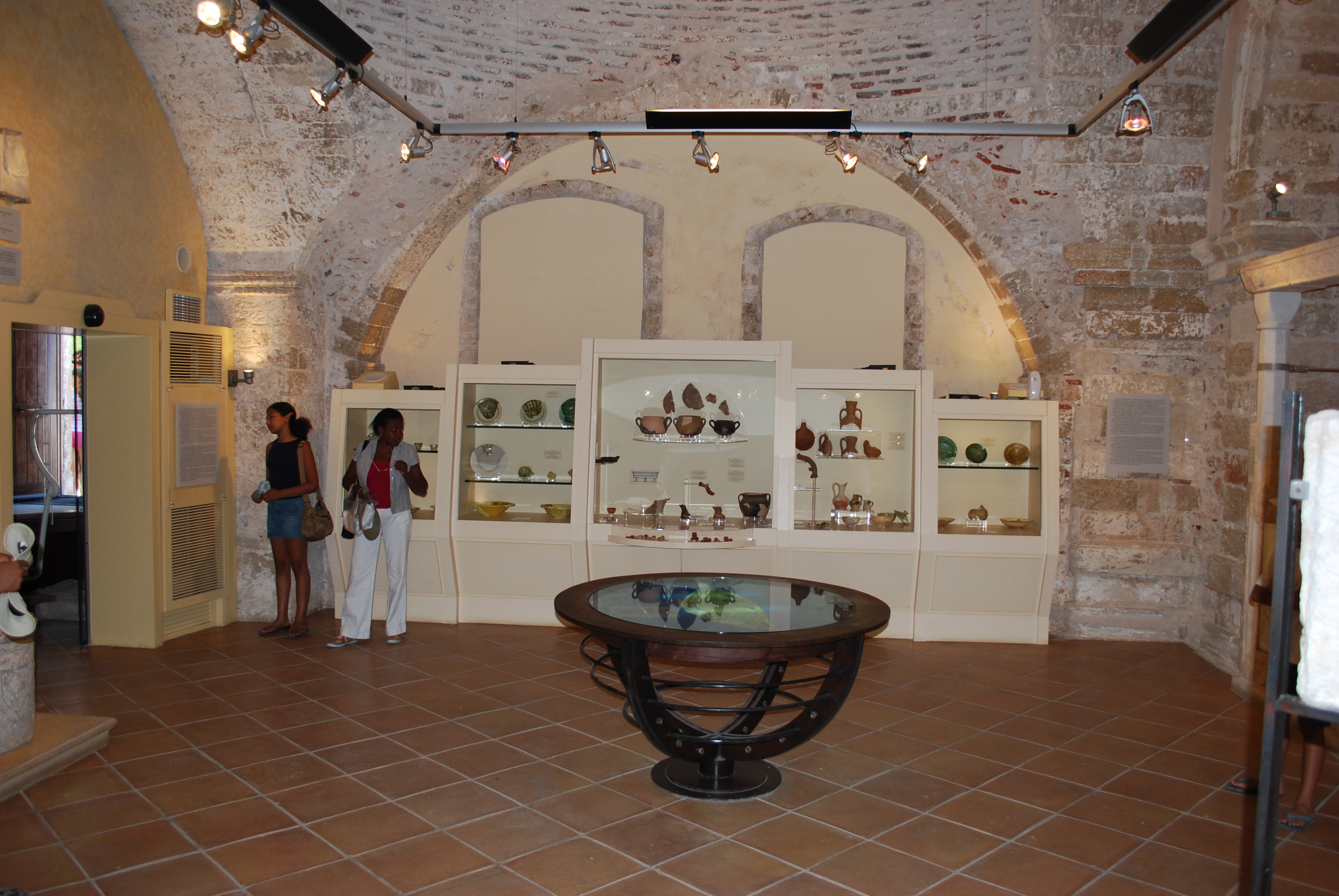
The archaeological collection of Monemvasia.

The archaeological collection of Monemvasia was inaugurated in July 1999 and is housed in the former Ottoman mosque, located in Elkomenos square. The collection includes finds from the excavations and restorations that took place in Monemvasia. The exhibits are exhibited in the vaulted hall on the ground floor of the building, measuring 60 m^{2} (650 sq ft), which is separated from the entrance by a wall. The original floor has been covered with ceramic tiles to protect it. Most of the exhibits are architectural sculptures from the early Christian, Byzantine and post-Byzantine periods and ceramic objects of daily use, while there are also a small number of coins, lamps and glass objects. Among the sculptures stand out those from the church of Hagia Sophia and the restored marble iconostasis of a small church from the Middle Byzantine period that was excavated on a private plot near the sea walls. Other exhibits include Venetian-era coats of arms and cisterns.

=== Houses ===
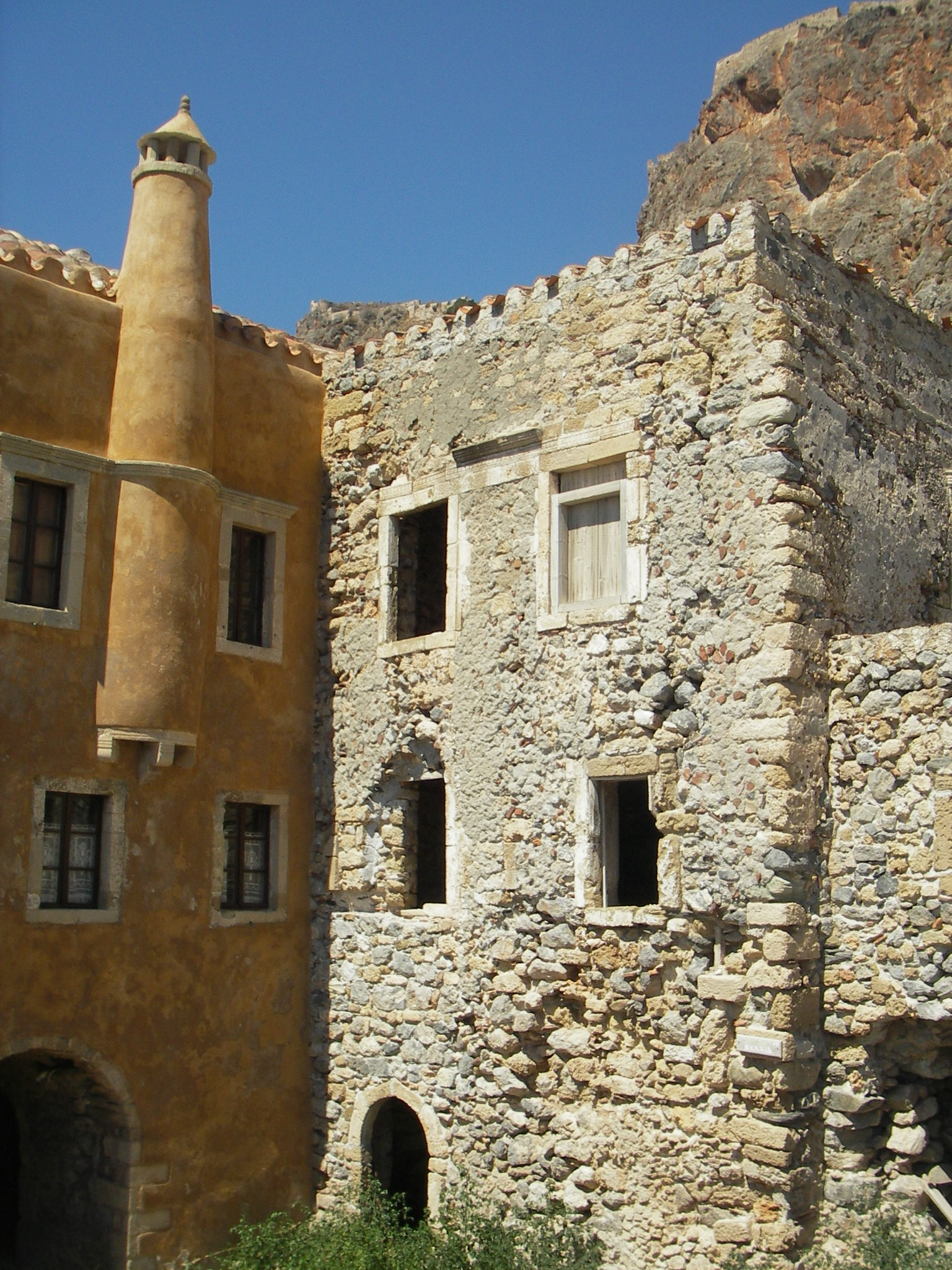
Typical venetian-built house in Monemvasia.

The lower city of Monemvasia is, like other Byzantine castle-cities, densely built. Most houses have a narrow façade and are arranged perpendicular to the slopes of the land. These houses generally have three levels. The lower level has an independent entrance and was intended for the stable of animals and had a cistern in a separate area, where the rainwater was collected. Cisterns and reservoirs were necessary as there are no natural water sources in Monemvasia. Above are utility rooms, such as the galley and, occasionally, the bath and fireplace. There was also in this area the mouth of the cistern, through which the water was collected. Access to the upper level was by a small wooden ladder fixed to a stone base. The family stayed in this space and it had many windows. Although the houses may vary typologically, the three-level layout is common to all.

Houses may have large chimneys and curved cornices formed by roof gutters that lead water to the cistern. Other decorative elements are pilasters and incised crowns. The walls of the houses are made of mudstone and mortar and the outside is plastered to withstand the weather conditions. Other architectural elements such as doorways, chimneys and corner stones are made of ashlar. For the floors, they can be made of kourasani (κουρασάνι), a "high quality lime mortar which also includes brick dust and natural pozzolana", slates, marble, and tiles, while the floors are made of wood. Wood is also used in interior walls, roofs and frames, but its use is generally limited due to its limited availability.

Due to the lack of space within the castle, there were no cultivated lands and gardens. The French naturalist and military officer Jean Baptiste Bory de Saint-Vincent visited Monemvasia in 1829 and noted that houses may have small walled gardens with only one almond tree inside.

=== Other buildings ===
Due to the absence of natural water sources, Monemvasia has public cisterns. Three large public reservoirs are located in the western part of the upper town, where it was more sparsely populated and more protected than the lower town in case of siege. These cisterns are semi-underground, built long and narrow and are coated internally with kourasani so that they are watertight up to the point where the dome begins. In the lower city there are two underground cisterns whose mouths are now in squares, but it is not clear whether they were public cisterns or private cisterns.

In the upper town, near the reservoirs, an Ottoman fountain is preserved. The fountain is four-sided and covered with a dome. It is likely that its water came from the reservoirs. Additionally, in the upper city, near the church of Hagia Sophia, there is a ruined 17th-century bathhouse, of which the small dome and cisterns have been preserved. In the lower town, south of the central square, a bathhouse of the first Ottoman occupation is preserved, in the place of the sanctuary of the Byzantine church of Sotiros.

At the eastern end of the island is a modern lighthouse. The lighthouse was built in 1896 and began operation in 1897. Its focal height is 15 metres (49 ft) above sea level and its beam reaches 11 nautical miles. Next to the lighthouse tower, 7 metres (23 ft) high, is the lighthouse keeper's stone residence. A marble staircase leads to the lighthouse cage. Restoration work on the lighthouse was completed in December 2015. It has a small exhibition about the Greek network of lighthouses.

== Geography ==
The rock of Monemvasia was separated from the rest of the mainland by an earthquake in 375 AD leaving only a narrow tombolo connecting the two. The majority of the rock's area is a plateau about 100 metres (330 ft) above sea level, and the town of the same name is built on the slope to the south-east of the rock, overlooking Palaia Monemvasia bay. Many of the streets are narrow and fit only for pedestrian and donkey traffic. A small hamlet of about ten houses lies to the northwest.

=== Climate ===
Monemvasia has a very hot-summer Mediterranean climate (Csa in the Köppen climate classification) with mild winters and very hot summers. The highest temperature ever recorded was 45.2 °C (113.4 °F) on 26 June 2007 and the lowest 1.6 °C (34.9 °F) on 17 February 2008. The World Meteorological Organization station of the National Observatory of Athens is located in mainland Greece, just off the tied island of Monemvasia. Monemvasia falls in 11a plant hardiness zone and is the only area in mainland Greece that belongs to 11a zone.

On 27 June 2007 Monemvasia registered a staggering 24 hours minimum temperature of 35.9 °C which is the highest minimum temperature ever recorded in mainland Greece. During that night Monemvasia did not drop below 36.3 °C. Monemvasia has never recorded a temperature below 1.5 °C in its entire recorded meteorological history. Moreover, Monemvasia records 133 tropical nights per year which is unique for a location in mainland Europe. Monemvasia has never recorded snow accumulation the past 80 years.

Climate data for Monemvasia (17 m a.s.l.) Climate: Hot-summer Mediterranean climate (Csa) • USDA: 11a (4.53°C)
Month	Jan	Feb	Mar	Apr	May	Jun	Jul	Aug	Sep	Oct	Nov	Dec	Year
Record high °C (°F)	22.4 (72.3)	25.3 (77.5)	26.3 (79.3)	30.5 (86.9)	35.3 (95.5)	45.2 (113.4)	42.7 (108.9)	39.9 (103.8)	38.3 (100.9)	33.2 (91.8)	31.4 (88.5)	24.9 (76.8)	45.2 (113.4)
Mean daily maximum °C (°F)	15.2 (59.4)	15.8 (60.4)	17.4 (63.3)	20.7 (69.3)	25.0 (77.0)	29.8 (85.6)	32.3 (90.1)	32.2 (90.0)	28.7 (83.7)	23.9 (75.0)	20.3 (68.5)	16.7 (62.1)	23.2 (73.7)
Daily mean °C (°F)	12.9 (55.2)	13.4 (56.1)	14.7 (58.5)	17.6 (63.7)	21.5 (70.7)	26.0 (78.8)	28.8 (83.8)	28.9 (84.0)	25.6 (78.1)	21.5 (70.7)	18.1 (64.6)	14.6 (58.3)	20.3 (68.5)
Mean daily minimum °C (°F)	10.6 (51.1)	11.0 (51.8)	11.9 (53.4)	14.5 (58.1)	18.0 (64.4)	22.3 (72.1)	25.2 (77.4)	25.6 (78.1)	22.5 (72.5)	19.2 (66.6)	16.0 (60.8)	12.5 (54.5)	17.4 (63.4)
Record low °C (°F)	2.1 (35.8)	1.6 (34.9)	4.2 (39.6)	9.1 (48.4)	12.1 (53.8)	15.8 (60.4)	18.4 (65.1)	20.5 (68.9)	16.7 (62.1)	12.5 (54.5)	8.9 (48.0)	4.7 (40.5)	1.6 (34.9)
Average rainfall mm (inches)	106.0 (4.17)	71.9 (2.83)	36.7 (1.44)	20.4 (0.80)	8.4 (0.33)	9.2 (0.36)	2.5 (0.10)	1.2 (0.05)	25.4 (1.00)	58.3 (2.30)	99.5 (3.92)	95.7 (3.77)	535.2 (21.07)
Source 1: National Observatory of Athens Monthly Bulletins (Apr 2007 - Mar 2026)
Source 2: Monemvasia N.O.A station and World Meteorological Organization

== Notable people ==
- Isidore of Kiev (c. 1385–1463), Eastern (Greek) Catholic cardinal
- Loukas Notaras (d. 1453), the last Byzantine Megas Doux member of Notaras family
- Yiannis Ritsos (1909–1990), poet
- George Sphrantzes (1401–c. 1478), Byzantine historian

== Gallery ==
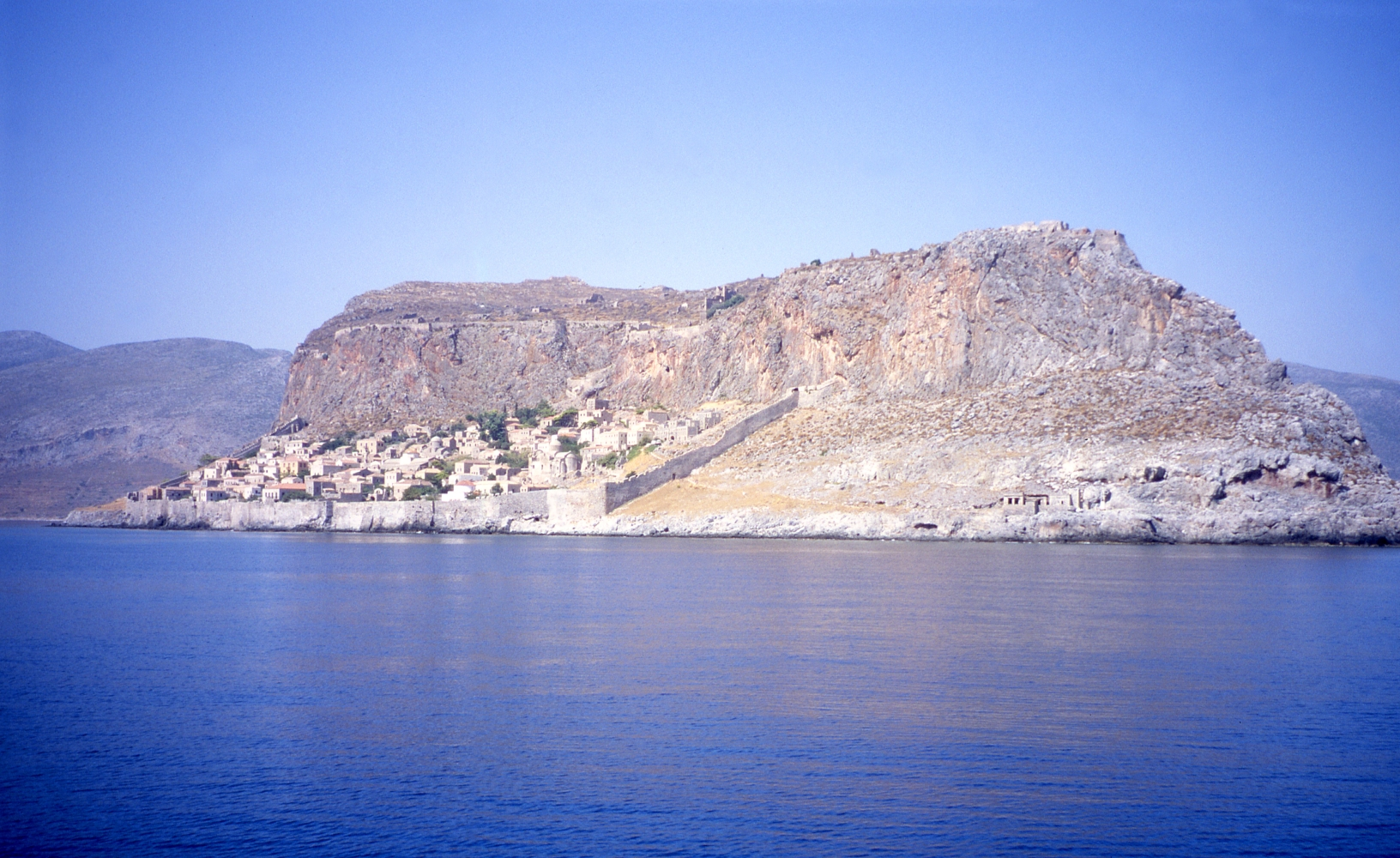
Island of Monemvasia from the sea

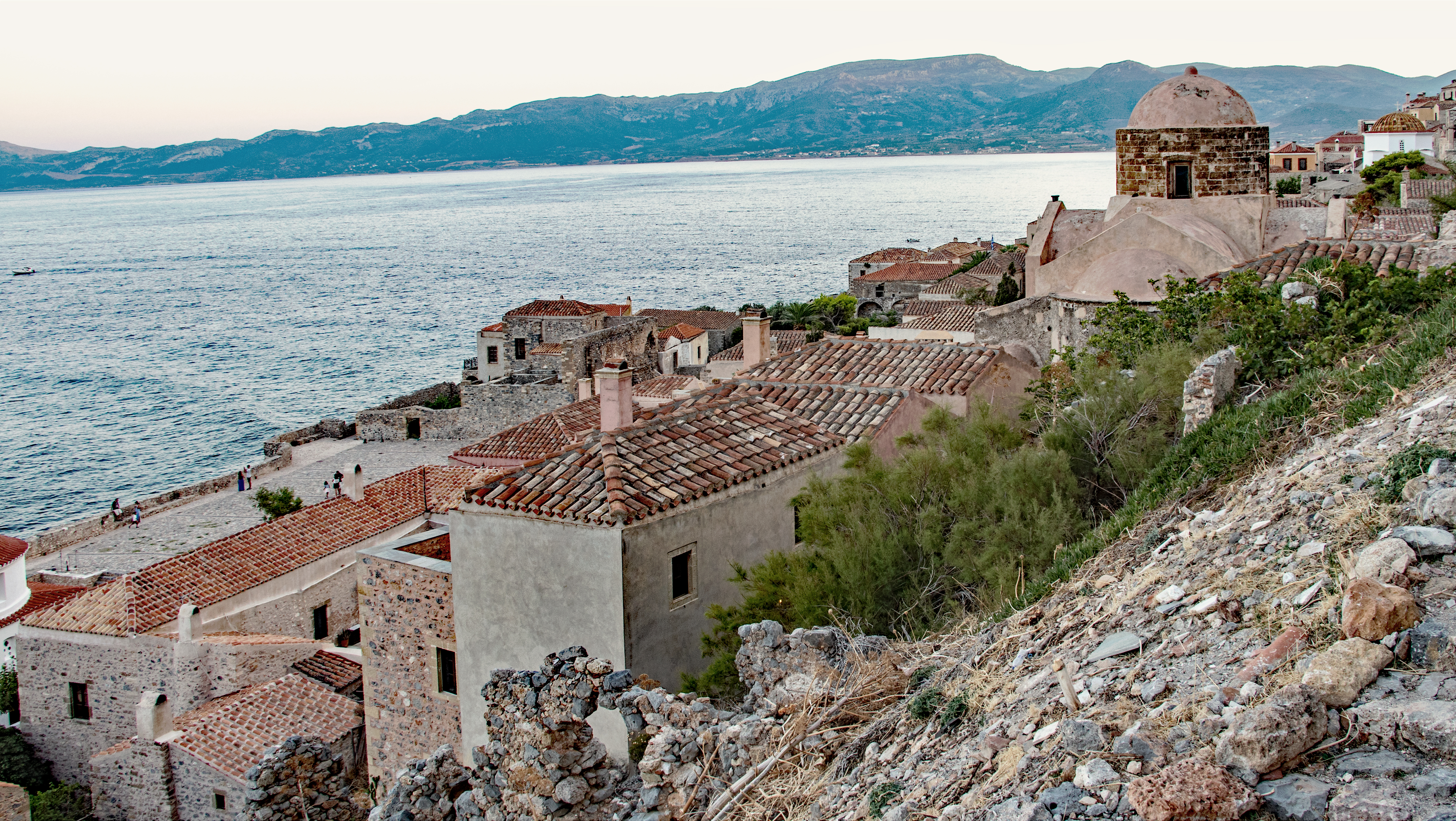
View of the lower town from inland

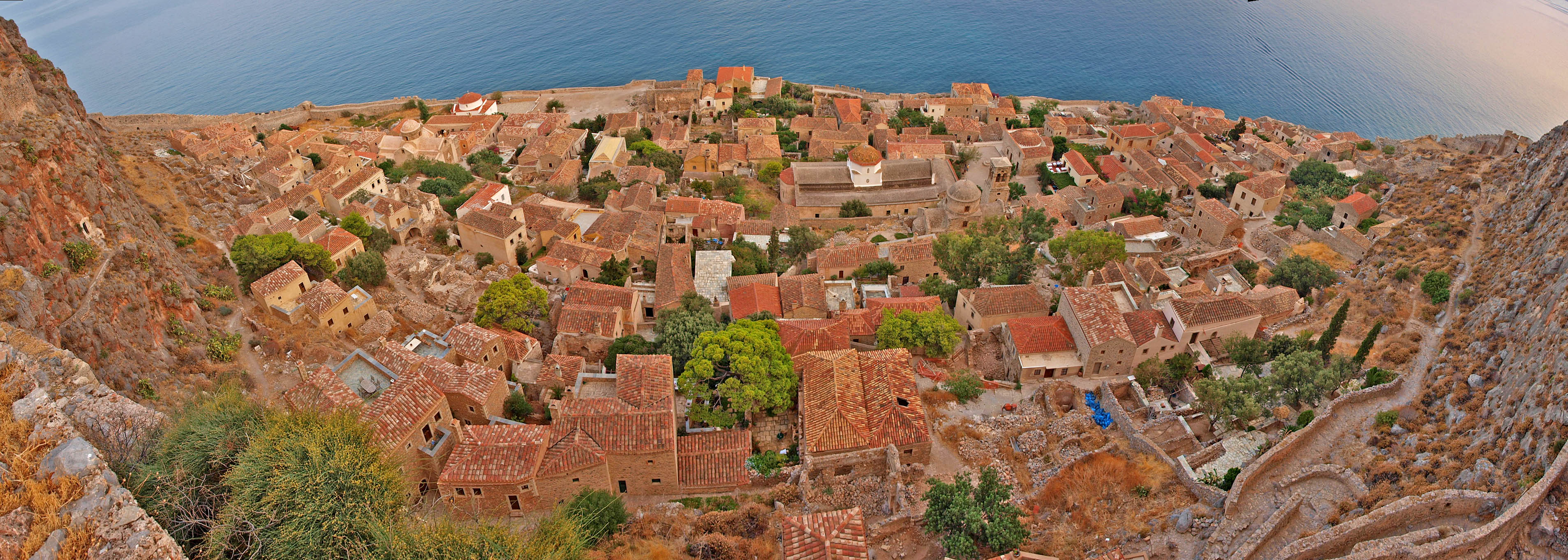
Panorama over Monemvasia lower town

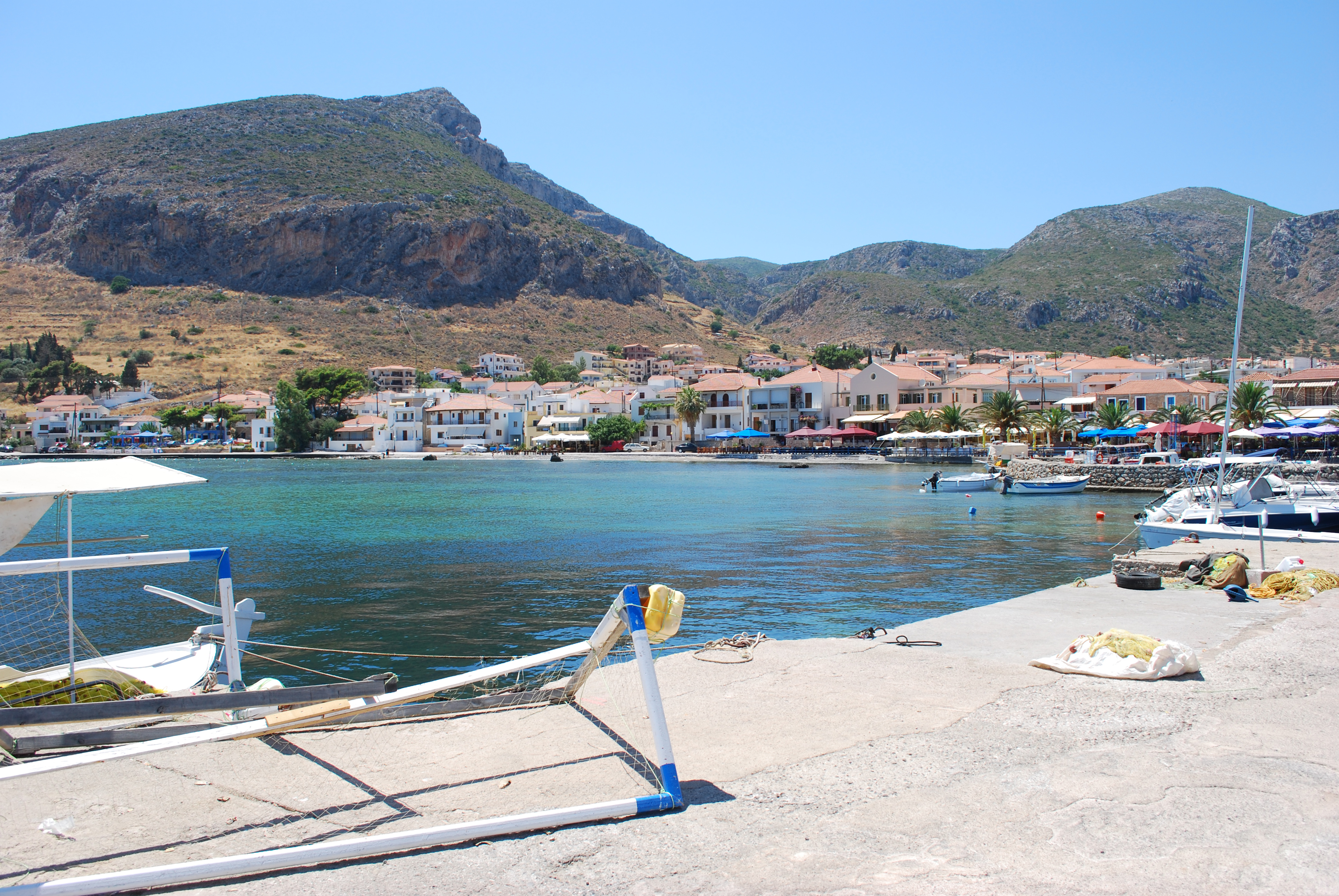
View of the port across the causeway

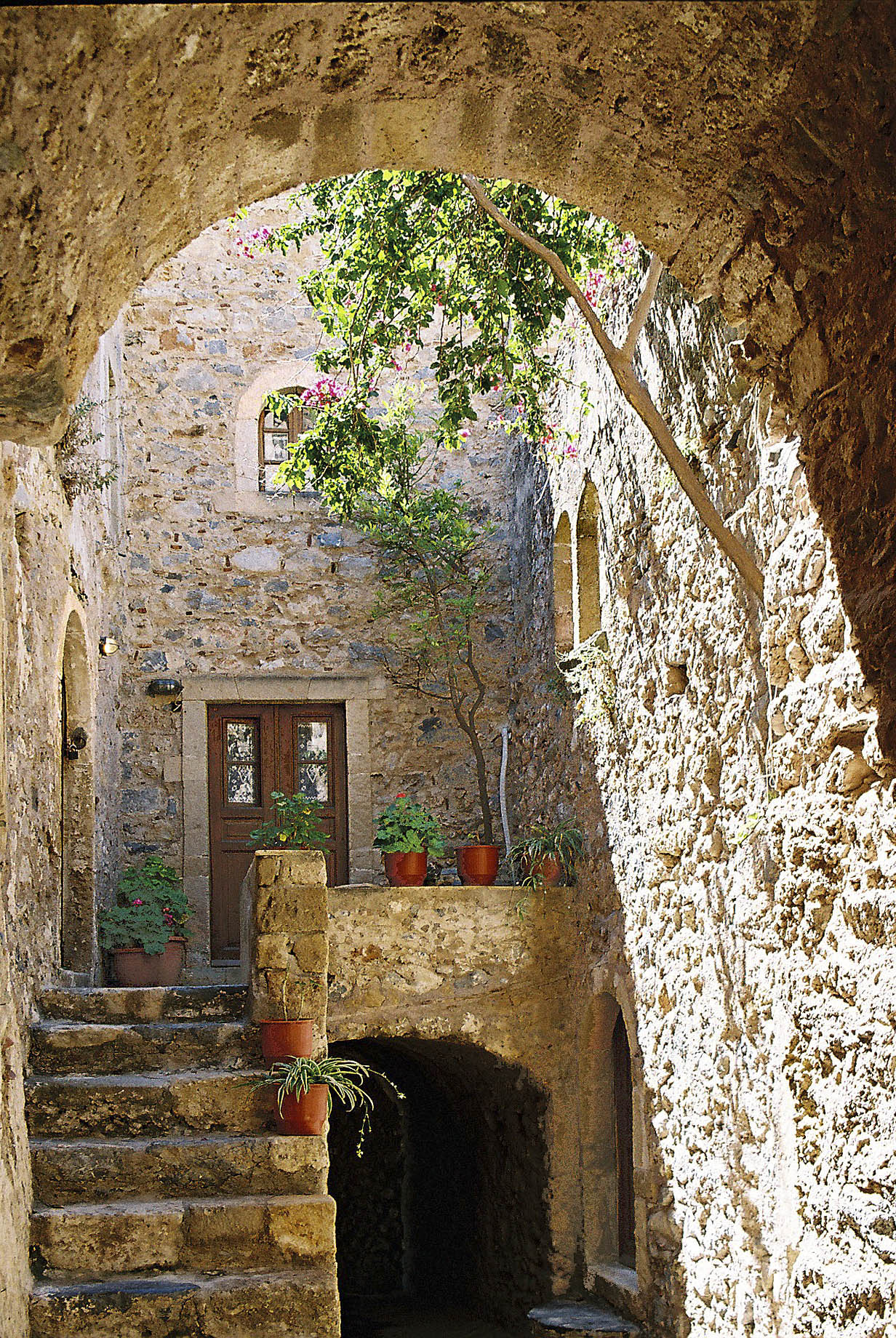
Old house

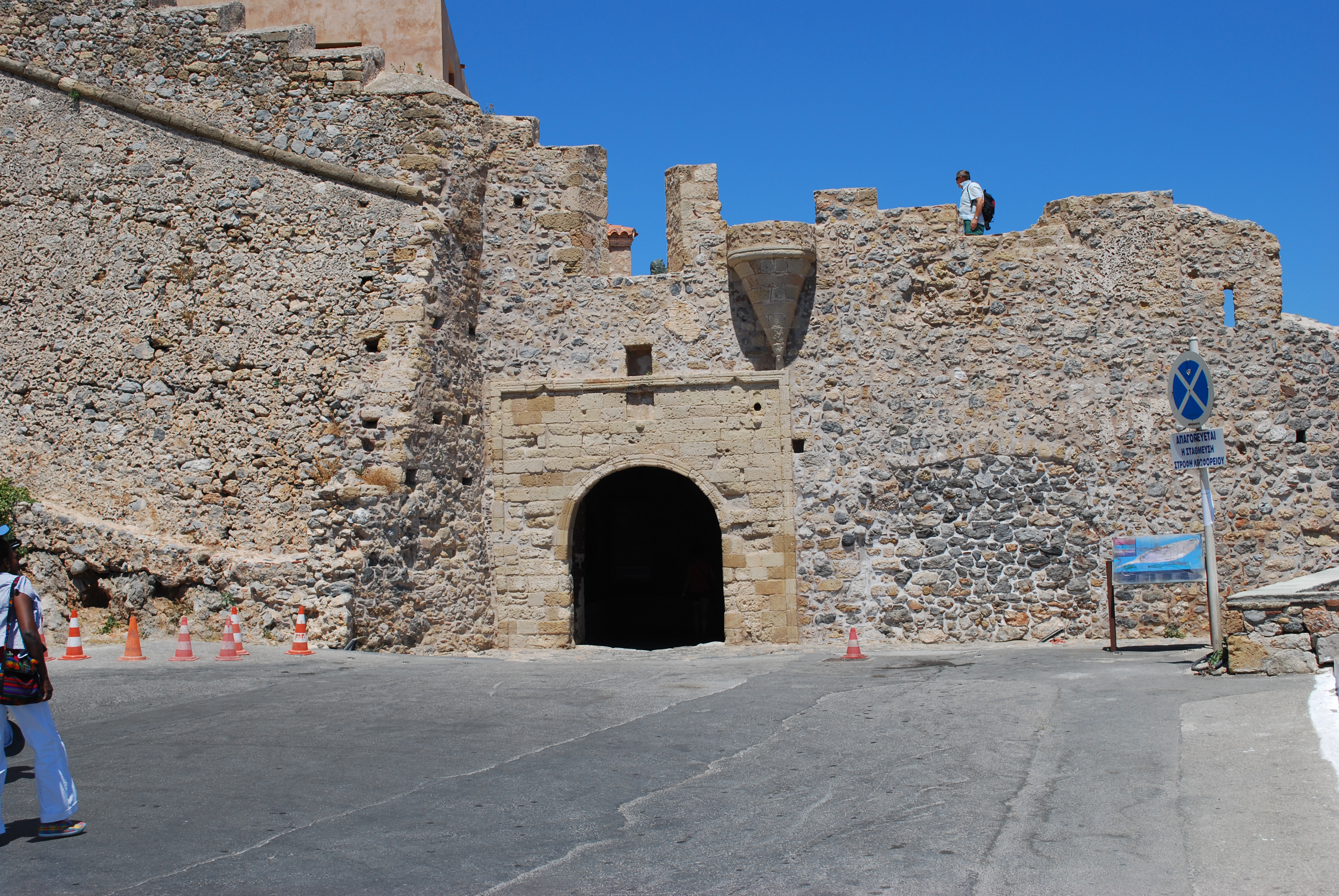
Western entrance to the town

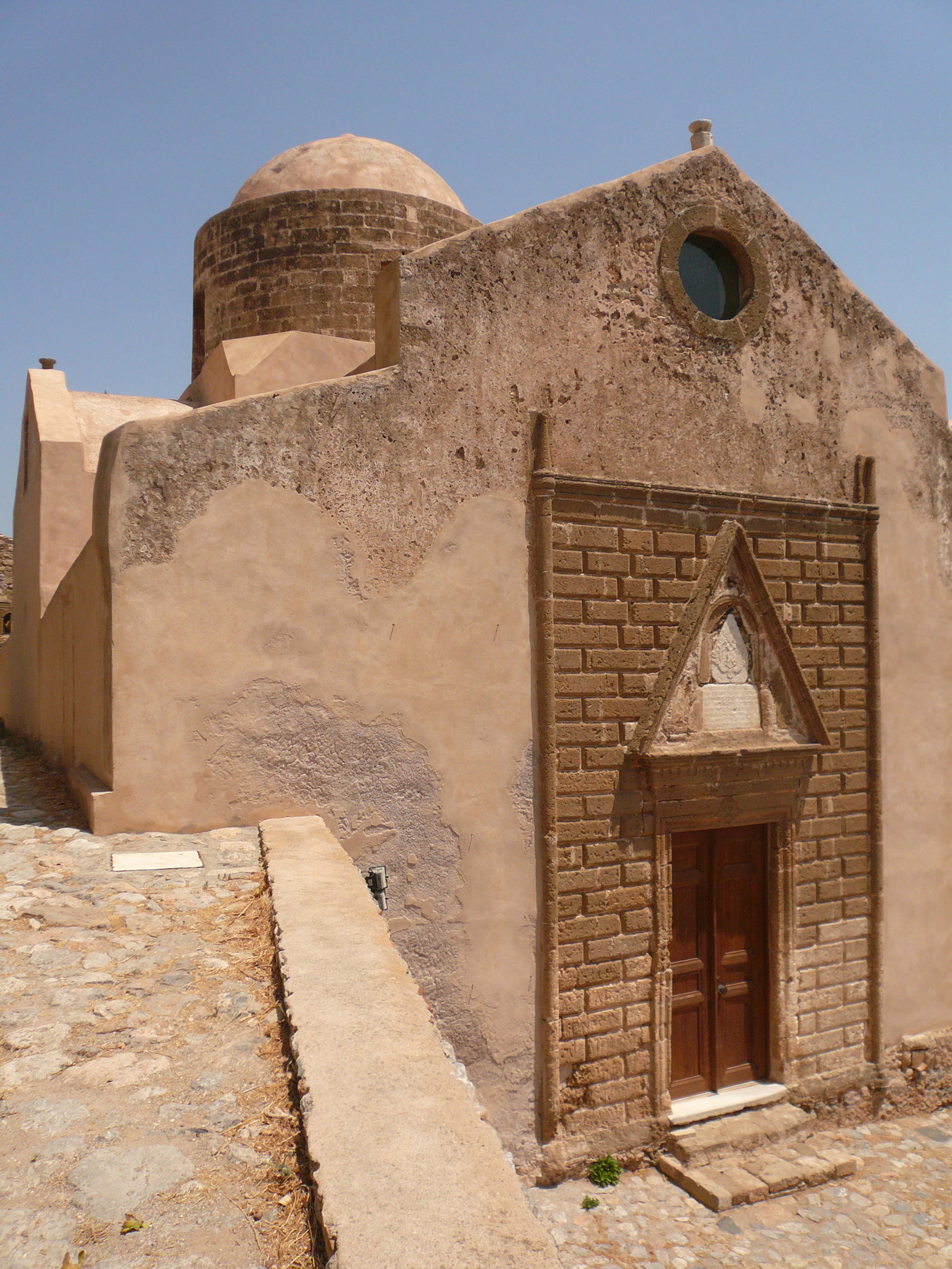
The church of Agios Nikolaos

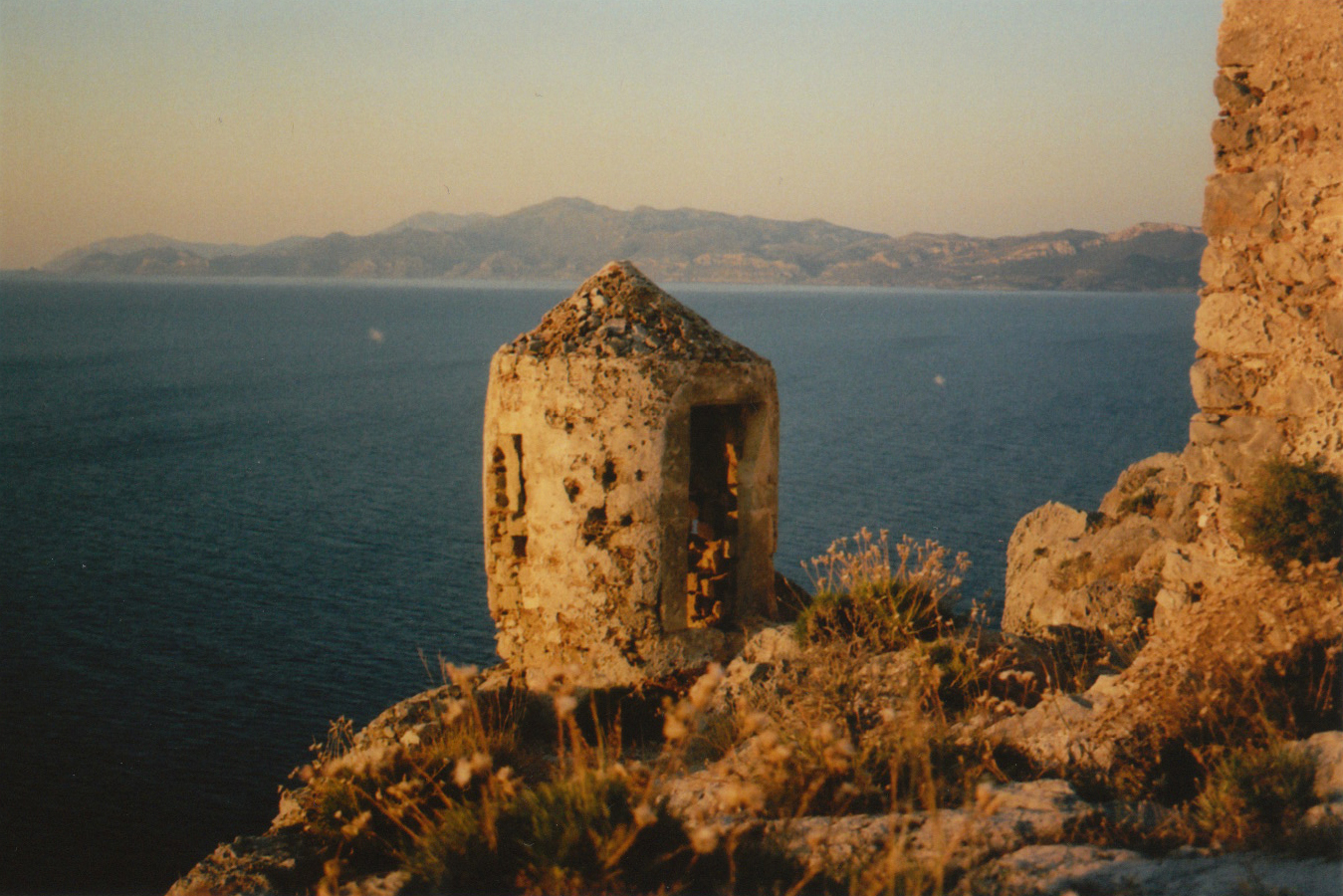
Watchtower on the walls

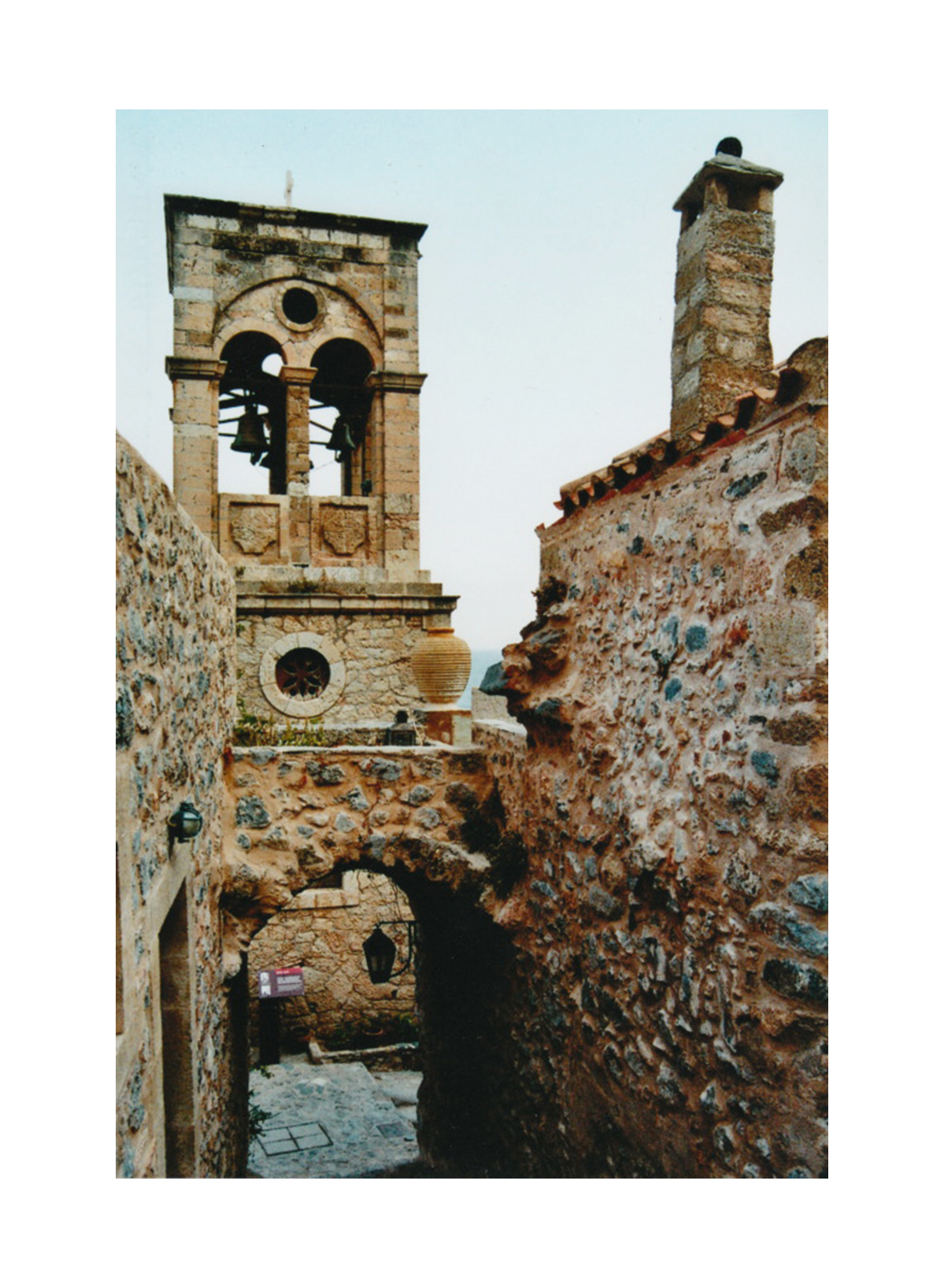
Bell tower

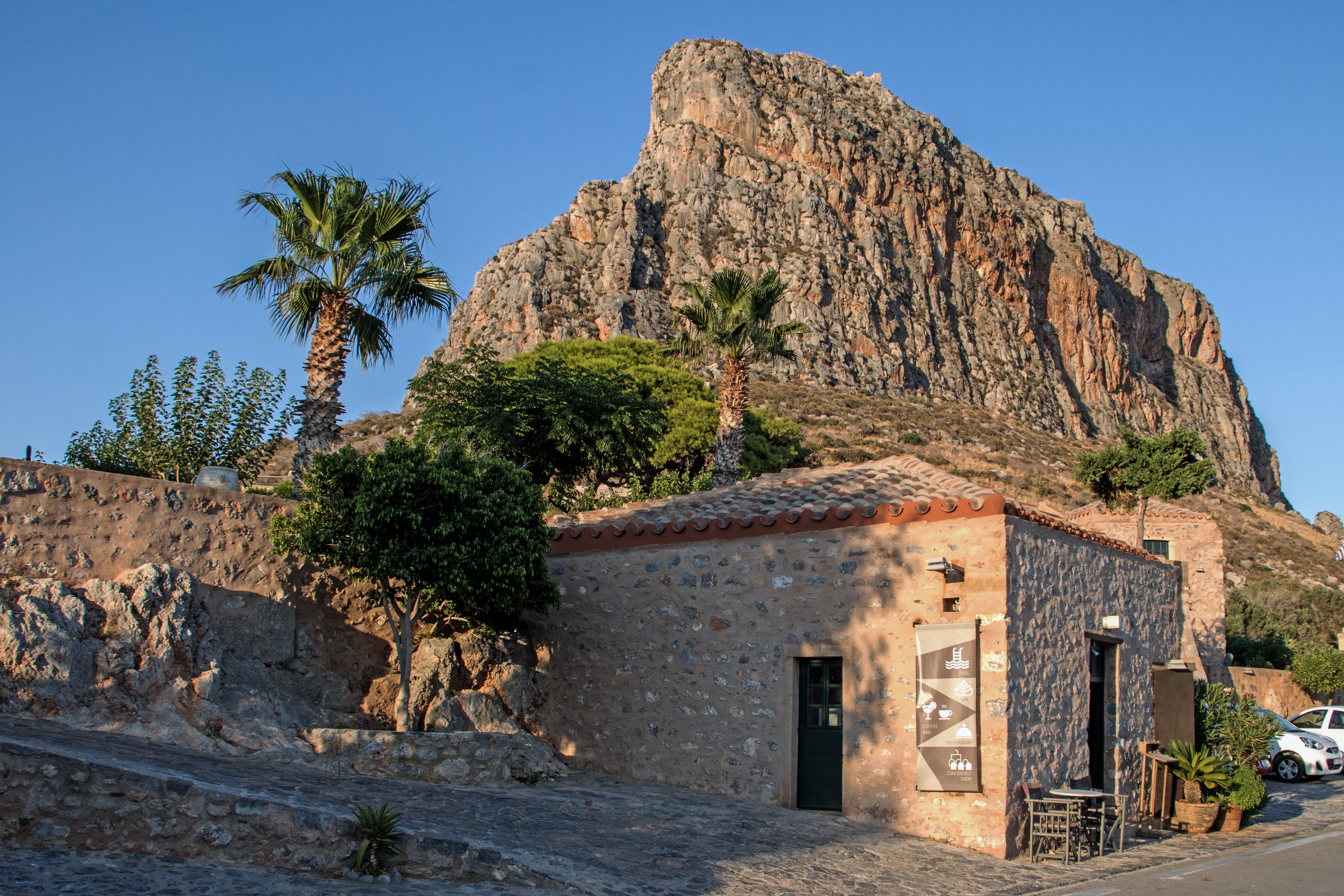
A view of the plateau from the west

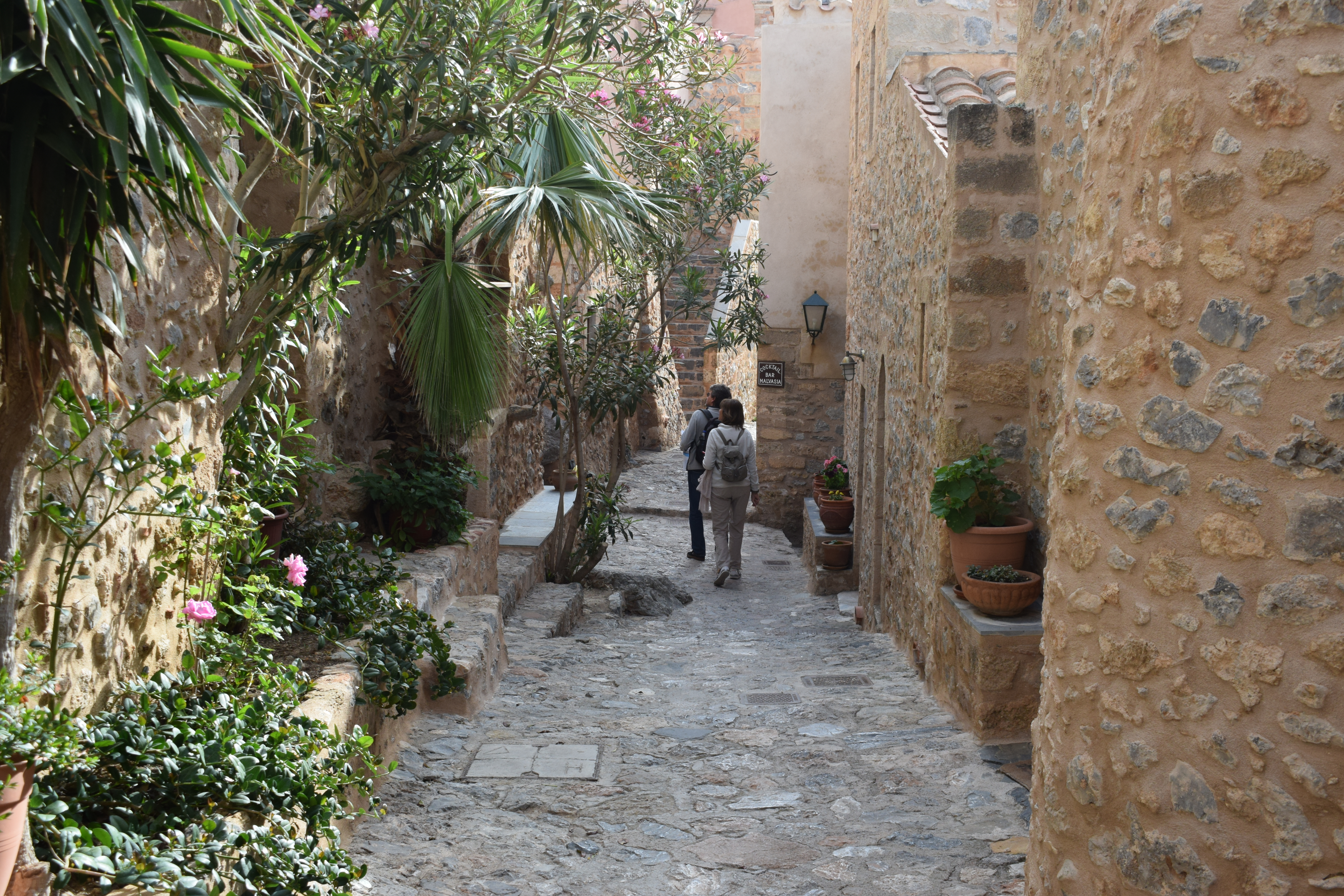
The streets of Monemvasia

== See also ==
- List of settlements in Laconia
