= Siege of Monemvasia (1821) =

Military engagement in 1821 during the Greek Revolution

- Part of the Greek War of Independence
Date	15 March 1821 – 23 July 1821 (4 months, 1 week and 1 day)
Location	Monemvasia fortress
Result	Greek victory

Belligerents
Greek revolutionaries	Ottoman Empire

Commanders and leaders
Tzanetakis, Petropoulakaioi and finally Demetrios Ypsilantis	Unknown

Strength
10,000 residents of the surrounding provinces	1,500–1,600 besieged Ottomans

The siege of Monemvasia was a military engagement of the Greek War of Independence, aimed at liberating Monemvasia, shortly before the outbreak of the revolution. It lasted from 15 March to 23 July 1821. According to F. Chrysanthopoulos (Fotakos), the siege began after 25 March.

== The development of events ==
The fortress of Monemvasia was inhabited by 1,500 - 1,600 Ottomans. The Christian inhabitants of the province were approximately 10,000. After the bishop of Elos Anthimos blessed the flags of the chieftains, the siege began by land, led by Georgios Michalakis, Leonidiotis with 250 Tsakonians, Nik. Drivas and the Monemvasians, the Kalogeraios and Despotaioi with local fighters, the Maniates with leaders Tzannetakis-Grigorakis, D. Tsigourakos, the elder Kranidis, Gerakaris, the Petropoulakaioi and others.

The Turks destroyed the bridge and closed themselves in isolation in the fortress, from where they cannonaded the Greek besiegers. The most daring of them, about 150, left the fortress and went to old Monemvasia to urge others to escape and attack the besiegers from two fronts, some from the front, others from the rear. However, the plan failed, since the Greeks captured the escapees and killed most of them.

The strongest inside the fortress gathered the food, climbed the acropolis and locked themselves in there. The besieged, although suffering from a lack of food and water, did not surrender. In mid-June, Demetrios Ypsilantis arrived in the Peloponnese. The Ottomans sent someone and asked to capitulate for the surrender of the fortress. Ypsilantis' envoy was Alexandros Katakouzinos, who reached a compromise with the Ottomans of the lower fortress and forced them to come to an understanding with the acropolis.

Thus, the fortress and all weapons were surrendered on July 23, 1821, while the besieged abandoned them, deprived of their movable property, boarded ships and went to Kuşadası in Asia Minor. Kantakouzinos ordered the Tsakonians to guard the fortress, and appointed Capt. Georgakis Michalakis as the garrison commander. However, two days later the Tsakonians, dissatisfied with the way the spoils were distributed (they took nothing), departed for the siege of Tripolitsa, handing over the garrison to Tzannetakis-Grigorakis.

== Sources ==
- Λάμπρος Κουτσονίκας (1863). Γενική ιστορία της ελληνικής επαναστάσεως, Τόμος Α΄. Εν Αθήναις: Εκ του «Ευαγγέλιμου» Δ. Καρακατζάνη.
- Γεώργιος Κρέμος (1839-1926) (1879). Χρονολόγια της Ελληνικής Ιστορίας : προς χρήσιν πάντος φιλομαθούς, ιδία δε των εν τοις γυμνασίοις μαθητών. Εν Αθήναις: Τυπογραφείον Δημητρίου Ιασεμίδου.
- Φώτιος Χρυσανθόπουλος (Φωτάκος) (1858). Απομνημονεύματα περί της Ελληνικής Επαναστάσεως. Εν Αθήναις: Τύποις και βιβλιοπολείω Π.Δ Σακελλάριου.
- Πολιορκία Μονεμβασιάς: Το πρώτο μεγάλο (και άγνωστο) θρίλερ της Ελληνικής Επανάστασης
- Απελευθέρωση της Μονεμβασίας – 23 Ιουλίου 1821 – monemvasianews.gr
- Η πολιορκία και η άλωση της Μονεμβασιάς: Το πρώτο κάστρο υπό ελληνική κυριαρχία
- Πολιορκία και άλωσις της Μονεμβασίας υπό των Ελλήνων τω 1821
- ΠΟΛΙΟΡΚΙΑ ΤΗΣ ΜΟΝΕΜΒΑΣΙΑΣ
