= List of settlements in Laconia =

This is a list of settlements in Laconia, Greece.

- Afisi
- Agia Eirini
- Agioi Anargyroi
- Agioi Apostoloi
- Agios Dimitrios, Evrotas
- Agios Dimitrios, Monemvasia
- Agios Georgios
- Agios Ioannis, Evrotas
- Agios Ioannis, Monemvasia
- Agios Ioannis, Sparti
- Agios Konstantinos
- Agios Nikolaos, East Mani
- Agios Nikolaos, Monemvasia
- Agios Nikolaos, Voies
- Agios Vasileios
- Agoriani
- Agrianoi
- Aigies
- Akrogiali
- Alepochori
- Alevrou
- Alika
- Amykles
- Anavryti
- Angelona
- Ano Boularioi
- Ano Kastania
- Anogeia
- Apidea
- Archangelos, Laconia
- Archontiko
- Areopoli
- Arna
- Asopos
- Asteri
- Charakas
- Charria (Harria)
- Chosiari
- Chrysafa
- Dafni
- Dafnio
- Daimonia
- Drosopigi
- Dryalos
- Drymos
- Elafonisos
- Elaia
- Elika
- Elliniko
- Elos
- Exo Nymfi
- Faraklo
- Foiniki
- Georgitsi
- Geraki
- Germa
- Gerolimenas
- Gkoritsa
- Glykovrysi
- Goranoi
- Gouves
- Grammousa
- Gytheio
- Ierakas
- Kallithea
- Kalloni
- Kalogonia
- Kalyvia Sochas
- Kalyvia
- Kampos
- Karea
- Karitsa
- Karvelas
- Karyes
- Karyoupoli
- Kastania
- Kastania, Monemvasia
- Kastoreio
- Kefalas
- Kelefa
- Kladas
- Koita
- Kokkala
- Kokkina Louria
- Konakia
- Koniditsa
- Kotronas
- Kounos
- Koupia
- Kremasti
- Krini
- Krokees
- Kryoneri
- Kyparissi
- Lachi
- Lagi
- Lagia
- Lampokampos
- Lefkochoma
- Leimonas
- Lira
- Longanikos
- Longastra
- Lygereas
- Magoula
- Marathea
- Melissa
- Melitini
- Mesochori
- Metamorfosi
- Mina
- Molaoi
- Monemvasia
- Myrsini
- Myrtia
- Mystras
- Neapoli
- Neo Oitylo
- Neochori
- Niata
- Nomia
- Oitylo
- Pakia
- Palaiopanagia
- Palaiovrysi
- Pantanassa, Laconia
- Papadianika
- Paroreio
- Pellana
- Peristeri
- Perivolia
- Petrina
- Pistamata
- Platana
- Platanos
- Polovitsa
- Potamia
- Prosili
- Psōïnianika
- Pyrgos Dirou
- Pyrrichos
- Reichea
- Riviotissa
- Selegoudi
- Sellasia
- Sidirokastro
- Skala
- Skamnaki
- Skoura
- Skoutari
- Soustianoi
- Sparti
- Spartia
- Stefania
- Sykia
- Talanta
- Theologos
- Trapezanti
- Trypi
- Tsikkalia
- Vachos
- Vamvakou
- Varvitsa
- Vasaras
- Vasilaki
- Vasiliki
- Vatheia
- Velanidia
- Velies
- Vlachiotis
- Vordonia
- Voutianoi
- Vresthena
- Vrontamas
- Xirokampi

== By municipality ==
Elafonisos (no subdivisions)

== See also ==
- List of towns and villages in Greece
