= Cyphanta =

Coordinates: 36°58′06″N 22°59′33″E

Cyphanta or Kyphanta (Ancient Greek: τὰ Κύφαντα) was a town on the eastern coast of ancient Laconia, belonging to the Eleuthero-Lacones. It was in ruins in the time of Pausanias (2nd century), but from the notice of it in other writers, it was evidently at one period a place of some importance. Pausanias describes it as situated 6 stadia from Zarax, and 10 stadia inland; and Ptolemy speaks separately of the port-town and city. Pausanias adds that Cyphanta contained a temple of Asclepius, called Stethaeum, and a fountain issuing from a rock, said to have been produced by a blow of the lance of Atalanta. The numbers in Pausanias, however, cannot be correct. At the distance of 6 stadia from Zarax (modern Ierakas), there is no site for a town or a harbour; and it is scarcely conceivable that, on this rocky and little-frequented coast, there would be two towns so close to one another. Moreover, Pausanias says that the distance from Prasiae to Cyphanta is 200 stadia; whereas the real distance from Prasiae (modern Paralio Leonidi) to Zarax is more than 300 stadia. In addition to this Ptolemy places Cyphanta considerably further north than Zarax; and it is not till reaching Cyparissia that there is any place with a harbour and a fountain.

Modern scholars place its site near the modern Kyparissi.
