= Sykia =

Sykia or Sykea (Greek meaning fig tree) may refer to a number of places in Greece:

- Sykia, Chalkidiki, a village in the municipal unit Toroni, Chalkidiki
- Sykia, Corinthia, a village in the municipal unit Xylokastro, Corinthia
- Sykia, Imathia, a village in the municipal unit Vergina, Imathia
- Sykia, Laconia, a village in Laconia
- Sykia, Larissa, a village in the Larissa regional unit
- Sykia, Phocis, a village in the municipal unit Lidoriki, Phocis
- Sykia, Voula, a small doline near Voula in Athens

== See also ==
- Sykias or Pelekita Cave, a cave near Zakros beach, Crete, in Greece
- Sykies
