= Agioi Anargyroi (disambiguation) =

Agioi Anargyroi may refer to several places in Greece:

- Agioi Anargyroi, a suburb of Athens
- Agioi Anargyroi, Kastoria, a municipal unit in the Kastoria regional unit
- Agioi Anargyroi, Laconia, a village in the municipal unit of Therapnes, Laconia
- Agioi Anargyroi, Alonnisos, two churches near the beach of Tourkoneri, Alonnisos island, Sporades archipelago, Thessaly

== See also ==
- Holy Unmercenaries, saints known by the epithet Άγιοι Ανάργυροι
