= Archangelos, Laconia =

Archangelos Αρχάγγελος
- Settlement
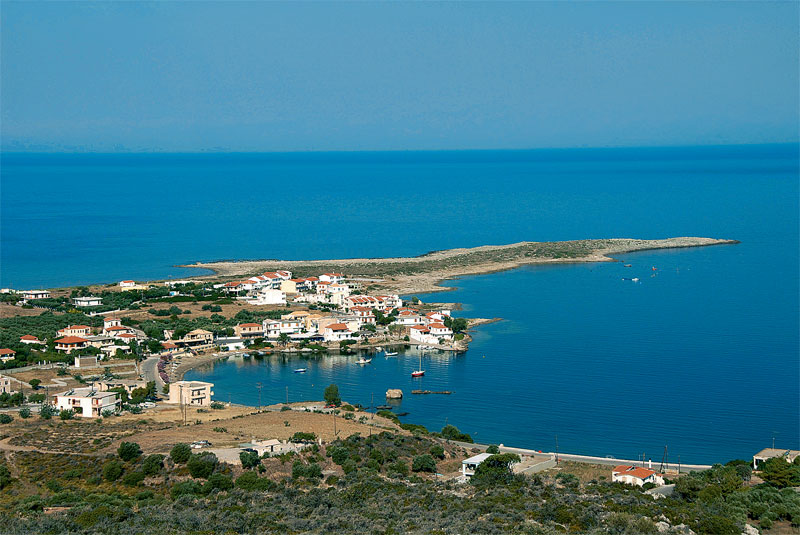
- Archangelos

- Location within Greece
- Coordinates: 36°37′N 22°52′E
- Country: Greece
- Administrative region: Peloponnese
- Regional unit: Laconia
- Municipality: Monemvasia
- Municipal unit: Asopos
- Community: Daimonia
- Elevation: 5 m (16 ft)

Population (2021)
  - Total: 50
- Time zone: UTC+2 (EET)
  - Summer (DST): UTC+3 (EEST)
- Postal code: 230 56
- Vehicle registration: AK
- Website: www.archangelos.org

Archangelos (Greek: Αρχάγγελος) is a fishing village in Laconia in the south-eastern Peloponnese. It is part of the community Daimonia within the municipal unit Asopos.

== See also ==
- List of settlements in Laconia
