= Oinountas =

Oinountas Οινούντας
- Municipal unit
- Location within the regional unit

- Location within Greece
- Coordinates: 37°10′N 22°25′E
- Country: Greece
- Administrative region: Peloponnese
- Regional unit: Laconia
- Municipality: Sparta

Area
  - Municipal unit: 301.8 km^{2} (116.5 sq mi)
- Elevation: 580 m (1,900 ft)

Population (2021)
  - Municipal unit: 1,477
  - Municipal unit density: 4.894/km^{2} (12.68/sq mi)
- Time zone: UTC+2 (EET)
  - Summer (DST): UTC+3 (EEST)
- Postal code: 230 64
- Area code: 27310
- Vehicle registration: ΑΚ

Oinountas (Greek: Οινούντας) is a former municipality in Laconia, Peloponnese, Greece. Since the 2011 local government reform it is part of the municipality Sparta, of which it is a municipal unit. The municipal unit has an area of 301.812 km^{2}. The name originates from the Oinountas, a small river that traverses the municipality.

== Subdivisions ==
The municipal unit Oinountas is subdivided into the following communities (constituent villages in brackets):

- Koniditsa (Koniditsa, Kopelia, Kouremenos)
- Sellasia
- Theologos (Agios Ioannis, Theologos, Kalyvia Theologou)
- Vamvakou (Vamvakou, Megali Vrysi)
- Varvitsa
- Vasaras (Vasaras, Veria)
- Voutianoi
- Vresthena

== Geography ==
The municipal unit Oinountas covers the area between the northeastern part of the Evrotas Valley up to the ridge of Parnon Mountain. The river Oinountas flows through the southeastern part of the municipal unit.

== History ==
The municipality Oinountas was first established in 1835, the seat of administration being Vamvakou. It was enlarged in 1840, and the seat moved to Vresthena. It was abolished in 1912, and the municipality was split into the independent communities of Vamvakou, Vresthena, Vasaras and Arachova. It was then re-founded by law 2539/1997 (Kapodistrias Plan) in 1998, covering a larger area, by the merger of the communities Sellasia (the seat of the new municipality), Vasaras, Theologos, Varvitsa, Vamvakou, Koniditsa, Voutianoi, and Vresthena.

== Historical population ==
Year	Population
1991	2,649
2001	2,625
2011	1,839
2021	1,477

== See also ==
- List of settlements in Laconia
