= Sofia Voutsaki =

Greek archaeologist

Academic background
- Education: University of Athens (BA) University of Cambridge (MPhil) (PhD)
- Thesis: Society and culture in the Mycenaean world: an analysis of mortuary practices in the Argolid, Thessaly and the Dodecanese

Academic work
- Discipline: Archaeology
- Sub-discipline: Bronze Age Aegean and Classical Greek archaeology
- Institutions: University of Groningen

Sofia Voutsaki is Professor of Greek Archaeology at the University of Groningen and a specialist in the archaeology of the Bronze Age Aegean and classical Greece. She has directed excavations and surveys in the Argolid and at the Mycenaean site of Ayios Vasileios near Sparta, and has also published works on social change, mortuary archaeology, archaeological science, and the history of 19th- and 20th-century Greek archaeology.

== Education ==
Sofia Voutsaki studied History and Archaeology at the University of Athens (1979–84), followed by an MPhil (1984–85) and PhD (1985–92) in Archaeology at the University of Cambridge. Her PhD thesis, supervised by Colin Renfrew, was entitled Society and culture in the Mycenaean world: an analysis of mortuary practices in the Argolid, Thessaly and the Dodecanese.

== Career ==
Sofia Voutsaki held a Lectureship in Archaeology in the Faculty of Classics, University of Cambridge, from 1993 to 2003, during which time she was also a senior fellow at Newnham College. Since 2003 she has worked in the Faculty of Arts in the University of Groningen, becoming Professor of Greek Archaeology in 2011. She is a member of the Dutch Institute at Athens, has directed projects on the Middle Helladic Argolid and on the Argos tumuli, and is currently the director (with Adamantia Vasilogamvrou) of the excavation of the Northern Cemetery at Ayios Vasileios, Sparta, and of the surface survey of the surrounding area. Her excavations of the Ayios Vasileios cemetery have been featured in the Greek and Dutch media. Voutsaki is an expert on the Middle Helladic period and on mortuary archaeology in particular, and in 2015 delivered a keynote address on 'Death, disembodiment and immateriality: some reflections on recent developments in mortuary theory and methodology' at the 22nd Archaeology & Theory Symposium. She also researches a wide range of themes in Aegean Bronze Age archaeology such as social change, diet, gender, and the economy, as well as the application of scientific analysis to archaeological investigations, and the history of archaeology in Greece in the 19th and 20th centuries.

== Selected publications ==
=== Books ===
- Voutsaki, S., & Cartledge, P. (2017; eds). Ancient Monuments and Modern Identities. Towards a critical history of archaeology in 19th and 20th century Greece. London: Routledge, Taylor and Francis group.
- Wiersma, C., & Voutsaki, S. (2017; eds). Social Change in Aegean Prehistory. Oxford: Oxbow.
- Voutsaki, S., & Valamoti, S. M. (2013; eds). Diet, economy and society in the ancient Greek world: Towards a better integration of archaeology and science. (Pharos Supplement; Vol. 1). Leuven: Peeters.
- Philippa-Touchais, A., Touchais, G., Voutsaki, S., & Wright, J. (2010; eds). MESOHELLADIKA: The Greek Mainland in the Middle Bronze Age. Paris/Athens: De Boccard.
- Voutsaki, S., & Killen, J. (2001; eds). Economy and politics in the Mycenaean palatial states. Cambridge: Cambridge Philological Society.

=== Articles ===
- Voutsaki, S., van den Beld, Y., & de Raaff, Y. (2018). Labour mobilization and architectural energetics in the North Cemetery at Ayios Vasilios, Laconia, Greece. In A. Brysbaert, V. Klinkenberg, & I. Vikatou (Eds.), Constructing monuments, perceiving monumentality and the economics of building: Theoretical and methodological approaches to the built environment (Vol. 2018, pp. 169–191). Leiden: Sidestone press.
- Moutafi, I., & Voutsaki, S. (2016). Commingled burials and shifting notions of the self at the onset of the Mycenaean era (1700–1500 BCE): The case of the Ayios Vasilios North Cemetery, Laconia. Journal of Archaeological Science: Reports, 10, 780–790
- Voutsaki, S. (2016). From Reciprocity to Centricity: The Middle Bronze Age in the Greek Mainland. Journal of mediterranean archaeology, 29(1), 70–78.
- Voutsaki, S. (2012). From value to meaning, from things to persons: the Grave Circles of Mycenae reconsidered. In G. Urton, & J. Papadopoulos (Eds.), The construction of value in the ancient world. (pp. 112–137). Los Angeles: UCLA, Kotsen Institute Monographs.
- Sarri, K., & Voutsaki, S. (2012). The Argos 'tumuli': A re-examination. In Ancestral landscapes: Burial mounds in the Copper and Bronze Ages (pp. 433–443). Travaux de la Maison de l'Orient, Lyon.
- Voutsaki, S., Ingvarsson-Sundstrom, A., & Dietz, S. (2012). Tumuli and social status: a re-examination of the Asine tumulus. In S. Muller Celka, & E. Borgna (Eds.), Ancestral landscapes: Burial mounds in the Copper and Bronze Ages (pp. 445–461). Travaux de la Maison de l'Orient, Lyon.
- Voutsaki, S. (2010). Agency and personhood at the onset of the Mycenaean period. Archaeological Dialogues, 17(1), 65 – 92.
- Voutsaki, S. (2010). Moral theories, Homeric questions and the shaft graves of Mycenae. A response. Archaeological Dialogues, 17(1), 105–116.
- Voutsaki, S. (2010). From the kinship economy to the palatial economy: The Argolid in the 2nd millennium BC. In D. Pullen (Ed.), Political Economies in the Aegean Bronze Age (pp. 86–111). Oxford: Oxbow.
- Voutsaki, S., Dietz, S., & Nijboer, A. (2010). Radiocarbon analysis and the history of the East Cemetery, Asine. Opuscula, 31 – 52.
- Voutsaki, S., Nijboer, A. J., Touchais, G., & Philippa-Touchais, A. (2008). Radiocarbon analysis of Middle Helladic burials from Aspis, Argos. Bulletin de Correspondance Hellénique, 130(2), 613 – 625.
- Voutsaki, S. (2005). Age and gender in the southern Greek mainland, 2000-1500 BC. Ethnographisch-Archaeologische Forschungen, 2-3, 339 – 363.
- Voutsaki, S. (2004). Lerna, 2000 – 1500 BC: a pilot analysis. Pharos. Journal of the Netherlands Institute at Athens, XI, 75 – 80.
- Voutsaki, S. (2003). Archaeology and the Construction of the Past in Nineteenth Century Greece. In H. Hokwerda (Ed.), Constructions of Greek Past: Identity and Historical Consciousness from Antiquity to the Present (pp. 231 – 255). Groningen: Egbert Forsten..
