= Ioannis Theodorakopoulos =

Greek philosopher (1900–1981)

Ioannis Theodorakopoulos (Greek: Ἰωάννης Θεοδωρακόπουλος; 28 February 1900, Vassaras, Lakonia – 20 February 1981, Athens) was a Greek philosopher.

== Biography ==
In 1920, Theodorakopoulos moved to the University of Vienna to study classical philology and philosophy. Subsequently, he continued his study of philosophy at the University of Heidelberg, where he received his doctorate in 1925.

In 1929, together with professors Konstantinos Tsatsos and Panagiotis Kanellopoulos, Theodorakopoulos established the Archive of Philosophy and Theory of Science and was appointed as professor at the newly established University of Thessaloniki (1933–1939), and at the University of Athens (1939–1968). Since 1950, and throughout these appointments, Theodorakopoulos also taught at the School of Political Science of Panteion University. He served twice as Minister of National Education and Religious Affairs under the brief premiership of Kanellopoulos in 1945 and the interim cabinet of Ioannis Paraskevopoulos in 1966.

In 1960, he became a regular member of the Academy of Athens, serving as its President in 1963 and Secretary General 1966–1981. In 1975, he established the Liberal School of Philosophy "Plethon" in his hometown of Magoula-Sparta in Lakonia, organising international conferences and symposia. These highly successful events drew participants from all over Greece, and Theodorakopoulos himself taught a series of seminars up to his death. Theodorakopoulos was published widely, including 53 books and copious articles.
