= Kyparissia (disambiguation) =

Kyparissia (Greek: Κυπαρισσία) may refer to several places and jurisdictions in Greece:

- Kyparissia, a town in Messenia (Peloponnese)
- Kyparissia, Arcadia, a town, former bishopric and Latin Catholic titular see in Arcadia (Peloponnese)
- Cyparissia (Laconia), an ancient city in Laconia (Peloponnese)
- Gulf of Kyparissia, western Peleponnese
