= Panagiotis Zographos =

Greek painter

Panagiotis Zographos was a Greek painter from Vordonia in the Peloponnese who worked from 1836 to 1839 with his two sons, under the instruction of General Makriyannis, to produce several scenes from the Greek battle for independence against the Turks. Due to a favorable initial response, lithographic reproductions were made for popular distribution. Zographos' paintings encouraged even those not directly involved in the struggle to have nationalistic feelings. Zographos' works contributed to widespread sentiments of Greek support throughout western Europe, and subsequently helped spur aid provided to the Greek Rebellion by groups like the British Committee.

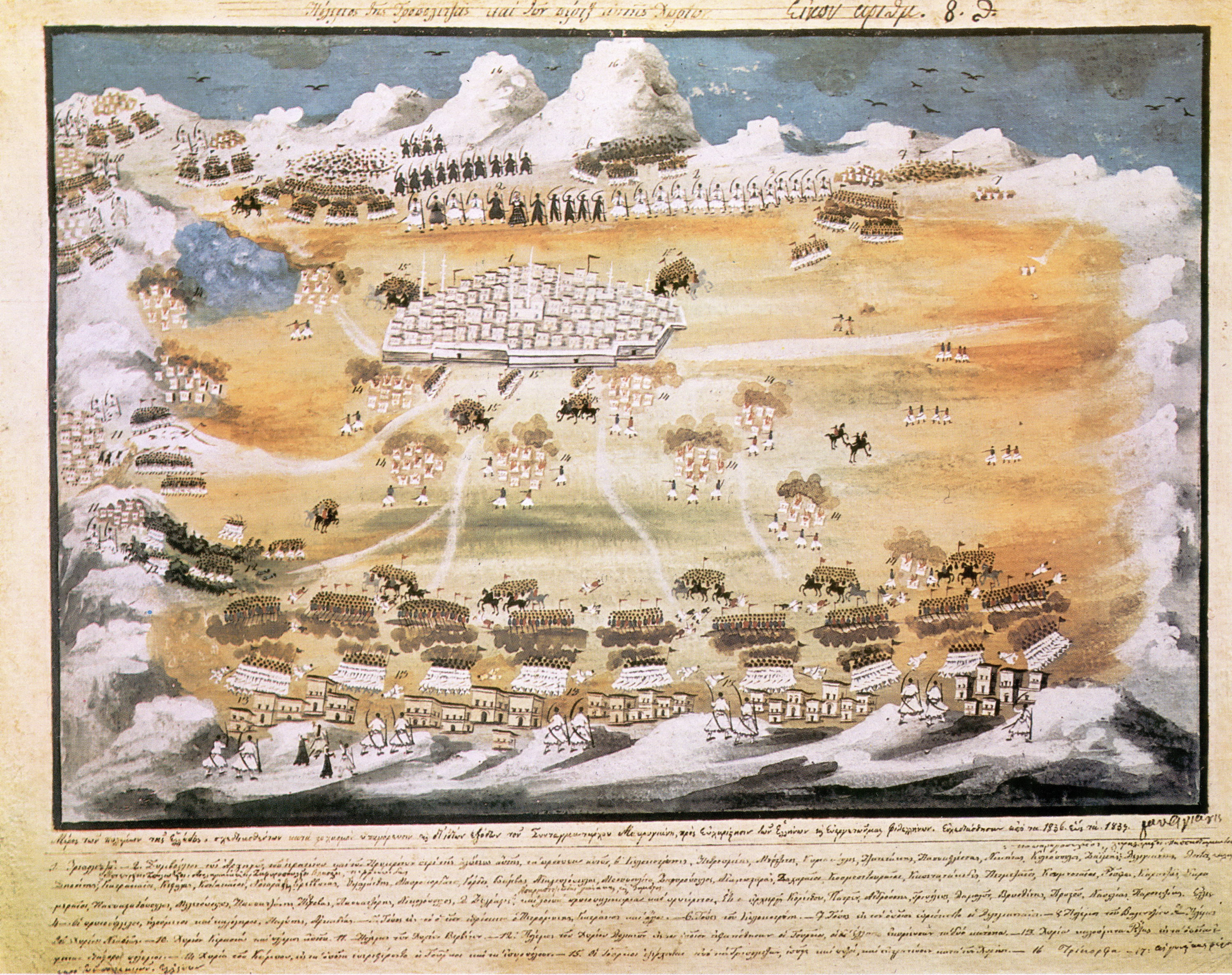
Battle of Tripolitza and surrounding villages. Painting by Zografos under guidance of General Makriyannis.

== Notes ==
- Hunt, Lynn, et al. The Making of the West, Volume C. 3rd ed. Bedford/ St. Martin's, Boston: 2009.
