= Harpleia =

Harpleia (Ancient Greek: Ἅρπλεια) was a town of ancient Laconia. Pausanias writes that it was on Mount Taygetus but at the entrance of the plain, and 20 stadia from Dereium.

Its site is unlocated, though a connection with Xirokambi has been suggested.
