= Drosopigi =

Drosopigi (Greek: Δροσοπηγή meaning "cool spring") may refer to several villages in Greece:

- Drosopigi, Corinthia, a village in the municipal unit Stymfalia, Corinthia
- Drosopigi, Evrytania, a village in the municipal unit Prousos, Evrytania
- Drosopigi, Florina, a village in the municipal unit Perasma, Florina regional unit
- Drosopigi, Ioannina, a village in the municipal unit Mastorochoria, Ioannina regional unit
- Drosopigi, Laconia, a village in the municipal unit Gytheio, Laconia
- Drosopigi, Trikala, a village in the municipal unit Pialeia, Trikala regional unit
