= Apostolos Nikolaidis (singer) =

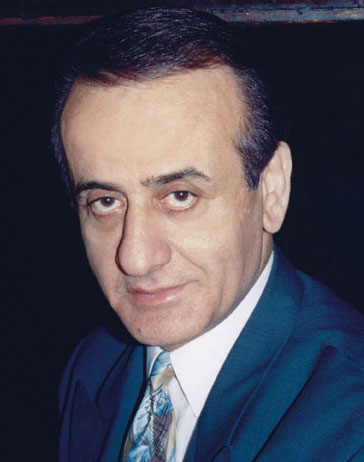
- Apostolos Nikolaidis in 1995

Background information
- Born: 30 June 1938 Drama, Greece
- Origin: Thessaloniki, Greece
- Died: 22 April 1999 (aged 60) Athens, Greece
- Genres: Laïka, Rebetika
- Occupation: Singer
- Years active: 1962–1999
- Website: www.apostolosnikolaidis.com

Apostolos Nikolaidis (Greek: Απόστολος Νικολαΐδης) (30 June 1938 – 22 April 1999) was a Greek singer whose career spanned four decades. He was born in Drama, Greece and grew up in Thessaloniki. He is best known for being the first Greek artist to record or re-record the authentic, "prohibited" rebetika songs in the early 1970s with their original lyrics at a time when this type of music was censored in Greece due to the military junta of 1967–1974 in power.

== Biography ==
Nikolaidis was of Pontic Greek origin. He first appeared on the Greek music scene in 1962, recording songs written by composers such as Manolis Chiotis, Apostolos Kaldaras, and Vassilis Tsitsanis at the famed Greek record label Columbia. Throughout the 1960s, he performed at well-known venues in Athens with many of the pre-eminent music figures of the time including Stelios Kazantzidis, Marinella, Poly Panou, Kaiti Grey, Manolis Chiotis, Apostolos Kaldaras, Giorgos Lafkas, Giannis Karabesinis, and others.

In 1968, Nikolaidis departed for Canada and the United States for a series of performances, ultimately living and working in the U.S. for more than 25 years. The prohibited rebetika (Greek "urban blues") songs he recorded and released in his adopted country in the early 1970s became his life's work, making him popular in Greek diaspora communities around the world. The long-play album "Otan Kapnizi O Loulas" (1973) became an artistic and commercial achievement for Nikolaidis, as well as an impetus for other artists and groups to follow with similar recordings of their own. About the album's impact, Cypriot journalist Nearchos Georgiades wrote: “It is to his credit that he brought these songs back first, and to a large extent to the [Greek music] catalogue, with an inimitable ‘tough’ style and color in his voice, while simultaneously giving them a contemporary sound."

During the 1970s and 1980s, Nikolaidis recorded and released a series of classic laïká and rebetika albums and embarked on tours throughout the United States, Canada, and Germany. He returned to his native Greece during the 1990s and performed on stages in Athens, Thessaloniki and Cyprus through the end of the decade. In 1996 and 1997, Nikolaidis released two albums with music by laïká composer Giorgos Manisalis.

Apostolos Nikolaidis died on 22 April 1999, in Athens from complications from cancer. In accordance with his wishes, his remains were flown back to the United States and buried there.

In March 2022, a new book in Greek and English titled "Apostolos Nikolaidis: The Authentic Laïká Singer Who Was Never Censored" was announced by Marilou Press. On 6 June 2022, the book received a highly positive review from popular Greek news and culture website LiFO.gr. In its February 2023 review, American book publishing website BookLife called it “an entertaining mixed-media celebration of an epochal Greek musician”.

== Reviews ==
In 2007, Chris Williams of fRoots magazine wrote: "Nikolaidis's musical development and style – the tough urban manner, always serious and dignified, never descending into skyladika – was hugely influenced by his social background: he began his working life as a construction worker in an age when such labourers were the vanguard of the politicised working class, rather as the miners once were in the UK. In this and much else he had a lot in common with Stelios Kazantzidis, whom he greatly admired and whose singing clearly influenced him."

About Nikolaidis's singing quality and style, Georgiades wrote the same year: "His voice is clear and manly, with its own particular flavour and superbly articulated, extending over two whole octaves without fading in the lower notes or straining at the higher ones…he is assisted by the correct breathing and the capacity of his lungs, which help him to extend his hold on the note in the final phrases. His pronunciation of consonants and especially of the vowels, tinged with his particular brand of “toughness” and sarcasm, serve to establish the distinctive ‘Nikolaidis style’."

Journalist Panos Geramanis, a leading authority on the laïká musical style's golden era, wrote in 1999: "Apostolos Nikolaidis was the man, the artist who gave new life to the rebetiko at a time when it was considered to be in decline and its creators and interpreters were officially hunted down by the state as hashish smokers and people of the underworld. Nikolaidis presented and interpreted these rebetika, pushed-aside songs with such "coolness" they made a huge impression. Soon afterward, the first "Rebetic [Music] Company" started to slowly incorporate them into their repertoire, followed by many other singers popular today."

== Discography ==
=== 1961–1967 (45RPM Singles) ===
1961–1964	1964–1966	1966–1967
Ena psihoulo storgis (recorded 1961, unreleased); Tetia apagi na mou lipi (recorded 1961, unreleased); Esi me pligoses varia (1962); O magkas (1962); Dromo perno (1962); Hameni mou hara (1962); Tora pia tipota de mas horizi (1962); Toksera mia mera (1963); I kafetzou (1963); Giati na rotiso ton kosmo (1963); To ematha-to ematha (1963); O dais (recorded 1964, unreleased); Min akous kanena (1964); Ase me ston pono mou (1964); Mavres ipopsies (1964); Mono esi mehis niosi (1964)	Esena eho ki'afto me ftani (1964); Mine sto spiti mas (1964); Rota prota ti kardia mou (1964); Krata to heri mou sfihta (1964); Mi to pernis gia astio (1965); As pethena sta psemata (1965); Sti kardia mou ali de horai (1965); Na to prosehis to pedi (1965); Magia mou kanes (1965); Ta dika sou ta hadia (1965); Sighorese patera mou (1966); Panagia mou ti eho pathi (1966); Den se thelo gia gineka (1966); Ise gia menane to pan (1966)	Stalamatia-stalamatia (1966); Apo pote allakses glikia mou (1966); Periplanomeno kormi (1966); Ti ne afto pou sou simveni (1966); Tamba toumba (1967); Petradaki-petradaki (1967); Lathos ekana megalo (1967); Eho pikro parapono (1967); O sosias tis agapis (1967); Pos na se sighoriso (1967); Krasi ke dakri (1967); Plagiasa kato apo t' asteria (1967); Asimorfoti (1967); Boemissa (1967); Eimai apopse sta merakia (1967); Rota prota ti kardia mou (1967)

=== 1969–1983 (33RPM Albums) ===
- O Gialinos Kosmos (1969)
- Otan Kapnizi O Loulas (1973)
- O Arhagelos (1975)
- Ithela Namouna Pasas (1976)
- Ston Adi Antamosane (1977)
- Ta 12 Evagelia T'Apostoli (1979)
- Den Hriazonte Logia (1982)
- Rembetikes Stigmes-Magkika Tragoudia (1983)

1991–1999 (CD Albums)

- Mia Vradia Me Ton Apostoli Live (1991)
- Ti Mou Thimises Tora (1996)
- Na Haro Magkia (1997)
- Magkia Mou Poume PAOKtzis (Single) (1998)
- Allagi Frouras (1999)

Posthumous CD Releases

- Ta Rembetika T' Apostoli – 3CD Collectors' Set (2002)
- Gi Afto Ke Zo – 11 Unreleased Tracks (2005)
- O Gialinos Kosmos – Remastered Collector's Edition (2007)

=== Film and television ===
- O Megalos Orkos (1965) Director: Stelios Tatasopoulos on YouTube
- ERT Tribute to Yiannis Papaioannou (1983) Director: Giorgos Kalogiannis on YouTube
