= Zarax =

Ancient Laconian town

Coordinates: 36°47′13″N 23°05′17″E

Zarax (Ancient Greek: Ζάραξ) or Zarex (Ζάρηξ) was a town on the eastern coast of ancient Laconia, with a good harbour, situated upon a promontory, which is a projection of Mount Zarax. Like Prasiae and some other places on this part of the Laconian coast, it passed into the hands of the Argives in the time of the Macedonian supremacy; and this was apparently the reason why it was destroyed by Cleonymus of Sparta. From this disaster it never recovered. Augustus made it one of the Eleuthero-Laconian towns; but Pausanias, who visited in the 2nd century, mentions it as being “...the most ruinous of the towns of the Free Laconians...”, owing to the devastation carried out by Cleonymus. He adds that the only remarkable building in town at the time was a Temple of Apollo, graced by “... a statue holding a lyre”.

Its site is located near the modern Ierakas, and can be accessed by following a footpath up from the modern day harbour. The remains, though scenic, are scarce, unprotected, and rapidly deteriorating.
