= Lapithaeum =

Coordinates: 36°59′22″N 22°25′48″E

Lapithaeum or Lapithaion (Ancient Greek: Λαπίθαιον) was a town of ancient Laconia. Pausanias writes that it was on Taygetus, 15 stades distant from the sanctuary of Persephone by Helos, and not far from Dereium. He writes that Lapithaeum was named after Lapithus, a native of the district.

Its site is tentatively located near the modern Anogeia.
