= Dereium =

Dereium or Dereion (Ancient Greek: Δέρειον), also known as Dera (Δέρα) and Derrhium or Derrhion (Δέρριον), was a town of ancient Laconia. Pausanias writes that it was on Taygetus not far from Lapithaeum, and 20 stadia from Harpleia. Dereium possessed an open image of Artemis Dereatis, and a spring called Anonus. The site of the town has not been located.
