= Oenus (river) =

- Native name: Οινούντας (Greek)

Location
- Country: Greece

Physical characteristics
- Mouth
  - location: Eurotas
  - coordinates: 37.09318°N 22.4266°E

Basin features
- Progression: Eurotas→ Ionian Sea

The Oenus (Ancient Greek: Οἰνοῦς, Greek: Οινούντας - Oinountas, also called Kelefina) is a river in the Peloponnese peninsula, southern Greece. It rises in the watershed of Mt. Parnon, and, after flowing in a general southwesterly direction, falls into the Eurotas, at the distance of little more than a mile from Sparta. (Polyb. ii. 65, 66; Liv. xxxiv. 28.) The principal tributary of the Oenus was the Gorgylus (Greek: Γόργυλος, Polyb. ii. 66), probably the river of Vrestená. (Leake, Peloponnesiaca, p. 347.) The municipal unit Oinountas, part of the municipality Sparta, was named after the river Oenus.
