= Kalyvia Sochas =

Kalyvia Sochas Καλύβια Σοχάς
- Community
- Location within Greece
- Coordinates: 37°01′N 22°25′E
- Country: Greece
- Administrative region: Peloponnese
- Regional unit: Laconia
- Municipality: Sparta
- Municipal unit: Sparta
- Elevation: 382 m (1,253 ft)

Population (2021)
  - Community: 287
- Time zone: UTC+2 (EET)
  - Summer (DST): UTC+3 (EEST)
- Postal code: 231 00
- Area code: 27330
- Vehicle registration: ΑΚ

Κalyvia Sochas (Greek: Καλύβια Σοχάς) is a village in Laconia, in southern Greece. It is part of the municipal unit Sparta. Kalyvia Sochas is situated 6.5 km south of the centre of Sparta.

== Historical population ==
Year	Population
1981	384
1991	295
2011	337
2021	297

== See also ==
- List of settlements in Laconia
