= Pyrrichos =

Pyrrichos Πύρριχος
- Community
- Location within Greece
- Coordinates: 36°39.4′N 22°26.1′E
- Country: Greece
- Administrative region: Peloponnese
- Regional unit: Laconia
- Municipality: East Mani
- Municipal unit: East Mani
- Elevation: 400 m (1,300 ft)

Population (2021)
  - Community: 65
- Time zone: UTC+2 (EET)
  - Summer (DST): UTC+3 (EEST)
- Postal code: 230 66
- Area code: 27330
- Vehicle registration: ΑΚ

Pyrrichos (Greek: Πύρριχος; called "Πούρρχο", Pourcho by local Maniots) is one of the oldest towns in Mani peninsula, Laconia, Greece. It is part of the municipal unit East Mani. It was promised to Achilles by the Achaeans if he took part in the Trojan War.

== Name ==
According to one tradition Pyrrichos was named after Pyrrhichos, the legendary Laconian founder of Pyrrhichus.

According to another tradition Pyrrhichios was named after the son of Achilles, Pyrrhus (Πύρρος) (alternative name of Neoptolemus), who was the first who danced Pyrrhichus, after defeating in battle Eurypylus, son of Telephus, who fought on the side of the Trojans during the end of the Trojan War.

Another legend say that the name is after the Pyrrhichus who was one of the gods called Curetes.

== Historical population ==
Year	Population
1981	98
1991	58
2001	79
2011	57
2021	65

== See also ==
- List of settlements in Laconia
