= Adamantia Vasilogamvrou =

Greek archaeologist

- Αδαμαντία Βασιλογάμβρου
- Education: National and Kapodistrian University of Athens; Sorbonne University
- Scientific career
- Fields: Archaeology
- Institutions: Ministry of Culture and Sports

Adamantia Vasilogamvrou (Greek: Αδαμαντία Βασιλογάμβρου) is a Greek archaeologist. She studied at the universities of Athens and the Sorbonne and worked as an archaeologist for the Greek Ministry of Culture and Sports for 35 years. She is Honorary Ephor of Antiquities in the Ephorate of Laconia and director of the archaeological excavations and surveys at the site of Agios Vasileios, a Mycenaean palace discovered near Sparta in 2009. Her work at Ayios Vasileios has been featured in the Greek media and the palace's discovery was chosen as one of the 10 most important archaeological discoveries worldwide by the 2013 Shanghai Archaeology Forum.

== Publications ==
- Voutsaki, Sofia, Wiersma, C., De Neef, W., & Vasilogamvrou, A. (2019). The Ayios Vasileios survey project (Laconia, Greece) : questions, aims and methods. Journal of Greek Archaeology, 4, 67–95
- Voutsaki, Sofia, Moutafi, Ioanna, Vasilogamvrou, A., & Kondyli, D. (2020), "ΤΟ ΒΟΡΕΙΟ ΝΕΚΡΟΤΑΦΕΙΟ ΣΤΟΝ ΑΓΙΟ ΒΑΣΙΛΕΙΟ ΛΑΚΩΝΙΑΣ ΚΑΙ Η ΕΞΕΛΙΞΗ ΤΩΝ ΤΑΦΙΚΩΝ ΕΘΙΜΩΝ ΣΤΗΝ ΑΡΧΗ ΤΗΣ ΜΥΚΗΝΑΪΚΗΣ ΠΕΡΙΟΔΟΥ" ('The North Cemetery at Ayios Basileios in Laconia and the development of burial customs at the beginning of the Mycenaean period')", in ΖΥΜΗ, Ε., ΚΑΡΑΠΑΝΑΓΙΩΤΟΥ Α-Β., ΞΑΝΘΟΠΟΥΛΟΥ, Μ. (eds), ΤΟ ΑΡΧΑΙΟΛΟΓΙΚΟ ΕΡΓΟ ΣΤΗΝ ΠΕΛΟΠΟΝΝΗΣΟ (ΑΕΠΕΛ 1). Πρακτικά του Διεθνούς Συνεδρίου, Τρίπολη 7-11 Νοεμβρίου 2012. (pp. 91-99).
- Aravantinos, Vassilis L., and Vasilogamvrou, Adamantia (2012), "The first Linear B documents from Ayios Vasileios (Laconia)", in Carlier, Pierre, de Lamberterie, Charles, Egetmeyer, Markus, Guilleux, Nicole, Rougemont, Françoise, and Zurbach, Julien (eds) Études mycéniennes 2010. Actes du XIII^{e} colloque international sur les textes égéens. Sèvres, Paris, Nanterre, 20-23 septembre 2010, Biblioteca di "Pasiphae" 10 (Pisa/Roma: Fabrizio Serra), 41-54
