= Vresthena =

Vresthena Βρέσθενα
- Community
- Location within Greece
- Coordinates: 37°13.6′N 22°29.8′E
- Country: Greece
- Administrative region: Peloponnese
- Regional unit: Laconia
- Municipality: Sparti
- Municipal unit: Oinountas

Population (2021)
  - Community: 333
- Time zone: UTC+2 (EET)
  - Summer (DST): UTC+3 (EEST)
- Postal code: 230 69
- Area code: 27310
- Vehicle registration: ΑΚ

Vresthena (Greek: Βρέσθενα) is a small village in the Parnon mountains, Laconia, Greece. It is part of the municipality of Sparta.

== See also ==
- List of settlements in Laconia
