= Metamorfosi, Laconia =

Metamorfosi Μεταμόρφωση
- Community
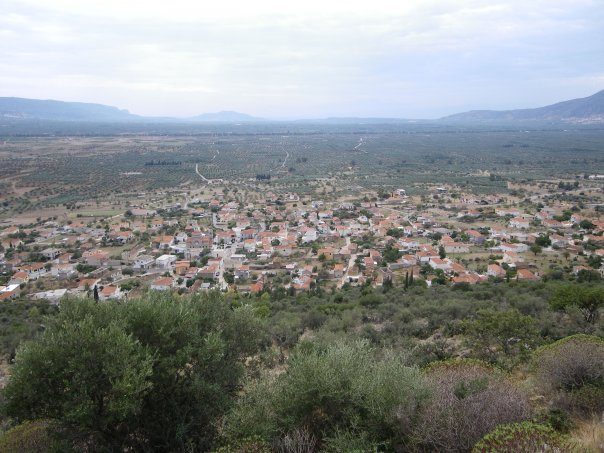
- Panoramic view of the village by the foot of the mountain Koulochera

- Location within Greece
- Coordinates: 36°48′22″N 22°54′58″E
- Country: Greece
- Administrative region: Peloponnese
- Regional unit: Laconia
- Municipality: Monemvasia
- Municipal unit: Molaoi

Population (2021)
  - Community: 504
- Time zone: UTC+2 (EET)
  - Summer (DST): UTC+3 (EEST)
- Postal code: 230 52
- Vehicle registration: AK

Metamorfosi (Greek: Μεταμόρφωση) is a village in Laconia, five kilometers from the center of Molaoi and about seventy-eight kilometers southeast of Sparta. The village is built at the foot of the mountain of Koulochera on the outskirts of the Parnon range. Its altitude is 120 meters. According to the 2021 census, Metamorfosi has 504 residents. Before 1961, the village was known as Katavothra (sinkhole) due to a natural hole in the ground outside the village where rainwater collected.

== History ==
It is believed that an ancient town named Lefki (Λεύκη) existed at the northern end of the Asopos plain and that a river, named Asopos or Lefki, flowed through the middle of this plain. In a devastating earthquake in AD 375, the river disappeared underground, forming the natural hole at the northeast end of the plain. In the flat outskirts of the village, near the modern public school and cemetery, are three areas where artifacts from Byzantine and Roman times have been found. These archaeological finds most likely indicate the original site of the village.

It appears that the inhabitants of Laconia in the early Bronze Age were a Pre-Hellenic people called Leleges, who made a living by hunting and farming. In 3000 BC the Acheans, a Hellenic race, came from the north and settled in Laconia establishing strong commercial centers close to the shoreline. In 1100 BC, the Dorians invaded the area, and this period comes to be known as the Spartan Years that lasted until 146 BC. During this time these centers lost their autonomy and were brought under the "guardianship" of Sparta. In 146 BC, eighteen Laconic cities including Gythio, Asopos, and Epidavros Limira, declared their independence from Sparta and establish an independent federation, the Union of the Free Laconians. The Romans who dominated the area in 27 AD, granted this federation many privileges and freedoms and the region of Epidavros Limira flourished greatly and experienced its own "golden age".

In 375 AD, severe earthquakes shook the Laconic lands and completely destroyed major centers like Asopos and Epidavros Limira. In their place, the new focal city of Monemvasia was created and in the Byzantine years that followed, from 395 to 1210, this region continued to grow and flourish. Twenty years following the earthquakes the Goths arrived and looted the area. Barbarian invasions greatly decreased the population and by the 8th century, Slaves settle the highlands of Laconia bringing further conflict and insecurity to the region. Due to these barbarian invasions from the north, many villages in the surrounding areas were deserted by their inhabitants who sought refuge and better defense on higher grounds. In this manner, around the 10th century, the Katavothrians relocated close to the foot of the hill which is the present site of the village.

When the Crusaders invaded Constantinople in 1204, the region fell to the Franks, who ruled there from 1210 to 1259. With the re-establishment of the Byzantine Empire, in 1259, the region experienced new growth and prosperity and the sparsely populated villages established themselves under the protection of Monemvasia until 1347, and later under the mighty Domain of Mystra until 1460. At this time, the bishop of Mystra allowed the emigration and settlement of 10,000 Albanians in the general vicinity of Mystra, some of whom settled in Katavothra and adopted their new land as their own, making a living as shepherds. English historians Vace and Hasluck (BSA volume 12 pg. 146–160) refer to this Albanian settlement, "... Albanians inhabited the area that included the villages called Geraka, Rehia, Niata, Harakas, Kyparissi, Kremasti, Giotsali, Geraki, Katavothra and Sikia".

After the Fall of Constantinople, Emperor Mohammed II in 1460, occupied Laconia, the fortress of Mystra and all the surrounding area. The Ottomans controlled the region for the next 360 years, excluding a period from 1684 to 1715, when the Venetians dominated Laconia. In the years of Ottoman rule, the Turks were drawn to settle in Katavothra due to its abundant cultivated land and its very productive vineyards. In this manner, before the War of Independence in 1821, fifteen Turkish families and thirty-six Greek families resided in Katavothra. Most of the fertile land was taken by the Turks, with less fertile land falling to the Christians.

Under Venetian rule, the Laconians paid heavy taxes and were subjected to Venetian attempts to convert to Catholicism. The Venetians were responsible for much of the economic and cultural improvements in the area. This is exemplified by the systematic cultivation of the olive tree and the growth of the population in Katavothra, which by 1700 had risen to 128, comprising thirty-two families, compared with fifteen families seventy years earlier.

The Turks reclaimed Laconia in 1715. In 1770, the enslaved Greeks rebelled under the protection of Russia. The Peloponnesus, especially Laconia and Messinia fought courageously, but the Turks called for the help of Turkish Albanians; the Arvanites, who brought immense devastation to the Greek uprisings by burning whole villages to the ground and butchering the inhabitants or selling them as slaves in the slave trade of the East. Many of the villagers went into hiding in caves and in the mountains, and others escaped to Hydra, Spetses, Russia, and Asia Minor. Cultivation stopped, productivity fell to one third and only shepherds were left to view the devastated villages. After nine years, in 1779, Greek guerrillas and Turks were able to neutralize the Albanians. Turkish rule continued with heavy taxation but with relative calm until the 1821 revolution.

On March 22, 1821, the Turks living in Katavothra, fearing the coming of the revolution, barricaded themselves in the castle of Monemvasia. The Greeks, including many Katavothrians, seized the castle on March 29 and forced the Turks to surrender. Ibrahim Pasha was sent to quell the uprisings in the Peloponnesus in 1825, and with Tripolis as his headquarters, he went on severe campaigns to destroy all the villages of Laconia, including Katavothra.

The long-awaited independence finally came with the arrival of Kapodistrias in January 1828 and with the withdrawal of the ruthless Ibrahim forces. In 1830, Hellas was declared a nation. Thus, in 1928 Katavothra had 761 inhabitants. Many families who had left the village returned, such as the Roumanis from Spetses, the Laggis from Crete and the Batsakis from Zaraka.

The year 1927 completed the construction of a primary school. A two-class school remains active and is home to students of E or F grade from the village, as well as from neighboring Sykea. Students of other classes are transported every day and attend classes at the Elementary School in Sykea.

In 1961 the village was renamed Metamorphosi with the completion of the new church, named Metamorphosis of Christ. The new church was built in place of the old with the help of expatriates from abroad and the personal work of the villagers.

== Religious life ==
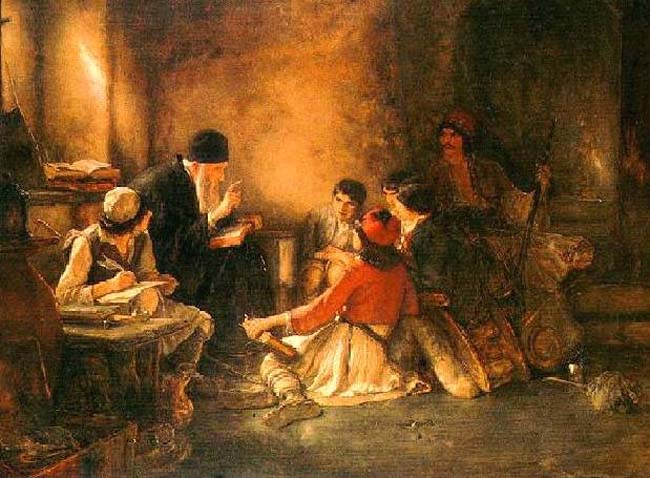
Nikolaos Gyzis, "To krifó scholió", Oil painting, 1885/86.

Despite the immense pressure exerted by the Turks, no villager ever converted to Islam. The oldest church in Metamorfosi is the church of St. Georgios in the cemetery which was built in the middle of the Byzantine era. Marble and old Roman columns were used in its construction. It served as a hiding place for many throughout the years, and according to some, it served as a krifo scholio under Turkish rule. The original church was torn down and rebuilt, losing its original Byzantine architecture.

In later years and in the middle of the present-day square, the church of Panagia was built. South of the church lay the village square with a few cypresses and lilac trees. Most village festivities were held in the square, especially during the Easter holiday. This church was demolished in 1922 and a new, larger one was built to accommodate the increasing population and it was dedicated to the Metamorfosis of Christ. This church was built with a dome and decorated with precious icons and hand-carved wood. Many of the icons as well as the holy articles were donated to the church by the Roumanis and Manolakakis families from Odessa. Most of these items were distributed to large city centres and museums in 1967 when this church was also demolished for the construction of the present-day one.

== Places of interest ==
On one side is the village is a valley with a variety of vegetation, and on the other mountains, which have been declared a protected area and are sources of wealth and in places are suitable for walking and meditation.

Another point of interest is a natural sink, 1,300 meters southeast of the village, with the surrounding meadow and wetland in Vothana. In this wetland, there are a number of species of flora and fauna (especially birds) periodically and presents scientific interest. Another natural attraction is the Tsakonas stream to the west of the village, located in a quiet canyon.

To add to the natural landscape of the region, there are also a number of churches and historic sites which add architectural interest. These include St. John, the chapel of St. Nicholas, St. Marina and St. Gregory which are examples of the faith of the villagers. Another area is "Pigadia" (English: Wells) on the southern boundaries of the settlement. This is an area where traditional watermills have been restored.

Of particular interest is the cave "Trypa tou Voria" (English: Hole of the North) which was discovered by the Italian Speleological Group "SPARVIERE" in the late 1990s. It has many stalagmites and stalactites, and the cavern is so large that the village is built on a section of the cave.

== Climate ==
The climate in Metamorfosi is Mediterranean, characterized by the alternation of a wet and cold period with a dry and warm period. A feature of the village's weather is the strong northerly wind.

== Nearest places ==
- Molaoi
- Sykea
- Monemvasia
- Elafonisos
- Voies
- Cythera
- Sparti

== Notable people ==
- Giorgos Lafkas (1919–1972), singer/songwriter
