= Zarakas =

Zarakas Ζάρακας
- Municipal unit
- Location within the regional unit

- Location within Greece
- Coordinates: 36°51′N 23°00′E
- Country: Greece
- Administrative region: Peloponnese
- Regional unit: Laconia
- Municipality: Monemvasia

Area
  - Municipal unit: 237.2 km^{2} (91.6 sq mi)

Population (2021)
  - Municipal unit: 1,179
  - Municipal unit density: 4.970/km^{2} (12.87/sq mi)
- Time zone: UTC+2 (EET)
  - Summer (DST): UTC+3 (EEST)
- Vehicle registration: AK

Zarakas (Greek: Ζάρακας) is a municipal unit and a former municipality in Laconia, Peloponnese, Greece. Since the 2011 local government reform it is part of the Monemvasia municipality. The municipal unit has an area of 237.226 km^{2}. Population 1,179 (2021). The seat of the municipality was in the town of Reichea.

The municipal unit consists of the following local communities (constituent villages between brackets):

- Charakas
- Ierakas (Agios Ioannis, Ariana, Ierakas, Limenas Ierakos, Longari)
- Kyparissi (Kapsala, Kyparissi, Mitropoli, Paralia)
- Lampokampos (Lampokampos, Pistamata)
- Reichea (Belesaiika, Reichea)
