= Pistamata =

Pistamata Πιστάματα
- Settlement
- Location within Greece
- Coordinates: 36°53.9′N 22°59.5′E
- Country: Greece
- Administrative region: Peloponnese
- Regional unit: Laconia
- Municipality: Monemvasia
- Municipal unit: Zarakas
- Community: Lampokampos
- Elevation: 467 m (1,532 ft)

Population (2021)
  - Total: 31
- Time zone: UTC+2 (EET)
  - Summer (DST): UTC+3 (EEST)

Pistamata (Greek: Πιστάματα) is a hill village in northern Monemvasia municipality, Laconia, Greece. The village is located on a small peninsula off the east coast of the Peloponnese on the road between the villages of Charakas and Lampokampos. Before the governmental reorganization of 2011, Pistamata was in the Zarakas municipality, and it remains in the Zarakas subunit.

Part of the population is of Arvanites origin being today hellenized.

On 30 August 1926, Pistamata suffered a magnitude 7.1 earthquake.
