= Gkoritsa =

Village in Laconia, Greece

Gkoritsa Γκοριτσά
- Settlement
- Location within Greece
- Coordinates: 37°01′45″N 22°33′51″E
- Country: Greece
- Administrative region: Peloponnese
- Regional unit: Laconia
- Municipality: Sparta
- Municipal unit: Therapnes
- Elevation: 341 m (1,119 ft)
- Time zone: UTC+2 (EET)
  - Summer (DST): UTC+3 (EEST)

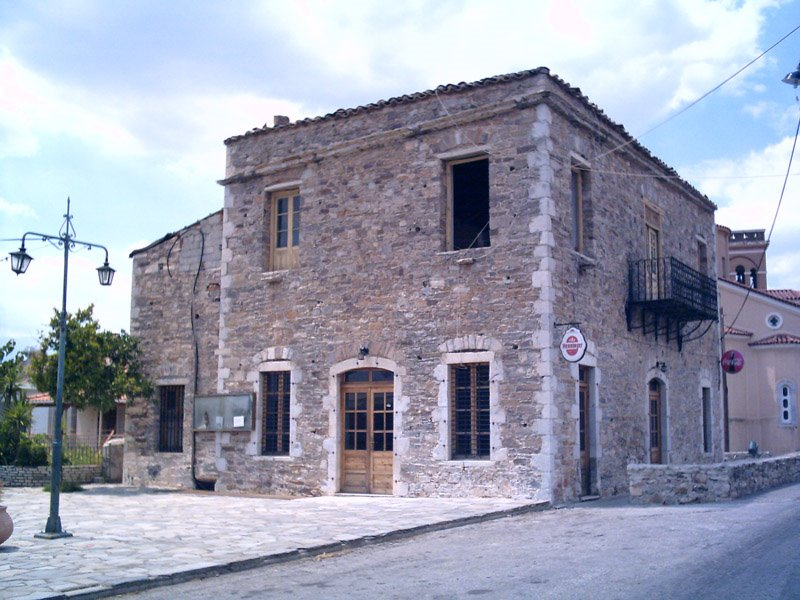
Gkoritsa square in 2009

Gkoritsa or Goritsa (Greek: Γκοριτσά, officially η Γκοριτσά) is village in the foothills of the Parnon mountain range in the Peloponnese region of Greece. The settlement in a part of the Therapnes municipal unit of the regional unit of Laconia, a subdivision of the Sparta municipality. During the Kapodistrias program (1997–2010), it was the seat of Therapnes while during the Kallikratis program (2010–present), it is a seat of Sparta municipality. Gkoritsa and Polydroso (also known as Tsintzina) make up the Gkoritsa municipal district. Its elevation is around 341 m (1,119 ft).

== Etymology ==
Gkoritsa is named after a large Crataegus azarolus, called gortsia in Greece, in the oldest part of the village.

== History ==
=== Formation and Early Land Acquisition ===
Gkoritsa and nearby villages like Agioi Anargyroi, emerged as the Tsintzinians from the village of Tsintzina migrated into the Lakonia Plains starting in the late 1700s. They obtained Gkoritsa's Ottoman occupied and controlled land once Greece gained domestic sovereignty as the outcome of the Greek War of Independence (1821–1829). Nikos L. Andritsakis's collection of accounts (many published in the Ta Tsintzina newspaper) suggests wealthier and prominent families acquired much of the fertile and desirable land while poorer families obtained inferior land.

=== Developments ===
==== Land, Agricultural, and Economic ====
By the end of the 1800s, Gkoritsa included around 100 houses, with few being taller than one story. In 1901, Gkoritsotans led by Dr. K. Gerasimos negotiated with the Mavromichalis family for a plot of land south of the village, increasing the total village estate nearly one third. The new land increased olive harvesting and olive oil production. Following this increase in 1902, Spiros. P. Andritsakis, K. Doskas, N.I. Grigoris, K. Koutris, Mathaios I. Mathaios, D.K. Nestopoulos, P.I. Oikonomou, D. Vamvalis created the village's first steam-operated olive press. They brought the necessary equipment and materials 6 miles with rope, loges, a mule train along a mule path connecting Skoura and Gkoritsa, and the assistance of Skoura and Kefala villagers. In the mid-1930s, around 100 Gkoritsotans led by Dr. P. Gregoris produced a faster diesel olive press. In the late 1950s, the steam and diesel press corporations merged and the steam press was cleared out and the building was repurposed for storage.

==== Infrastructural ====
From 1857 to 1861, there was a significant effort by the Gkoritsa to build a church. The marble-stones which tiled the church and its yard were created in Athens, shipped to the port of Gytheio, and the brought to the village. The church's three bells were cast in Russia. In the 1930s, the largest bell cracked. After World War II, overseen by Gkoritsa priest, Reverend Nikolaos Papadopoulos, the cracked bell was transported to Moutsopoulos Steelworks in Sparta. There it was melted down and recast. The land for the church was donated by the Politis family.

In 1905, Anastassios Anastasopoulos, funded a secondary education institution called the Scolarcheio, which operated until the 1930s. In 1923, construction of a motorized road between Skoura and Gkoritsa began and was finished in 3 years. In 1925, with funding and engineering support, building commenced to create an aqueduct system to bring water to Gkoritsa from the area around Haraka. Under Dimitar Maiskim, Gkoritsa's mayor from 1954 to 1979, there was construction of a water supply network, bakery, a stadium, a children's home, a public bath, a community center, an Agricultural school, and bridges.

== Wildfires ==
In late August to early September 2007, fire spread in the Tsintzina region. Gkoritsa's fire damages includes 3,707 acres (1,500 ha) of grazing fields, 210 acres (85 ha) of olive grove, 50 beehives, five stables and one storage house. The village lost 15% of its olive grove.

== Demographics ==
Gkoritsa's population has been declining since at least 1981.

Year	Population
1981	878
1991	771
2001	686
2011	589
2021	468

== Points of interest ==
Archangel Michael Church, Gkoritsa's square, Goritsa Motorcycle Museum/Attraction (Μουσείο δικύκλων Γκοριτσάς), Poulos Café bar, and various churches.
