= Magoula =

Magoula Μαγούλα
- Community
- Location within Greece
- Coordinates: 37°5′N 22°24′E
- Country: Greece
- Administrative region: Peloponnese
- Regional unit: Laconia
- Municipality: Sparti
- Municipal unit: Mystras

Population (2021)
  - Community: 1,566
- Time zone: UTC+2 (EET)
  - Summer (DST): UTC+3 (EEST)
- Area code: 2731
- Vehicle registration: AK

Magoula (Greek: Μαγούλα) is a district of modern Sparta city in Laconia, Greece. It is the former seat of the Mystras municipality. It is basically the evolution of a small village that has been attached to the growing Sparta city. It is an aristocratic area and the centre of the ancient city of Sparta.

== Overview ==
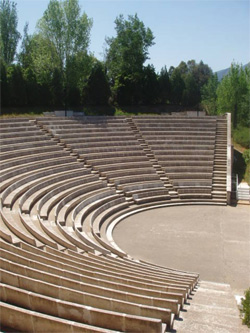
Sainopouleio Theatre, located in Magoula.

It is said that it was named after the word 'magus' (μάγος) which describes something magical and extremely beautiful. It is a wealthy, chic district and a prestigious place to live. Many similarities to Kifissia and Drafi can be found. Sainopouleio is located in Magoula, which is a famous open theatre where important festivals (ancient plays) are taking place. Sainopouleio was described by Manos Hadjidakis as the most beautiful theatre of Greece after the one in Epidaurus (Epidavros).

The school of philosophy "Plithon" founded by the academic Ioannis Theodorakopoulos is also located in Magoula.

== Notes ==
- Municipality of Mystras
