= Sykia (Voula) =

Doline in Attica, Greece

- Sykia Thrakia
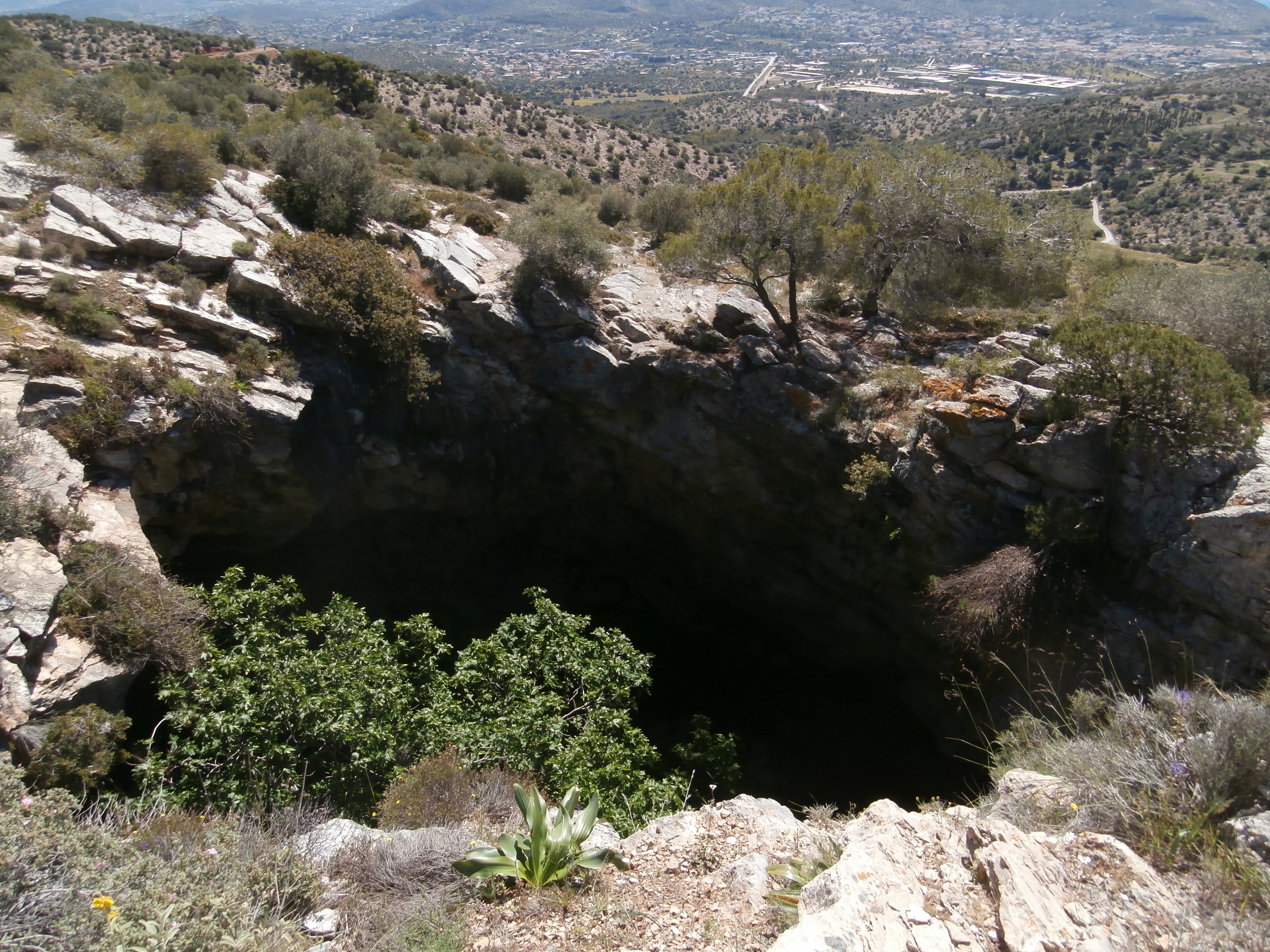
- View of the doline from atop
- Interactive map of Sykia
- Location: near the cemetery of Voula in Athens, Greece
- Coordinates: 37.8593°N 23.7970°E
- Depth: 20 metres (66 ft)
- Length: 54 metres (177 ft)
- Elevation: 300 metres (980 ft)

Sykia (Greek: Συκιά, Sykia) is a small doline in Athens, Greece.

The doline, which has a depth of about 20 metres (66 ft), has been known since the mid-1940s and is located near the Hymettan peak of Korakovouni at an altitude of approximately 300 m above sea level. It takes its name from the fig tree growing in the debris cone on the doline floor. It is next to the asphalt road continuing from the cemetery of Voula.

The doline was first recorded by a British airman immediately following the Second World War and was investigated soon after. It is now frequently used as a good practice area for single rope technique by Athenian caving clubs. It lies very close to the better known Vari Cave.
