= Therapnes =

Therapnes Θεράπνες
- Municipal unit
- Location within the regional unit

- Location within Greece
- Coordinates: 37°05′N 22°33′E
- Country: Greece
- Administrative region: Peloponnese
- Regional unit: Laconia
- Municipality: Sparti

Area
  - Municipal unit: 261.7 km^{2} (101.0 sq mi)

Population (2021)
  - Municipal unit: 2,025
  - Municipal unit density: 7.738/km^{2} (20.04/sq mi)
- Time zone: UTC+2 (EET)
  - Summer (DST): UTC+3 (EEST)
- Vehicle registration: AK

Therapnes (Greek: Θεράπνες) is a municipal unit (dimotiki enotita) of the municipality (dimos) of Sparti within the regional unit (perifereiaki enotita) of Laconia in the region (perifereia) of Peloponnese, one of 13 regions into which Greece has been divided. The municipal unit has an area of 261.711 km^{2}. Before 2011 Therapnes was a Demos of Lakonia according to Law 2539 of 1997, the Kapodistria Plan. Its seat was Gkoritsa, which now has no such status. Within its borders lies the ancient town of Therapne.

Both before the Kallikratis law and after it, Therapnes was composed of the same eight Local Communities (topiki koinotita), the lowest level of the hierarchy: Agioi Anargyroi (formerly Zouraina), Agrianoi, Gkoritsa, Kalloni, Kefalas, Platana, Skoura and Chrysafa. The population of Therapnes in the 2021 census, conducted by the Ministry of the Interior, was 2,025.

== Villages ==
- Goritsa
- Hrysafa
- Agioi Anargyroi (previously Zoupena)
- Perepni
- Skoura
- Platana
- Zagana
- Tsintzina
- Agrianoi

== Geography ==
Therapnes covers the hill country on the east bank of the Eurotas River northeast to the slopes of Mt. Parnon. The Local Communities are each centered around a village. Each village has a history of its own, but the basis making Therapnes a distinct unit is the presence of the ruins of ancient Therapne, a Bronze Age city that stood on a ridge on the left bank of the Eurotas River, overlooking the Eurotas Valley and the site of Dorian Sparta, today's city of Sparti. The villages of Therapnes are in essence on or near the old road that led from Therapne or Dorian Sparta over Platanaki Pass just south of the main peak of Parnon to what is now South Kynouria in the eastern foreland of Parnonas and the Argolic and Myrtoan Gulfs. The pass connected Bronze Age Mycenae with its sister kingdom, Lacedaemon.

The ridge has an elevation of about 500 metres (1,600 feet). Its eminence over the river is about 230 metres (750 feet). From the top of the ridge the valley below appears as a sunken bowl between Mount Taygetus and Therapne, hence the Homeric epithet "Hollow Lacedaemon." There is no standard modern name of the ridge. Some refer to it as Mount Menelaus after the Menelaion, a temple that stood on the ridge, or the Menelaus Ridge, and others Mount Therapne.

== Bronze Age Therapne ==
=== Mycenaean town ===
Therapne was among the most ancient communities of Greece. During the Bronze Age there was a large settlement at Therapne, with shrines to Menelaus and Helen.

=== Therapne in legend ===
In mythological terms, it was said to derive its name from a nymph Therapne, daughter of Lelex, and Castor and Pollux were thought to have been born there. While Pausanias writes that Therapne has "a Temple of Menelaos" (3.19.9), Herodotus (6.61) calls the same building the temple of Helen.
