= Vamvakou =

Village in Laconia, Greece

Vamvakou Βαμβακού
- Community
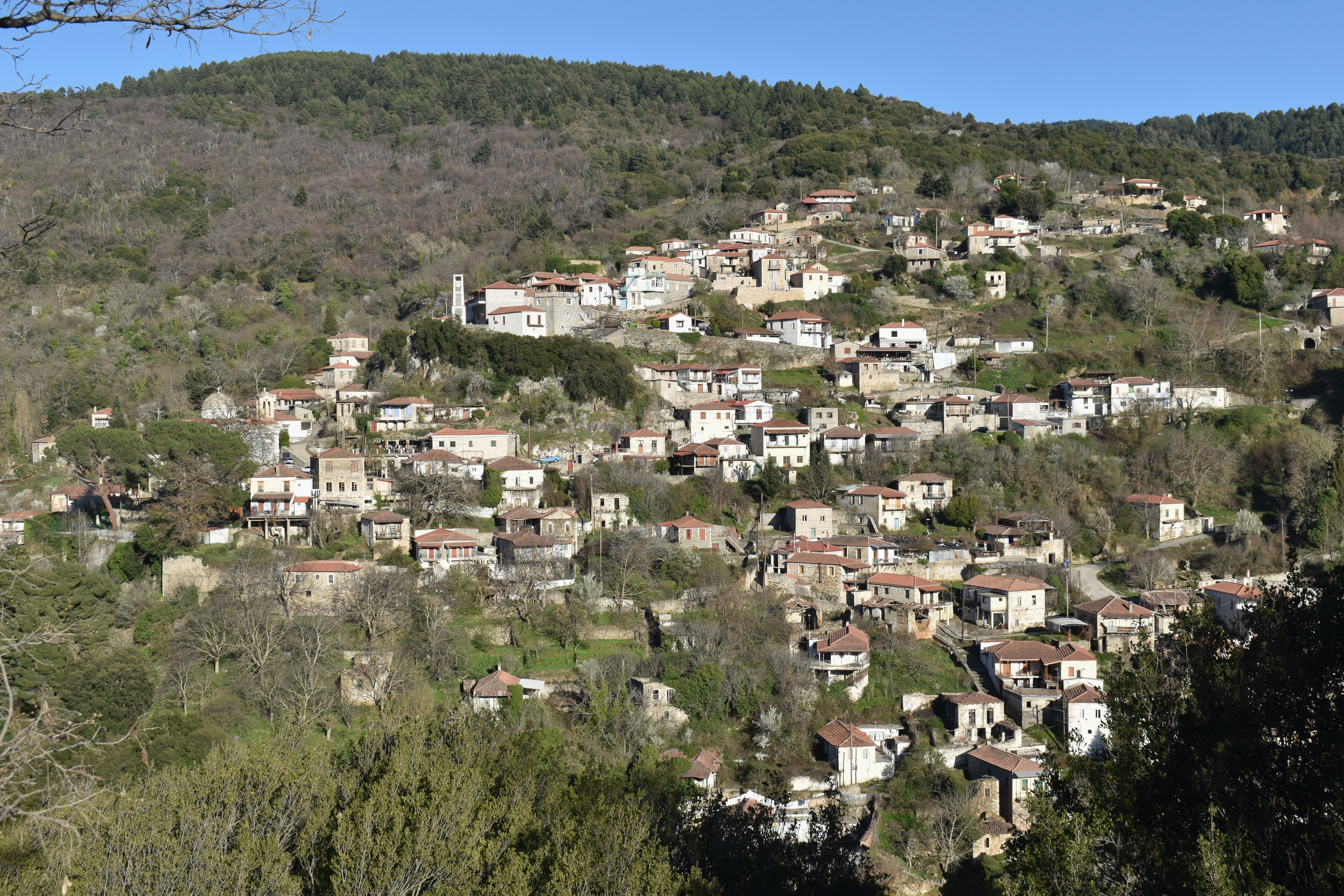
- Vamvakou

- Location within Greece
- Coordinates: 37°14′40″N 22°33′10″E
- Country: Greece
- Administrative region: Peloponnese
- Regional unit: Laconia
- Municipality: Sparti
- Municipal unit: Oinountas

Population (2021)
  - Community: 82
- Time zone: UTC+2 (EET)
  - Summer (DST): UTC+3 (EEST)

Vamvakou (Greek: Βαμβακού) is a village in Laconia in the Peloponnese, Greece. As of 2021, it had a population of 82. It is notable as the birthplace of the parents of Stavros Niarchos and Ioannis Coumantaros who founded two of Greece's most powerful shipping dynasties. Long suffering from population decline as villagers migrated to the cities and abroad, it has recently been the site of a large scale investment sponsored by the Stavros Niarchos Foundation with the goal of attracting new residents.
