= Prasiae =

Ruined Spartan port town in Laconia in ancient Greece that was sacked by Athens

Coordinates: 37°08′56″N 22°52′55″E

Prasiae or Prasiai (Ancient Greek: Πρασιαί), or Prasia (Πρασία), also known as Brasiae or Brasiai (Βρασιαί), was a town on the eastern coast of ancient Laconia, described by Pausanias as the farthest of the Eleuthero-Laconian places on this part of the coast, and as distant 200 stadia by sea from Cyphanta. The Periplus of Pseudo-Scylax speaks of it as a city and a harbour.

== Name of the city ==
The name of the town was derived by the inhabitants from the noise of the waves (Βράζειν). Pausanias relates a story, found nowhere else in Greece, that Semele, after giving birth to her son by Zeus, was discovered by Cadmus and put with Dionysus into a chest, which was washed up by the waves at Prasiae. Semele, who was no longer alive when found, received a splendid funeral, but the Prasiaeans brought up Dionysus and changed the name of their town from Oreiatae or Oreiatai (Ὀρειάταί) to Brasiae. (Note: It has been suggested, however, that this tale borrowed motifs from the story of Danae and Perseus.)

== Later history ==
It was an important Spartan naval base during the Peloponnesian War. It was burnt by the Athenians in the second year of the Peloponnesian War, 430 BCE. Also in 414 BCE, the Athenians, in conjunction with the Argives, ravaged the coast near Prasiae. In the Macedonian period Prasiae, with other Laconian towns on this coast, passed into the hands of the Argives; whence Strabo calls it one of the Argive towns, though in another passage he says that it belonged at an earlier period to the Lacedaemonians. It was restored to Laconia by Augustus, who made it one of the Eleuthero-Laconian towns. Among the curiosities of Prasiae Pausanias mentions a cave where Ino nursed Dionysus; a temple of Asclepius and another of Achilles, and a small promontory upon which stood four brazen figures not more than a foot in height.

== Modern location ==
It is located near Paralio Leonidi.
