= Cyparissia (Laconia) =

Coordinates: 36°41′25″N 22°48′53″E

Cyparissia or Kyparissia (Ancient Greek: Κυπαρισσία) was a town of ancient Laconia, possessing a temple of Athena Cyparissia. Some authors claimed that Asopus was the later name of Cyparissia, but Strabo speaks of Cyparissia and Asopus as two separate places.

Its site is located near the modern Boza.
