= Giorgos Lafkas =

Greek songwriter, singer, and bouzouki player

Giorgos Lafkas Γιώργος Λαύκας
- Born: 9 August 1919
- Origin: Metamorfosi, Laconia, Greece
- Died: 26 December 1972 (aged 53) Athens, Greece
- Genres: Laïko, Rembetiko
- Occupations: Composer, songwriter, musician, singer
- Instrument: Bouzouki

Giorgos Lafkas (Greek: Γιώργος Λαύκας, 1919–1972) (or Giorgos Lavkas) was a Greek songwriter, singer, and bouzouki player.

== Biography ==
Lafkas was born in Metamorfosi, Laconia, in 1919, although some sources mention 1924 as the date of his birth. He came to Athens in 1943 to study agronomy, but he was won by music. According to Tassos Schorelis, the first club where he worked was the Ypovrychio (Deligiorgi Street 47) and there he wrote his first song, Seviliana, which was recorded in 1945.

During the German Occupation, according to G. Manisalis, he worked at Phoinikes, the subsequent Bouzouki (corner Solonos and Mavromichali streets). In 1961, he played with the orchestra in Komparsita. In 1963, he sang with Pr. Tsaousakis at Center Street Vouliagmeni. In 1968, he played with the orchestra in "Joy of Kessariani", etc.

Until his death, he participated in various bands and composed songs (many in lyrics of S. Tsiliverdis).
