= Agios Vasileios, Laconia =

Archaeological site in Greece

Agios Vasileios
- Άγιος Βασίλειος (Greek)
- Location within Greece
- 36°58′45″N 22°28′42″E
- Type: Settlement
- Periods: Bronze Age
- Cultures: Mycenaean Greece
- Location: Laconia, Greece

History
- Built: 17th-16th BC
- Abandoned: 14th-13th BC

Site notes
- Excavation dates: 2009, 2012
- Archaeologists: Adamantia Vasilogamvrou
- Condition: Partly buried

Agios Vasileios (also spelled Ayios Vasileios or Ayios Vasilios; Greek: Άγιος Βασίλειος) is the site of a Mycenaean palace, located 4 kilometers east of the village of Xirokambi in Laconia, Greece. It was west of the Eurotas River commanding the plain, some 10 km south of Sparta. The site is cut by the modern Sparta--Gytheio national road. It is named after a chapel by the side of the road.

== History ==
Ayios Vasileios was lightly inhabited during the Early Helladic I–II period (c. 3200-2200 BC) then abandoned for a time. It was re-occupied in the Middle Helladic III period (c. 1700–1550 BC), again lightly. The site grew in the Late Helladic period (c. 1550–1050 BC) reaching a maximum size of about 20 hectares before facing destruction and abandonment. There was minor occupations in the Classical, Hellenistic and Medieval and later periods.

=== Middle Bronze Age ===
In the Middle Helladic period, the site was re-occupied toward the later phase MH III (c. 1700-1550 BCE).

=== Late Bronze Age ===
This palace was first constructed in the LH IIIA period (1400–1300 BC), destroyed by fire in the LH IIIB period (c. 1300–1200 BC), partially rebuilt, and finally destroyed again not long afterward. Finds include an archive of Linear B tablets, kept in a room adjacent to the colonnade; cult objects such as figurines made of clay and ivory; a collection of twenty bronze swords; and fragments of wall frescoes.

==== Late Helladic II ====
The first palace was built and later destroyed.

==== Late Helladic III ====
The second palace was rebuilt in LH III. Ceramics dates throughout LH IIIA-C. There is litte material from LH IIIA1. In LH IIIA2 (early) has material represented in several areas of the palace. The buildings around the large court were destroyed by fire at the end of LH IIIB. In LHIIIB2 scattered rebuilding and abandoned in late LH IIIB2 or early LH IIIC.

== Excavations ==
The site rises 200 meters above the plain and a stream flows down the north side of it into the Eurotas river. It was first examined during an archaeological survey in the 1950s which reported wall remains and numerous pottery sherds including a few from the Early Helladic (EH) period. Another survey in the early 1990s found numerous EH sherds mainly 50 to l00 meters south and south-east of the modern chapel.

After a Linear B tablet was found accidentally on the slope of a hill, near the Byzantine chapel of Agios Vasileios (St. Basil), in 2008; two more tablet fragments were found in a survey conducted the same year. One tablet involved a large number of daggers (or short swords) "e-pi-zo-ta" and the third tablet referred to textiles, woven fabric. Excavations, carried out by the Archaeological Society of Athens and directed by archaeologist Adamantia Vasilogamvrou, began in 2009. Small finds included a number of bronze swords, pottery, figurines, and fresco fragments. In the 2012 season more linear B tablets, a small Egyptian figurine and a large number of fresco fragments, primarily near Building B and in a collapsed chamber tomb in the adjacent cemetery used as a dump, from the Late Helladic IIIA period were found. By the 2015 annual season the known site area had grown to 3.5 hectares with three building (Building A, Building B, Building C) and a cemetery having been excavated and finds included a bulls head rhyton. In a courtyard of Building A a possible cultic area, dated to LH III B2-C period, was found with hearths, a feasting deposit, and an altar. The altar was oriented northeast to southwest featuring horns of consecration and with a number of large, wheelmade bovid figures. Subsequent seasons have brought to light a palace complex with a large central courtyard with colonnaded porticos along the sides. More Linear B inscriptions were found in subsequent excavations.

== See also ==
- Helladic chronology
- Menelaion
