= Myrsini, Laconia =

Myrsini Μυρσίνη
- Community
- Location within Greece
- Coordinates: 36°44′56″N 22°26′56″E
- Country: Greece
- Administrative region: Peloponnese
- Regional unit: Laconia
- Municipality: East Mani
- Municipal unit: Gytheio

Population (2021)
  - Community: 110
- Time zone: UTC+2 (EET)
  - Summer (DST): UTC+3 (EEST)

Myrsini (Greek: Μυρσίνη) is a village and a community in the municipality East Mani, Laconia, southern Greece. The community consists of the villages Myrsini and Profitis Ilias (before 1955: Τόμπρα - Tompra). The villages lie on the southern slopes of the Taygetus mountain range, in the Mani Peninsula at an altitude of 400–500 m (1,300–1,600 ft) near the town of Gytheio.
