= Drosopigi, Laconia =

Drosopigi Δροσοπηγή
- Community
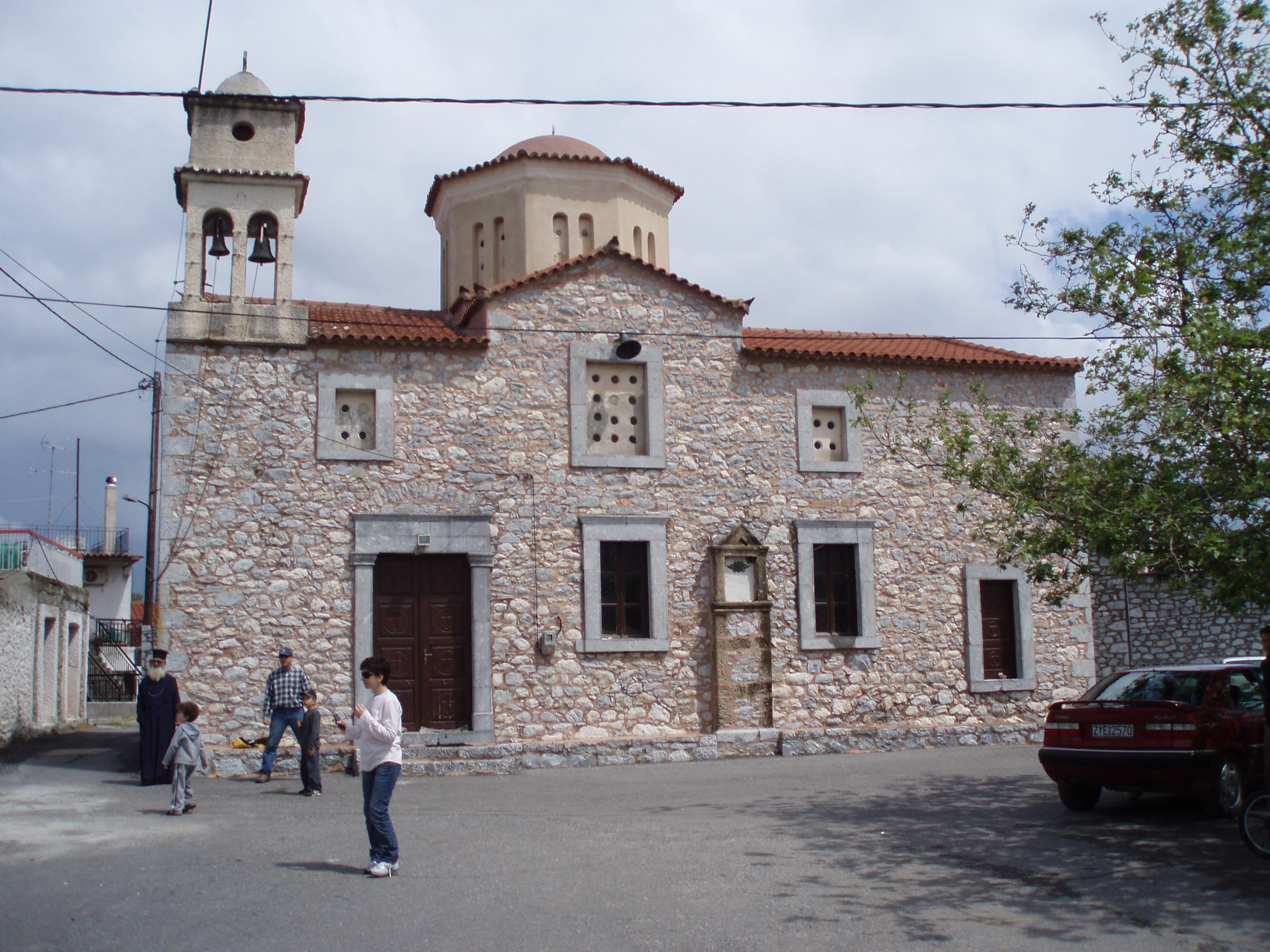
- The church of Agios Nikolaos

- Location within Greece
- Coordinates: 36°40.3′N 22°27.7′E
- Country: Greece
- Administrative region: Peloponnese
- Regional unit: Laconia
- Municipality: East Mani
- Municipal unit: Gytheio

Population (2021)
  - Community: 66
- Time zone: UTC+2 (EET)
  - Summer (DST): UTC+3 (EEST)

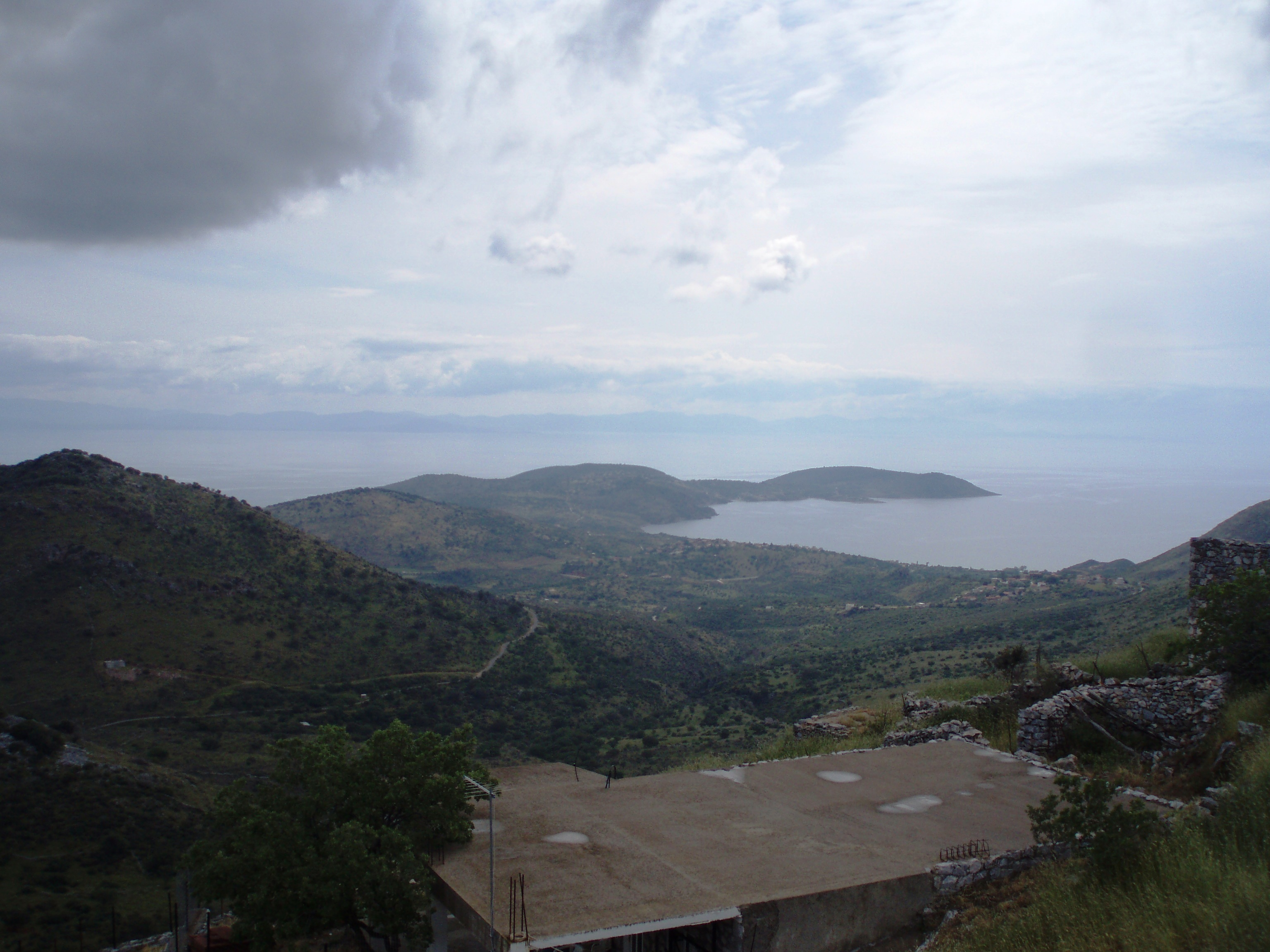
View of Mani Peninsula.

Drosopigi (Greek: Δροσοπηγή) or "Tserova" (Greek: Τσεροβά) is a small village in the Peloponnese of southern Greece. It is on the Mani Peninsula in the administrative region of Laconia. It is part of the municipality of East Mani near the city of Gytheio. Drosopigi lies on a mountain around 400 m (1,300 ft) above sea level. Like many of their fellow Maniots, the inhabitants of Drosopigi built distinctive towers and tower houses.

Drosopigi has a permanent population of around 50. Known for its beaches, it is a tourist destination in the summer.

== Historical population ==
Year	Population
1981	104
1991	102
2001	80
2011	57
2021	66

== See also ==
- List of settlements in Laconia
