= Faraklo, Laconia =

Village in Greece

Coordinates: 36°32′N 23°05′E

Faraklo is a village in the municipality of Monemvasia, Laconia, Greece. It has a population of 96, and an elevation of approximately 400 metres. It has strong ties with the city of Neapolis. Snow is infrequent, but does occur.
