= Vordonia =

Vordonia Βορδόνια
- Community
- Location within Greece
- Coordinates: 37°8.6′N 22°20.1′E
- Country: Greece
- Administrative region: Peloponnese
- Regional unit: Laconia
- Municipality: Sparta
- Municipal unit: Pellana
- Elevation: 447 m (1,467 ft)

Population (2021)
  - Community: 185
- Time zone: UTC+2 (EET)
  - Summer (DST): UTC+3 (EEST)
- Postal code: 230 59
- Area code: 27310

Vordonia (Greek: Βορδόνια) is a small village in the base of Taygetos mountain, in Laconia, Greece. The village is divided into three communities (Kampos, Kato Hora and Pano Hora) and is part of the municipality of Sparti.

The name Vordonia is believed to harken back to the Villehardouin family, the first ruling dynasty of the Principality of Achaea after the Fourth Crusade (1204). William II Villehardouin located his capital at the town of Mystras, some 10 km SW of Vordonia. The Crusader castle located above the village lends credibility to this hypothesis.

== Historical population ==
Year	Population
1981	474
1991	115
2001	393
2011	295
2021	185

== See also ==
- List of settlements in Laconia
