= Vasaras =

Human settlement in Greece

Vasaras Βασαράς
- Community
- Location within Greece
- Coordinates: 37°10′N 22°30′E
- Country: Greece
- Administrative region: Peloponnese
- Regional unit: Laconia
- Municipality: Sparta
- Municipal unit: Oinountas

Population (2021)
  - Community: 144
- Time zone: UTC+2 (EET)
  - Summer (DST): UTC+3 (EEST)

Vasaras (Greek: Βασαράς) is a village in Laconia, Greece. It is part of the municipality Sparti, municipal unit Oinountas.
