= Agioi Anargyroi, Laconia =

Village in Laconia, Greece

Agioi Anargyroi Αγίων Αναργύρων
- Settlement
- Location within Greece
- Coordinates: 37°01′30″N 22°37′19″E
- Country: Greece
- Administrative region: Peloponnese
- Regional unit: Laconia
- Municipality: Sparta
- Elevation: 320 m (1,050 ft)
- Time zone: UTC+2 (EET)
  - Summer (DST): UTC+3 (EEST)

Agioi Anargyroi (Greek: Άγιοι Ανάργυροι, Αγίων Αναργύρων, or Αγίους Αναργύρους), also known as Agii Anargiri and previously known as Zoupena, is a village in the foothills of the Parnon mountain range of Laconia, Greece in the province of Lakedaimon. The village is located with the Sparta municipality according the Kallikratis Programme. Its elevation is at 320m (1,050ft). It is accessible along the Epar.Od. Spartis-Agiou Dimitriou road.

== History ==
Agioi Anargyroi and neighboring villages, such as Gkoritsa, were formed by a migration of the Tsintzinians into the Lakonia Plains beginning in the late 1700s. The Tsintzinians were from the settlement of Tsintzina. Tsintzinians acquired Agioi Anargyroi's Ottoman-occupied farmland after Greece gained domestic sovereignty as a result of the Greek War of Independence (1821–1829). According to Nikos L. Andritsakis's collection of accounts (many published in the Ta Tsintzina newspaper), wealthy and esteemed families obtained a large portion of the fertile and desirable land while poorer families acquired inferior land. Agioi Anargyroi's predated the establishment of Gkoritsa by 50 years. Both villages grew mostly as a result of olive production and pressing in the 1900s.

On March 21th of 1835, the village was annexed in the municipality of Therapnes. In July 8th of 1899, the village was transferred from the prefecture of Laconia to Lakedaemon. This was reversed on December 4th of 1909. Then in August 31th of 1912, the village was detached from Therapnes and was established as the seat of the community of Zoupena.

On June 5th of 1944, during the Feast of the Holy Spirit, Nazi occupation troops passed through Agioi Anargyroi (then named Zoupena) coming back from liquidations operation in region. While leaving the village, one of the Nazi soldiers was shot and injured. Afterwards, they created fire and killed villagers. The Γεωργίου Αθ. Κωστιάνη (English: Georgiou Ath. Kostiani)'s testimony reports there was 22 victims buried in a mass grave. ΑΡΧΕΙΟΝ ΠΟΛΙΤΙΣΜΟΥ (English: Culture Archive) claims there is an "unverified number of victims, others say 24 others 27." The names of 21 victims have been identified.

Originally called Zoupena (Ζούπενα) or Zoupainia (Ζούπαινα), it was renamed from Zoupena to Agioi Anargyroi on September 20, 1955. The local community was also renamed as the community of Agioi Anargyroi. The name change was a part of a broader movement in Greece to replace place names (see Geographical name changes in Greece) with ones that reflected Greek identity.

As a part of the Kapodistrias reform on December 4th of 1997, the community was abolished and the village annexed with the Therapnes municipality. Further, as a part of the Kallikratis Programme passed on June 7th of 2010, the village was annexed under the municipality of Sparta.

== Wildfires ==
In late August to early September 2007, fire spread across the Tsintzina region. In Agioi Anargyroi, the fire damaged 4201 acres (1700 ha) of grazing fields, 741 acres (300 ha) of olive grove, (Note: Source reports area damaged in square meters. Values are conversions of square meters to acres and hectares rounded to nearest whole number.) 180 beehives, 15 stables, 10 storage houses, and 4 houses. Agioi Anargyroi lost 54% of its olive grove area to the fire. The damage inflicted by this wildfire is attributed to strong winds, inadequate aerial support early on, and an insufficient fire brigade.

== Demographics ==
Agioi Anargyroi's population has been declined since at least 1981.

Historic Population
Year	Population
1981	515
1991	510
2001	468
2011	355
2021	313

== Points of interest ==
The oldest monastery in Laconia, Cemetery (Νεκροταφείο), Barbecue restaurant (Ταβέρνα Μάζης Σαράντος), Mechanic Workshop (Μηχανουργείο Μπενέκος), Plaza/Park (Πλατεια), Church of Saint Demetrius of Thessalonica (Άγιος Δημήτριος), Church of Saint Nicholas Church (Ιερός Ναός Αγίου Νικολάου), and Athletic Field (Γήπεδο Αγίων Αναργύρων).
