= Ierakas =

Ierakas Ιέρακας
- Community
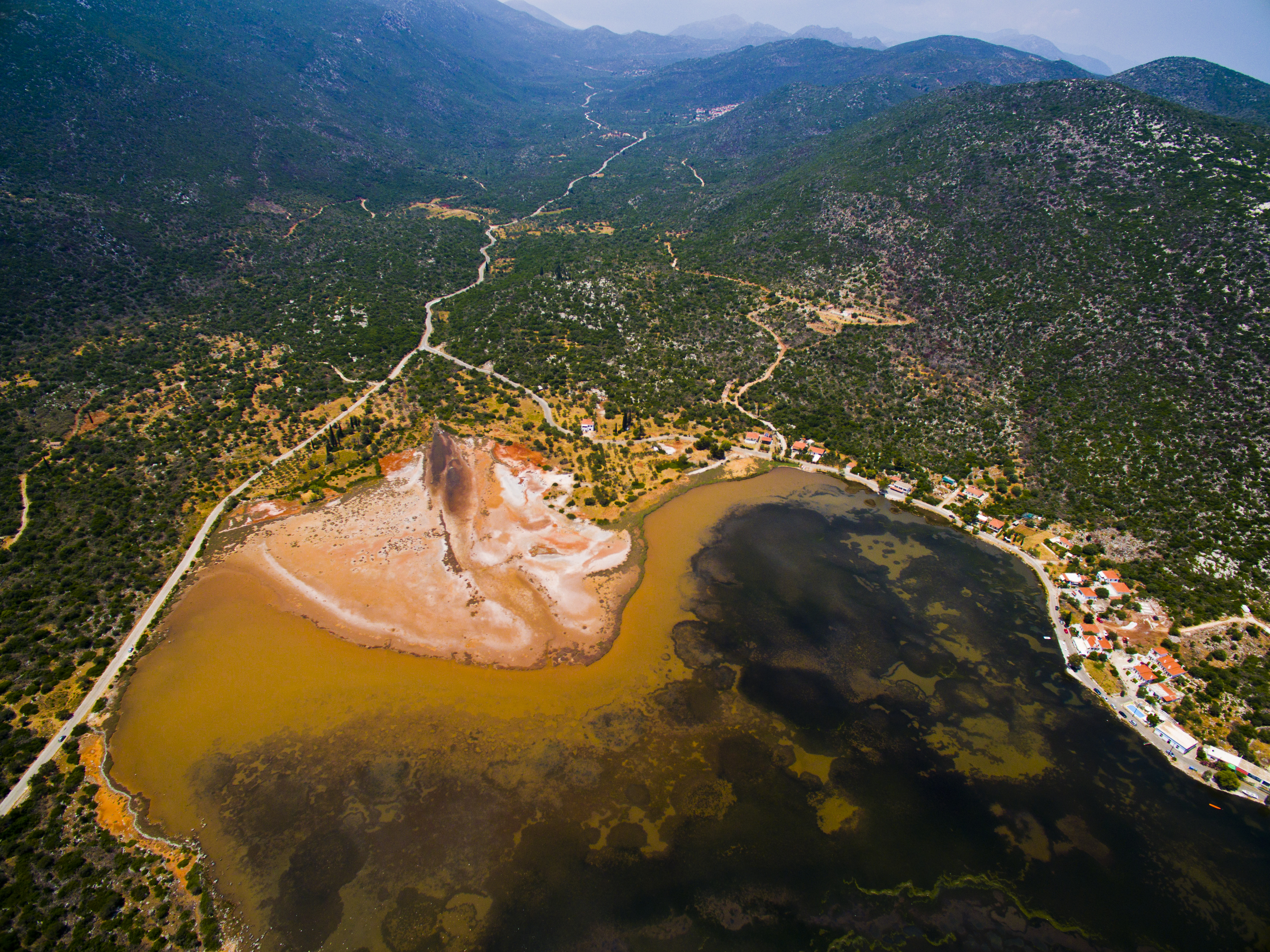

- Location within Greece
- Coordinates: 36°48′20″N 23°03′24″E
- Country: Greece
- Administrative region: Peloponnese
- Regional unit: Laconia
- Municipality: Monemvasia
- Municipal unit: Zarakas

Population (2021)
  - Community: 129
- Time zone: UTC+2 (EET)
  - Summer (DST): UTC+3 (EEST)
- Vehicle registration: AK

Ierakas (Greek: Ιέρακας) is a small village built along a natural fjord on the south east coast of Laconia, Greece. It is part of the municipal unit of Zarakas. Ierakas is famous for its port or limani (Greek: Λιμάνι), providing docks for yachts and boats. The port village includes a hotel, restaurants, taverns and cafés, popular for their fresh fish and seafood throughout the year. The limani is also the location of the ruins of the ancient town of Zarax.
