= Kyparissi, Laconia =

Kyparissi Κυπαρίσσι
- Community
- Location within Greece
- Coordinates: 36°58′N 22°59′E
- Country: Greece
- Administrative region: Peloponnese
- Regional unit: Laconia
- Municipality: Monemvasia
- Municipal unit: Zarakas

Population (2021)
  - Community: 402
- Time zone: UTC+2 (EET)
  - Summer (DST): UTC+3 (EEST)
- Vehicle registration: AK

Kyparissi (Greek: Κυπαρίσσι) is a small village along the north east coast of Laconia, Greece. It is part of the municipal unit of Zarakas. In recent years it has become famous as a rock climbing destination.
