= Xirokambi =

Village outside Sparta, Greece

Xirokambi Ξηροκάμπι
- Community
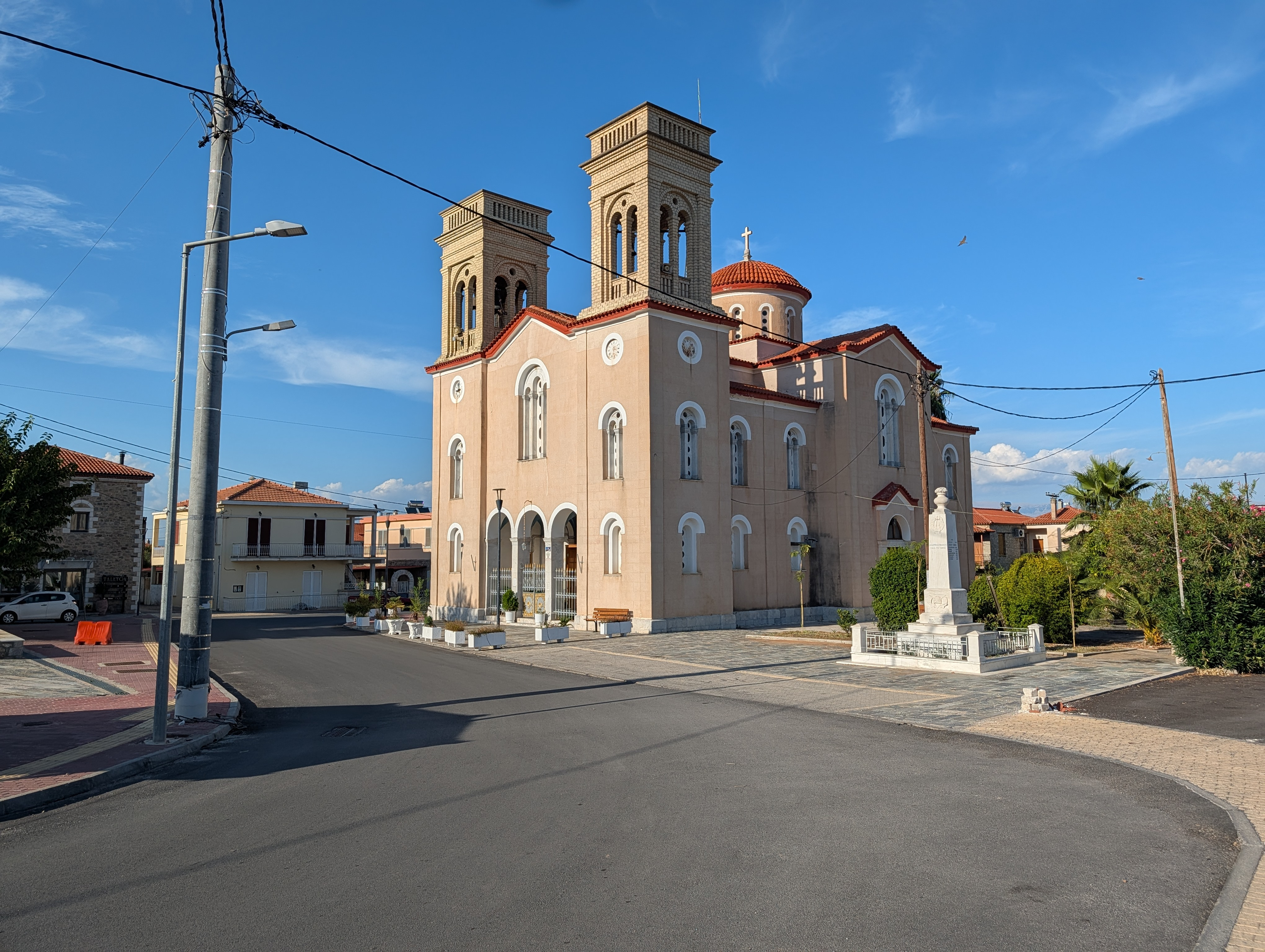
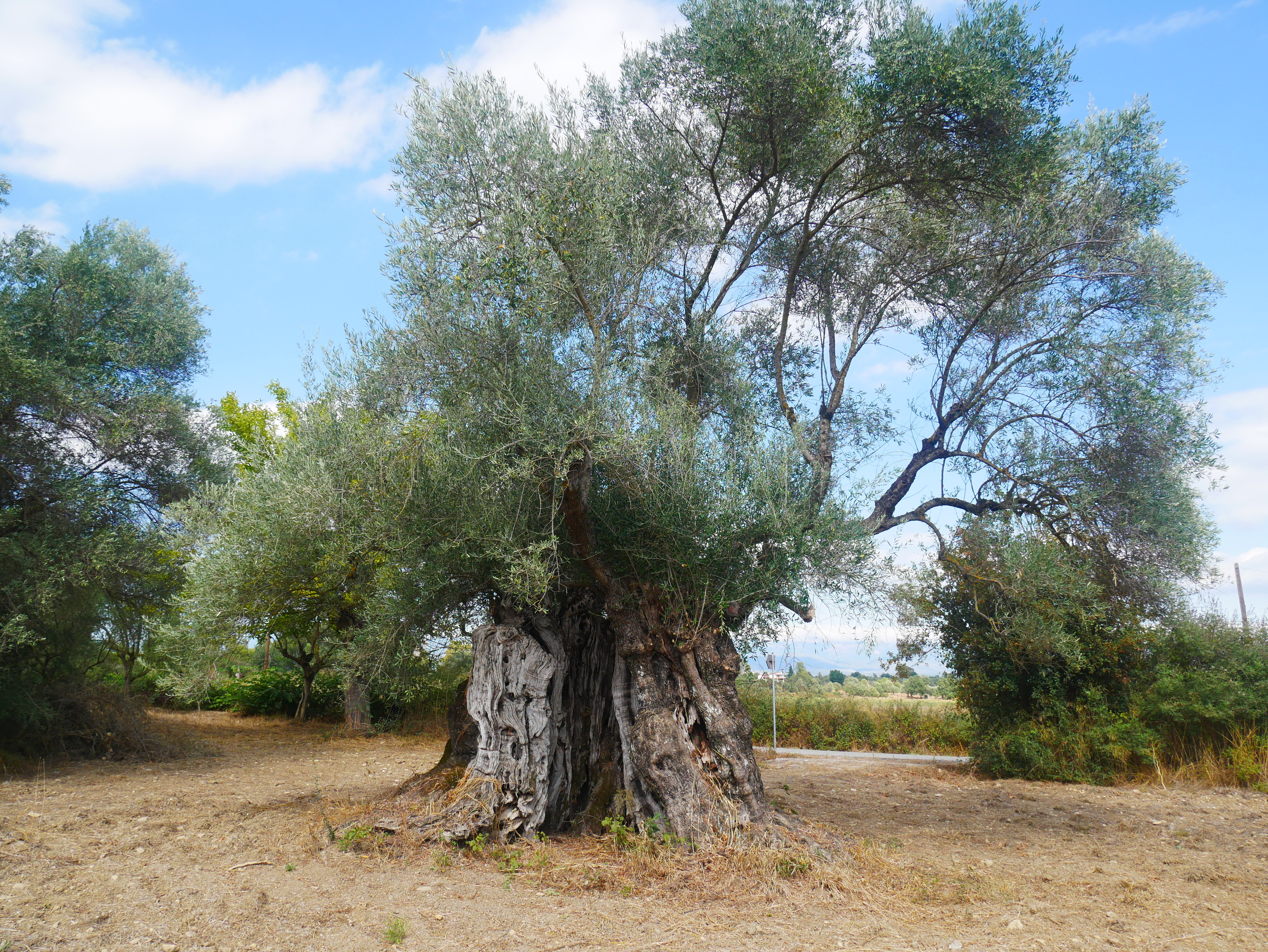
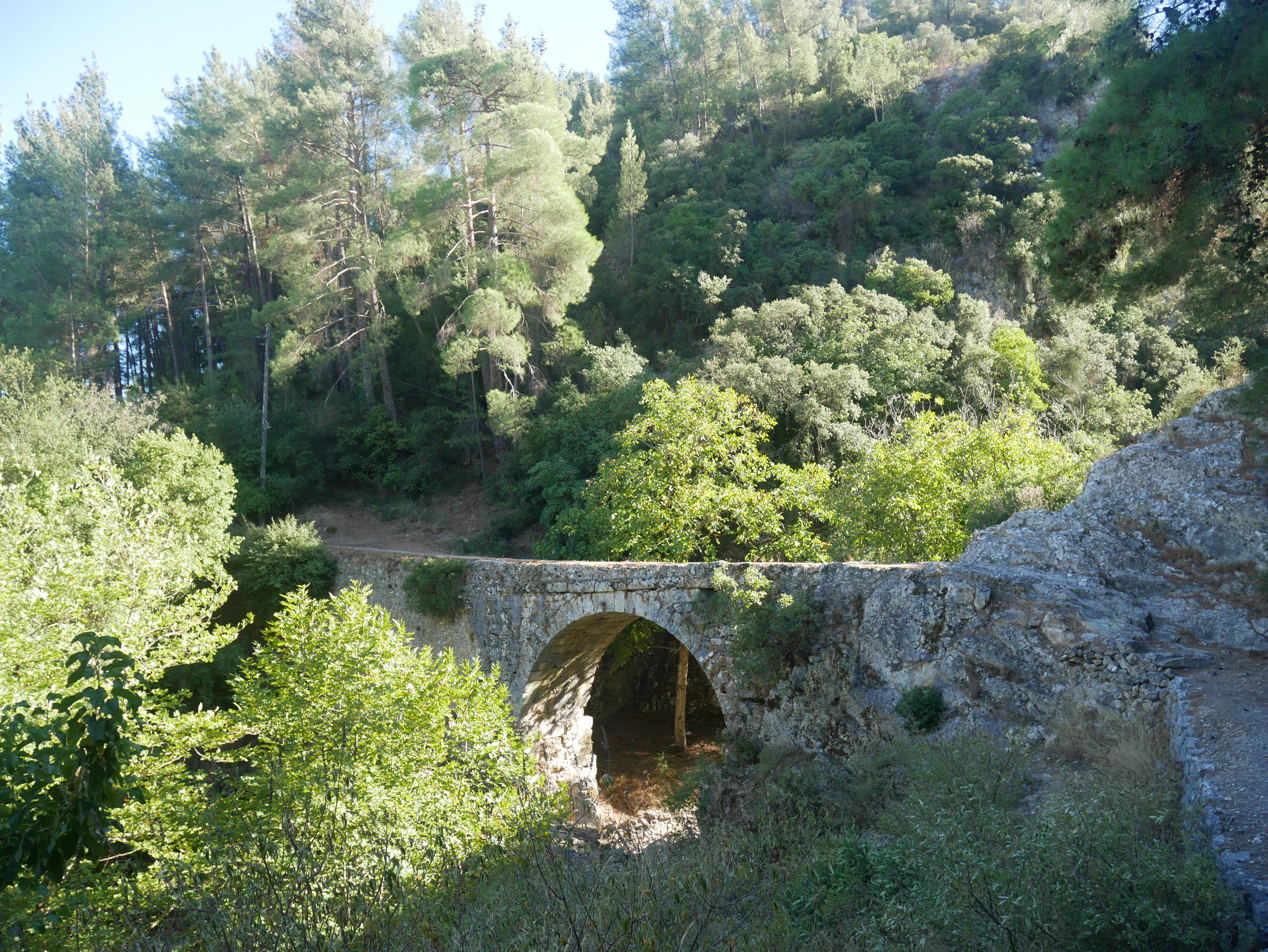
- Clockwise from top right: Holy Trinity Orthodox Church (Agia Triada) next to village plateia, Olive tree said to be 1,000 years old, Stone arch bridge towards Koumousta said to be the oldest functional bridge in Europe (built 1st century AD)

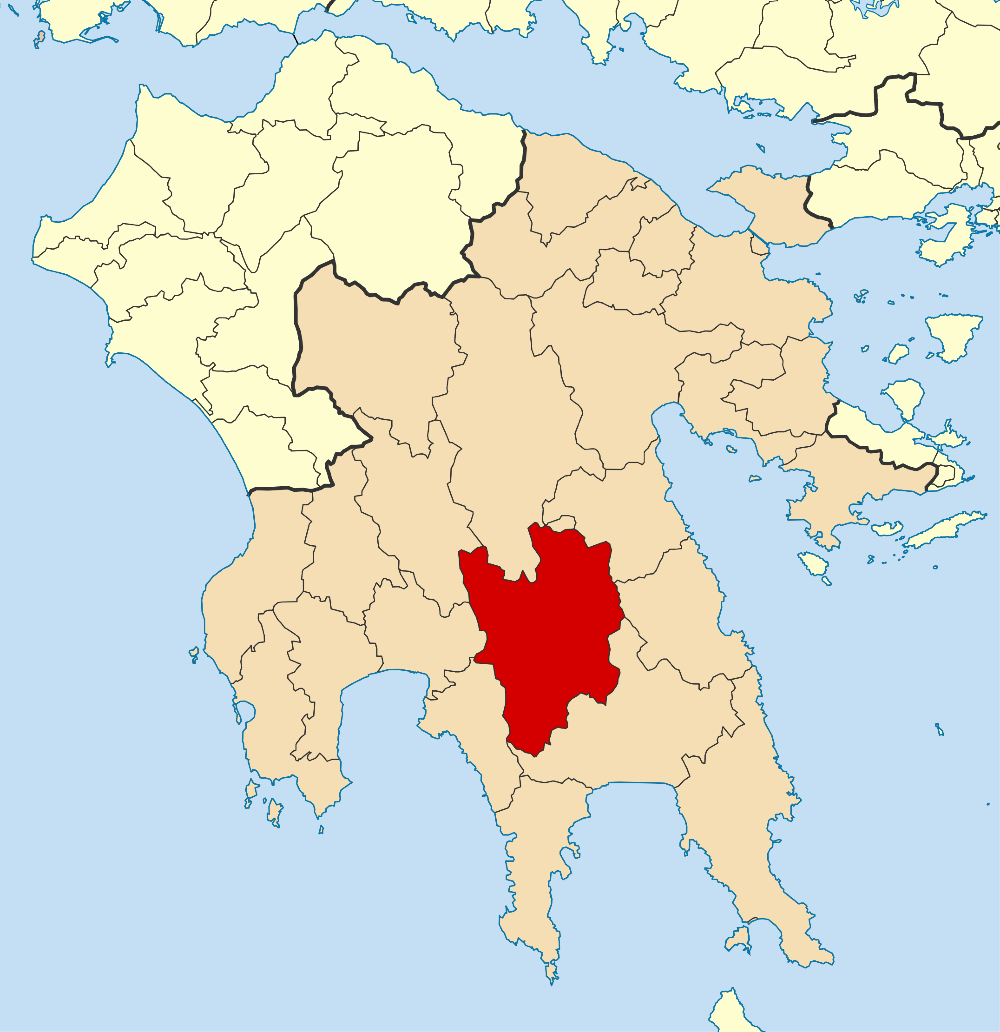

- Location within Greece
- Coordinates: 36°57′34″N 22°27′8″E
- Country: Greece
- Administrative region: Peloponnese
- Regional unit: Laconia
- Municipality: Sparta
- Municipal unit: Sparta
- Elevation: 242 m (794 ft)

Population (2021)
  - Community: 868
- Time zone: UTC+2 (EET)
  - Summer (DST): UTC+3 (EEST)
- Postal code: 230 54

Xirokambi (Greek: Ξηροκάμπι, also transliterated as Xirokampi or Xirocambi) is a village and a community near Sparta in the regional unit of Laconia, Greece. Located in the southern Peloponnese, records show that the modern community has existed since at least 1758.

During the Ottoman rule of Greece, most residents lived 6km further into the mountains in the nearby traditional settlement of Koumousta. After the conclusion of the Greek War of Independence, the inhabitants of Koumousta slowly returned to Xirokambi over the 19th and 20th centuries, revitalizing the village. On the path from Xirokambi to Koumousta is a bridge believed to have been constructed in the 1st century AD which, according to local legend, was used by Helen of Troy.

Like nearby Kalamata, famous for its Kalamata olives, olive trees are plentiful in the region surrounding Xirokambi due to its fertile soil and favorable weather conditions. The village contains one tree thought to be over 1,000 years old on the border of nearby Kidonitsa.

== Population ==
Year	Population
1951	1,139
1991	1,045
2001	1,004
2011	967
2021	868

== See also ==
- List of settlements in Laconia
