= Asopos =

Asopos Ασωπός
- Municipal unit
- Location within the regional unit

- Location within Greece
- Coordinates: 36°44′N 22°52′E
- Country: Greece
- Administrative region: Peloponnese
- Regional unit: Laconia
- Municipality: Monemvasia

Area
  - Municipal unit: 94.36 km^{2} (36.43 sq mi)

Population (2021)
  - Municipal unit: 4,164
  - Municipal unit density: 44.13/km^{2} (114.3/sq mi)
  - Community: 1,214
- Time zone: UTC+2 (EET)
  - Summer (DST): UTC+3 (EEST)
- Vehicle registration: AK

Asopos (Greek: Ασωπός; also Latinised as Asopus) is a village and a former municipality in Laconia, Peloponnese, Greece. Since the 2011 local government reform it is part of the municipality Monemvasia, of which it is a municipal unit. The municipal unit has an area of 94.360 km^{2}. Population 4,164 (2021). The seat of the municipality was in Papadianika.
