= Sykia, Laconia =

Sykia Συκιά
- Community
- Location within Greece
- Coordinates: 36°45′50″N 22°56′35″E
- Country: Greece
- Administrative region: Peloponnese
- Regional unit: Laconia
- Municipality: Monemvasia
- Municipal unit: Molaoi

Population (2021)
  - Community: 815
- Time zone: UTC+2 (EET)
  - Summer (DST): UTC+3 (EEST)
- Postal code: 230 52
- Vehicle registration: AK

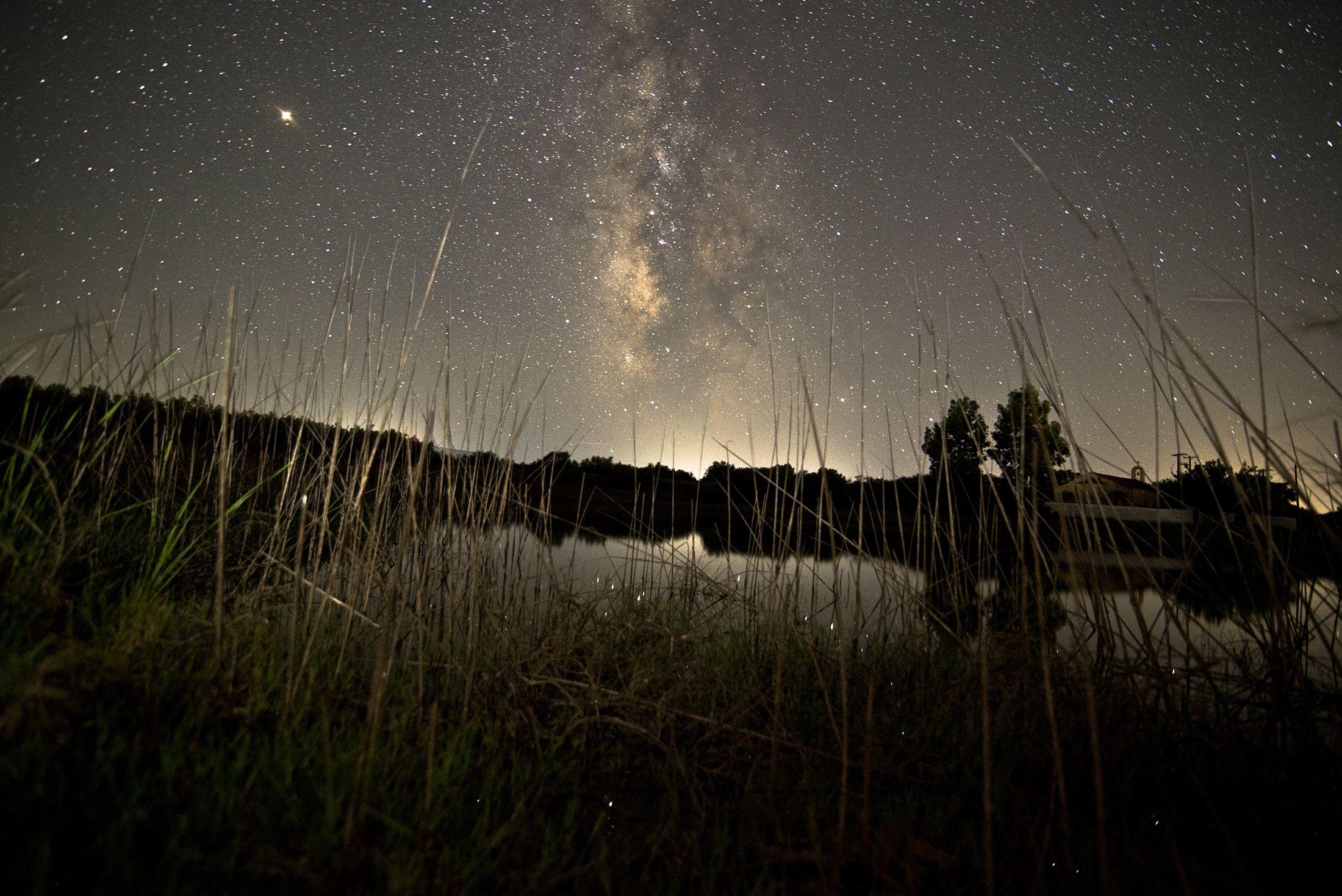
The pond ("loutsa") of Saint George near the village.

Sykia (Greek: Συκιά, also Συκέα - Sykea) is a village in Laconia, Greece, 9 km from the center of Molaoi town.
