= Greek War of Independence =

Greek rebellion against the Ottoman Empire (1821–1829)

- Part of the revolutions during the 1820s
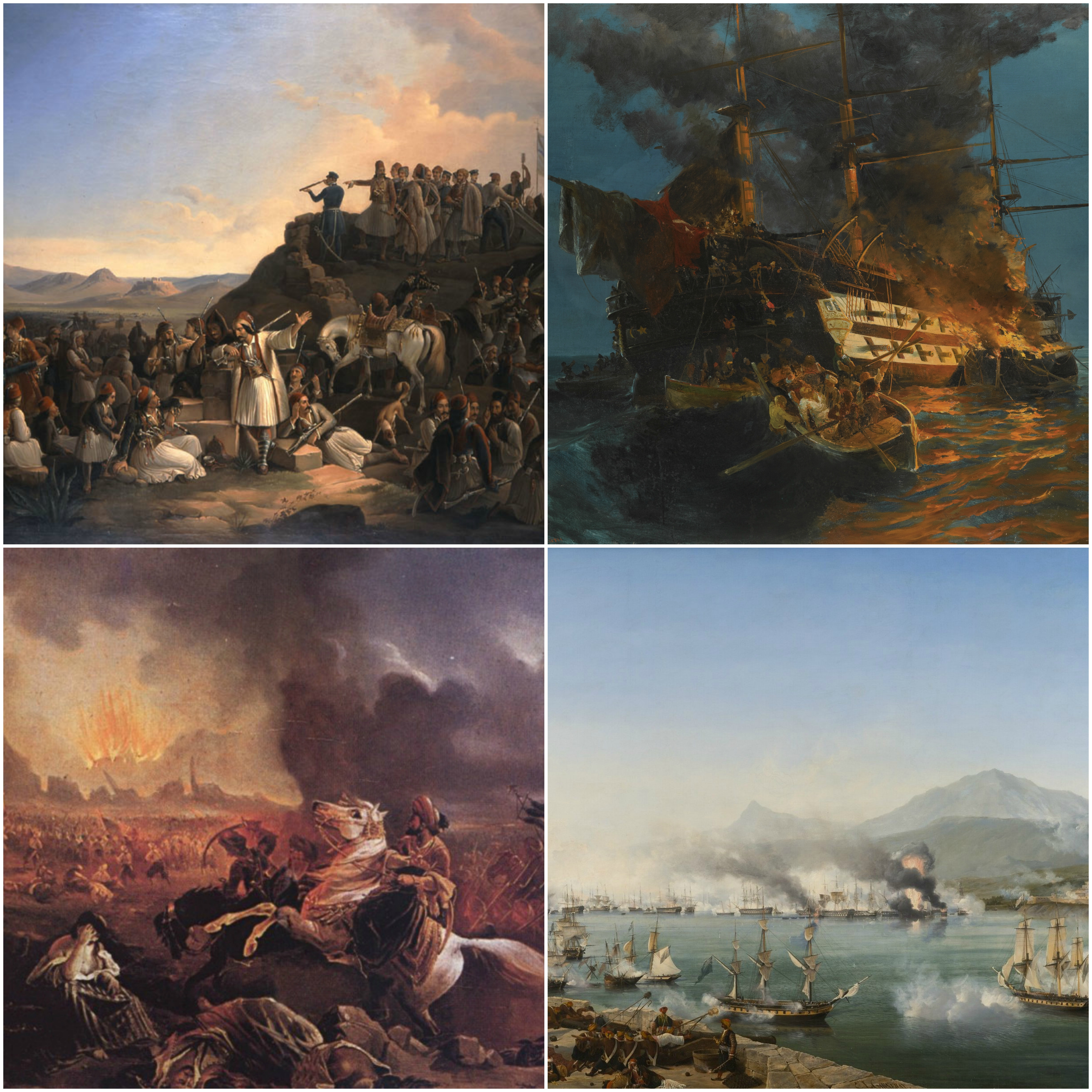
- Top left: The camp at Phaliro. Top right: The burning of the Ottoman flagship off Chios. Bottom right: The Battle of Navarino. Bottom left: Ibrahim Pasha of Egypt at the Third Siege of Missolonghi.
Date	21 February 1821 – 12 September 1829 (8 years, 6 months and 3 weeks)
Location	Ottoman Greece (present-day Greece)
Result	Greek victory (Note: London Protocol (1830), London Conference (1832), Treaty of Constantinople (1832))
Territorial changes	Independence of Greece: The Peloponnese, Saronic Islands, Cyclades, Sporades and Continental Greece ceded to the independent Greek state; Crete ceded to Egypt

Belligerents
Greek revolutionaries In detail: Klephts; Armatoloi; Filiki Eteria (Note: Only in 1821); Sacred Band; Messenian Senate; Peloponnesian Senate (Note: From 1821–1823.); Senate of Western Continental Greece; Areopagus of Eastern Continental Greece; Temporary regime of Crete; Military-Political System of Samos; After 1822: First Hellenic Republic; Military support: (First Hellenic Republic) Philhellenes; Carbonari revolutionaries; Serbian revolutionaries; Moldavian revolutionaries (Note: From 1821.); Russian Empire (Note: From 1826.); Kingdom of France; United Kingdom; Diplomatic support: Haiti (Note: Haiti was the first nation to recognize the independence of Greece.); United States	Ottoman Empire Supported by: Egypt; Regency of Algiers; Tripolitania; Tunis; Danubian Sich

Commanders and leaders
(Sacred Band (1821)) Alexander Ypsilantis #; (First Hellenic Republic) Demetrios Ypsilantis; (First Hellenic Republic) Ioannis Kapodistrias; (First Hellenic Republic) Theodoros Kolokotronis; (First Hellenic Republic) Alexandros Mavrokordatos; (First Hellenic Republic) Andreas Zaimis; (First Hellenic Republic) Germanos III #; (First Hellenic Republic) Petros Mavromichalis; (First Hellenic Republic) Georgios Karaiskakis †; (First Hellenic Republic) Athanasios Diakos (executed); (First Hellenic Republic) Grigorios Papaflessas †; (First Hellenic Republic) Andreas Metaxas; (First Hellenic Republic) Markos Botsaris †; (First Hellenic Republic) Yannis Makriyannis; (First Hellenic Republic) Nikitas Stamatelopoulos; (First Hellenic Republic) Emmanouel Pappas #; (First Hellenic Republic) Anastasios Karatasos; (First Hellenic Republic) Odysseas Androutsos (executed); (First Hellenic Republic) Andreas Miaoulis; (First Hellenic Republic) Konstantinos Kanaris; (First Hellenic Republic) Laskarina Bouboulina †; (First Hellenic Republic) Manto Mavrogenous; Philhellenes: (First Hellenic Republic) Lord Byron #; (First Hellenic Republic) Charles Nicolas Fabvier; (First Hellenic Republic) Richard Church; European support: (Russian Empire) Nicholas I; (Russian Empire) Lodewijk Heiden; (Kingdom of France) Henri de Rigny; (Kingdom of France) Nicolas Maison; (United Kingdom of Great Britain and Ireland) Edward Codrington	(Ottoman Empire) Mahmud II; (Ottoman Empire) Nasuhzade Ali Pasha †; (Ottoman Empire) Omer Vrioni; (Ottoman Empire) Mahmud Dramali Pasha #; (Ottoman Empire) Kara Mehmed; (Ottoman Empire) Hursid Pasha †; (Ottoman Empire) Koca Hüsrev Mehmed Pasha; (Ottoman Empire) Mustafa Pasha Bushatli; (Ottoman Empire) Reşid Mehmed Pasha; (Ottoman Empire) Mehmed Selim Pasha; Egyptian support: (Ottoman Egypt) Muhammad Ali Pasha; (Ottoman Egypt) Ibrahim Pasha; (Ottoman Egypt) Ismael Gibraltar †; Algerian support: (Regency of Algiers) Hussein Dey

Strength
66,000–67,000 Greek revolutionaries (Note: Not including c. 1,200 Philhellenic volunteers; 940 of which are documented.); 51,000 land; 15,000–16,000 naval	(Ottoman Empire) 415,000 Ottoman soldiers (Note: 220,000 infantry, 180,000 cavalry, 15,000 artillery.); 135,000 Janissaries; 40,000 Albanians; 27,000–42,000 men of Muhammad Ali Pasha (Note: Muhammad Ali Pasha's army was mainly composed of enslaved Sudanese soldiers, but also had large numbers of Egyptians (fellahin), Turks, Syrians, Albanians and Moroccans. They were infamous for their brutality against Greek civilians.)

Casualties and losses
15,000 Greek revolutionaries (Note: Not including c. 400 Philhellenic volunteers; 313 of which are documented.)	(Ottoman Empire) 44,000–50,000 Ottoman soldiers
- 230,000–600,000 Greek civilians 15,000–25,000 Muslim civilians

The Greek War of Independence, (Note: Greek: Ελληνική Επανάσταση, Elliniki Epanastasi; referred to by Greeks in the 19th century as simply the Αγώνας, Agonas, "Struggle"; Ottoman Turkish: يونان عصيانى, Yunan İsyanı, "Greek Rebellion") also known as the Greek Revolution or the Greek Revolution of 1821, was a successful war of independence fought by Greek revolutionaries against the Ottoman Empire from 1821 to 1829. In 1826, the Greeks were assisted by the British Empire, the Kingdom of France, and the Russian Empire, while the Ottomans were aided by their vassals, especially by the Eyalet of Egypt. The war led to the formation of modern Greece, which in subsequent years would be expanded to its current size. The revolution is commemorated by Greeks in Greece and the Greek diaspora on 25 March, as Independence Day.

All Greek territory, except the Ionian Islands, came under Ottoman rule in the 15th century, in the decades surrounding the Fall of Constantinople. During the following centuries, there were sporadic but unsuccessful Greek uprisings against Ottoman rule. In 1814, a secret organization called the Filiki Eteria (Society of Friends) was founded by Nikolaos Skoufas, Emmanuil Xanthos, and Athanasios Tsakalov with the aim of liberating Greece. It planned to launch revolts in the Peloponnese, the Danubian Principalities, and Constantinople. The insurrection was planned for 25 March 1821, the Orthodox Christian Feast of the Annunciation. However, the plans were discovered by the Ottoman authorities, forcing it to start earlier.

The first revolt began on 21 February 1821 in the Danubian Principalities, but it was soon put down by the Ottomans. These events urged Greeks in the Peloponnese into action and on 17 March 1821, the Maniots were first to declare war. In September 1821, the Greeks, under the leadership of Theodoros Kolokotronis, captured Tripolitsa. Revolts in Crete, Macedonia, and Central Greece broke out, but were suppressed. Greek fleets achieved success against the Ottoman navy in the Aegean Sea and prevented Ottoman reinforcements from arriving by sea. Tensions developed among Greek factions, leading to two consecutive civil wars. The Ottoman Sultan called in Muhammad Ali of Egypt, who agreed to send his son, Ibrahim Pasha, to Greece with an army to suppress the revolt in return for territorial gains. Ibrahim landed in the Peloponnese in February 1825 and brought most of the peninsula under Egyptian control by the end of that year. Though an Ottoman–Egyptian invasion of Mani failed, Athens fell, and revolutionary morale decreased.

The three great powers—Russia, Britain, and France—decided to intervene, sending their naval squadrons to Greece in 1827. They destroyed the Ottoman–Egyptian fleet at the Battle of Navarino, and turned the tide in favor of the revolutionaries. In 1828, the Egyptian army withdrew under pressure from a French expeditionary force. The Ottoman garrisons in the Peloponnese surrendered and the Greek revolutionaries retook central Greece. The Ottoman Empire declared war on Russia allowing for the Russian army to move into the Balkans. This forced the Ottomans to accept Greek autonomy in the Treaty of Adrianople and semi-autonomy for Serbia and the Romanian principalities. After nine years of war, Greece was recognized as an independent state under the London Protocol of February 1830. Further negotiations in 1832 led to the London Conference and the Treaty of Constantinople, which defined the final borders of the new state and established Prince Otto of Bavaria as the first king of Greece.

The slogan of the revolution, Eleftheria i thanatos 'Freedom or death', became Greece's national motto.

== Background ==
=== Ottoman rule over Greece ===
The Fall of Constantinople on 29 May 1453 and the subsequent fall of the successor states of the Byzantine Empire marked the end of Byzantine sovereignty. After that, the Ottoman Empire ruled the Balkans and Anatolia (Asia Minor), with some exceptions. (Note: Adanir refers to the "mountainous districts such as Mani in the Peloponnese or Souli and Himara in Epirus, which had never been completely subjugated".) Orthodox Christians were granted some political rights under Ottoman rule, but they were considered inferior subjects. The majority of Greeks were called Rayah by the Turks, a name that referred to the large mass of non-Muslim subjects under the Ottoman ruling class. (Note: Re'âyâ. An Arabic word meaning "flock" or "herd animal".)

Meanwhile, Greek intellectuals and humanists, who had migrated west before or during the Ottoman invasions, such as Demetrios Chalkokondyles and Leonardos Philaras, began to call for the liberation of their homeland. Demetrius Chalcondyles called on Venice and "all of the Latins" to aid the Greeks against "the abominable, monstrous, and impious barbarian Turks". However, Greece was to remain under Ottoman rule for several more centuries.

The Greek Revolution was not an isolated event; numerous failed attempts at regaining independence took place throughout the Ottoman era. Throughout the 17th century, there was great resistance to the Ottomans in the Morea and elsewhere, as evidenced by revolts led by Dionysius the Philosopher. After the Morean War, the Peloponnese came under Venetian rule for 30 years, and remained in turmoil from then on and throughout the 17th century, as bands of klephts multiplied.

The first great uprising was the Russian-sponsored Orlov Revolt of the 1770s, which was crushed by the Ottomans after having limited success. After the suppression of the uprising, Muslim Albanians ravaged many regions of mainland Greece. However, the Maniots continually resisted Ottoman rule and defeated several Ottoman incursions into their region, the most famous of which was the invasion of 1770. During the Second Russo-Turkish War, the Greek community of Trieste financed a small fleet under Lambros Katsonis, which was a nuisance for the Ottoman navy; during the war klephts and armatoloi (guerilla fighters in mountainous areas) rose once again.

At the same time, a number of Greeks enjoyed a privileged position in the Ottoman state as members of the Ottoman bureaucracy. Greeks controlled the affairs of the Orthodox Church through the Ecumenical Patriarchate of Constantinople, as the higher clergy of the Orthodox Church was mostly of Greek origin. Thus, as a result of the Ottoman millet system, the predominantly Greek hierarchy of the Patriarchate enjoyed control over the Empire's Orthodox subjects, the Rum milleti.

The Greek Orthodox Church played a pivotal role in the preservation of national identity, the development of Greek society and the resurgence of Greek nationalism. (Note: Georgiadis–Arnakis argues that the Church of Constantinople conducted "a magnificent work of national conservation", and contributed to the national liberation of all the subject nationalities of the Balkan peninsula.) From the early 18th century and onwards, members of prominent Greek families in Constantinople, known as Phanariotes (after the Phanar district of the city), gained considerable control over Ottoman foreign policy and eventually over the bureaucracy as a whole.

==== Klephts and armatoloi ====
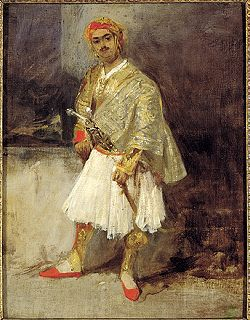
Portrait of a Greek armatolos by Richard Parkes Bonington (oil painting, 1825–1826, Benaki Museum)

In times of militarily weak central authority, the Balkan countryside became overrun by groups of bandits called "klephts" (Greek: κλέφτες) (the Greek equivalent of the hajduks) that struck at Muslims and Christians alike. Defying Ottoman rule, the klephts were highly admired and held a significant place in popular lore.

Responding to the klephts' attacks, the Ottomans recruited the ablest amongst these groups, contracting Christian militias, known as "armatoloi" (Greek: αρματολοί), to secure endangered areas, especially mountain passes. (Note: In the Morea, there did not exist any armatoloi; wealthy landowners and primates hired the kapoi serving as personal bodyguards and rural police.) The area under their control was called an "armatolik", the oldest known being established in Agrafa during the reign of Murad II (r. 1421–1451). The distinction between klephts and armatoloi was not clear, as the latter would often turn into klephts to extort more benefits from the authorities, while, conversely, another klepht group would be appointed to the armatolik to confront their predecessors.

Nevertheless, klephts and armatoloi formed a provincial elite, though not a social class, whose members would muster under a common goal. As the armatoloi's position gradually turned into a hereditary one, some captains took care of their armatolik as their personal property. A great deal of power was placed in their hands and they integrated in the network of clientelist relationships that formed the Ottoman administration. Some managed to establish exclusive control in their armatolik, forcing the Porte to try repeatedly, though unsuccessfully, to eliminate them.

By the time of the War of Independence, powerful armatoloi could be traced in Rumeli, Thessaly, Epirus and southern Macedonia. To the revolutionary leader and writer Yannis Makriyannis, klephts and armatoloi—being the only available major military force on the side of the Greeks—played such a crucial role in the Greek revolution that he referred to them as the "yeast of liberty". Contrary to conventional Greek history, many of the klephts and armatoles participated at the Greek War of Independence according to their own militaristic patron-client terms. They saw the war as an economic and political opportunity to expand their areas of operation. Balkan bandits such as the klephts and armatoles glorified in nationalist historiography as national heroes—were actually driven by economic interests, were not aware of national projects, made alliances with the Ottomans and robbed Christians as much as Muslims. Nevertheless, they seldom robbed common folk, from whose ranks they came, and more often raided Turks, with whom they were separated by religion, nationality, and social class. They enjoyed the support of the generally oppressed common folk, as they were in opposition to established authority. A vast oral tradition of folk poetry attests to the sympathy they evoked and their reputation for patriotism. Some famous armatoles leaders were Odysseas Androutsos, Georgios Karaiskakis, Athanasios Diakos, Markos Botsaris and Giannis Stathas.

=== Enlightenment and the Greek national movement ===
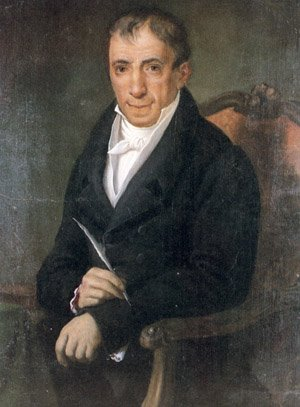
Adamantios Korais

Due to economic developments within and outside the Ottoman Empire in the 18th century, Greek merchants and sailors became affluent and generated the wealth necessary to found schools and libraries, and to pay for young Greeks to study at the universities of Western Europe. There they came into contact with the radical ideas of the European Enlightenment, the French Revolution and romantic nationalism. Educated and influential members of the large Greek diaspora, such as Adamantios Korais and Anthimos Gazis, tried to transmit these ideas back to the Greeks, with the double aim of raising their educational level and simultaneously strengthening their national identity. This was achieved through the dissemination of books, pamphlets and other writings in Greek, in a process that has been described as the modern Greek Enlightenment (Greek: Διαφωτισμός).

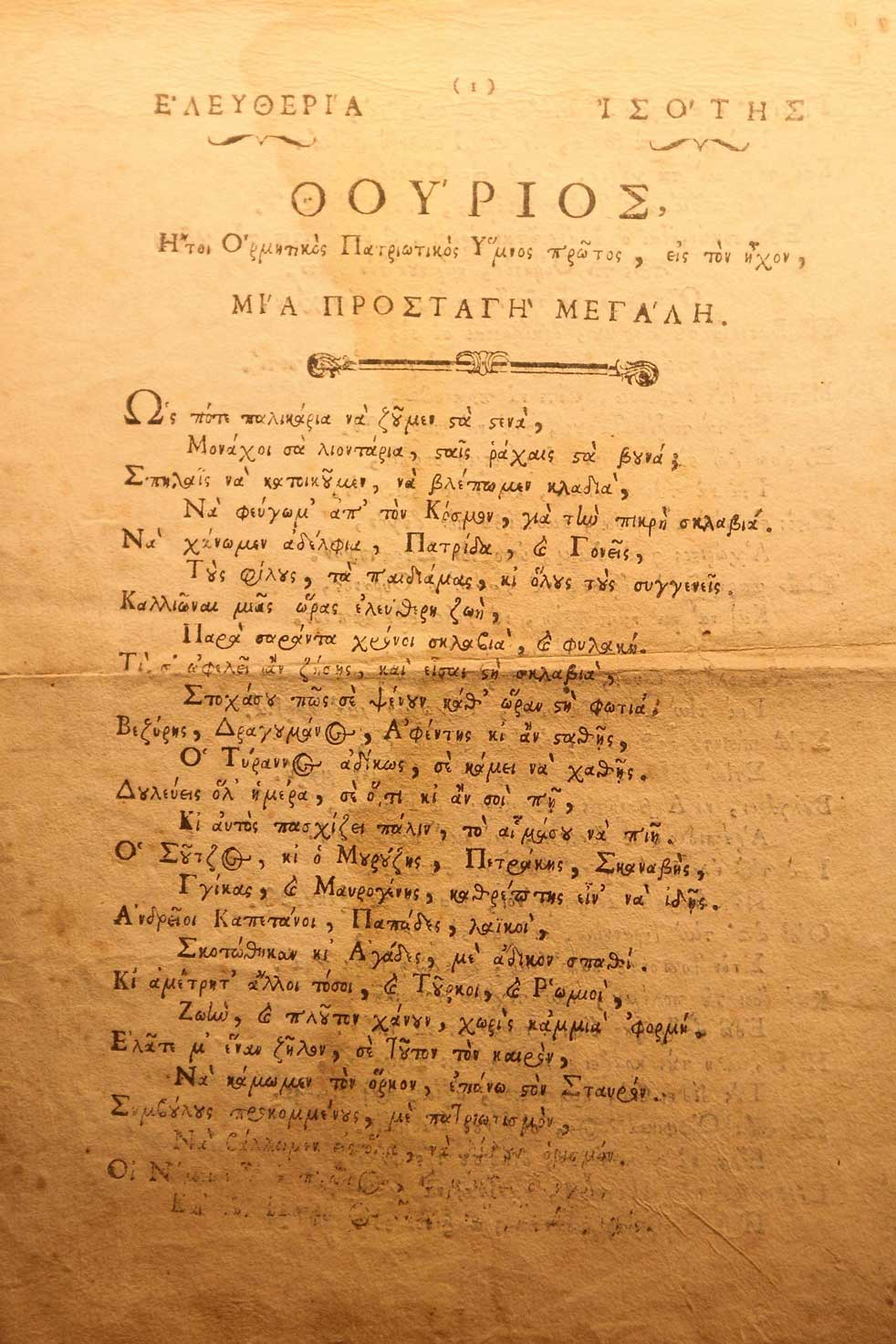
Cover of "Thourios" by Rigas Feraios; intellectual, revolutionary and forerunner of the Greek Revolution.

Crucial for the development of the Greek national idea were the Russo-Turkish Wars of the 18th century. Peter the Great had envisaged a disintegration of the Ottoman Empire and the re-institution of a new Byzantine Empire with an Orthodox emperor. His Pruth River Campaign of 1711 set a precedent for the Greeks, when Peter appealed to Orthodox Christians to join the Russians and rise against the Turks to fight for "faith and homeland". The Russo-Turkish wars of Catherine II (1762–1796) made the Greeks consider their emancipation with the aid of Russia. An independence movement in Peloponnesus (Morea) was incited by Russian agents in 1769, and a Greek flotilla under Lambros Katsonis assisted the Russian fleet in the war of 1788–1792. The Greek revolts of the 18th century were unsuccessful but far larger than the revolts of previous centuries, and they laid the foundation for a national revolution.

Revolutionary nationalism grew across Europe during the 18th and 19th centuries (including in the Balkans), due to the influence of the French Revolution. As the power of the Ottoman Empire declined, Greek nationalism began to assert itself. The most influential of the Greek writers and intellectuals was Rigas Feraios. Deeply influenced by the French Revolution, Rigas was the first to conceive and organize a comprehensive national movement aiming at the liberation of all Balkan nations—including the Turks of the region—and the creation of a "Balkan Republic". Arrested by Austrian officials in Trieste in 1797, he was handed over to Ottoman officials and transported to Belgrade along with his co-conspirators. All of them were strangled to death in June 1798 and their bodies were dumped in the Danube. The death of Rigas fanned the flames of Greek nationalism; his nationalist poem, the "Thourios" (war-song), was translated into a number of Western European and later Balkan languages and served as a rallying cry for Greeks against Ottoman rule.

Better an hour of free life
Than forty years of slavery and prison.

Rigas Feraios, approx. translation from his "Thourios" poem.

Another influential Greek writer and intellectual was Adamantios Korais, who witnessed the French Revolution. Korais' primary intellectual inspiration was from the Enlightenment, and he borrowed ideas from Thomas Hobbes, John Locke and Jean-Jacques Rousseau. When Korais was a young adult, he moved to Paris to continue his studies. He eventually graduated from the Montpellier School of Medicine and spent the remainder of his life in Paris. He would often have political and philosophical debates with Thomas Jefferson. While in Paris he was a witness to the French Revolution and saw the democracy that came out of it. He spent a lot of his time convincing wealthy Greeks to build schools and libraries to further the education of Greeks. He believed that a furthering in education would be necessary for the general welfare and prosperity of the people of Greece, as well as the country. Korais' ultimate goal was a democratic Greece much like the Golden Age of Pericles.

The Greek cause began to draw support not only from the large Greek merchant diaspora in both Western Europe and Russia, but also from Western European Philhellenes. This Greek movement for independence was not only the first movement of national character in Eastern Europe, but also the first one in a non-Christian environment, like the Ottoman Empire.

=== Filiki Eteria ===
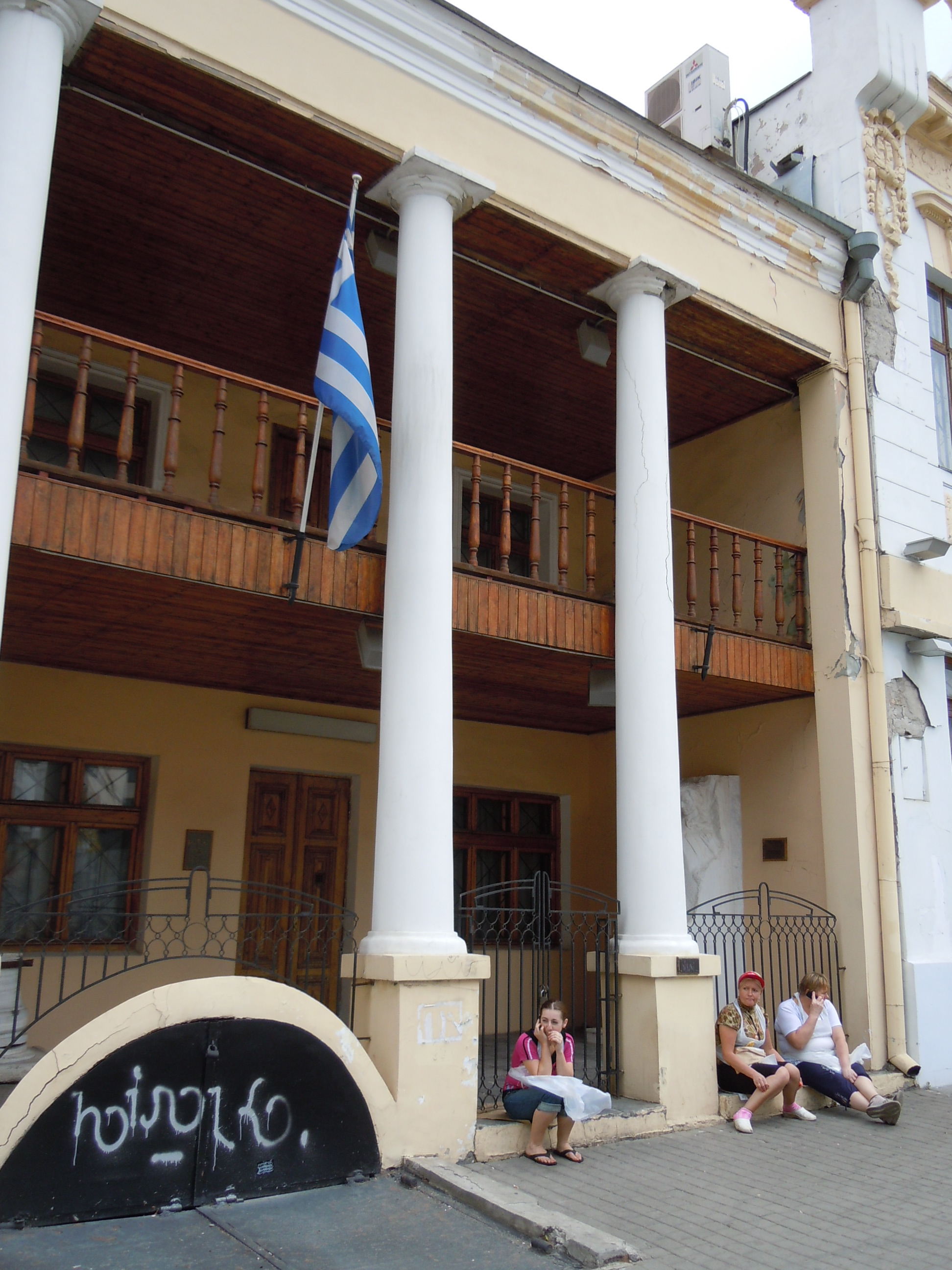
House of Filiki Eteria on Greek Square in Odesa

Feraios' martyrdom was to inspire three young Greek merchants: Nikolaos Skoufas, Emmanuil Xanthos, and Athanasios Tsakalov. Influenced by the Italian Carbonari and profiting from their own experience as members of Freemasonic organizations, they founded in 1814 the secret Filiki Eteria ("Friendly Society") in Odessa, an important center of the Greek mercantile diaspora in Russia. With the support of wealthy Greek exile communities in Britain and the United States and with the aid of sympathizers in Western Europe, they planned the rebellion.

The society's basic objective was a revival of the Byzantine Empire, with Constantinople as the capital, not the formation of a national state. In early 1820, Ioannis Kapodistrias, an official from the Ionian Islands who had become the joint foreign minister of Tsar Alexander I, was approached by the Society in order to be named leader but declined the offer; the Filikoi (members of Filiki Eteria) then turned to Alexander Ypsilantis, a Phanariote serving in the Russian army as general and adjutant to Alexander, who accepted.

The Filiki Eteria expanded rapidly and was soon able to recruit members in all areas of the Greek world and among all elements of the Greek society. (Note: Clogg asserts that uncertainty surrounds the total number of those recruited into the Filiki Eteria. According to Clogg, recruiting was carried out in the Danubian principalities, southern Russia, the Ionian islands and the Peloponnese. Few were recruited in Rumeli, the Aegean islands or Asia Minor.)

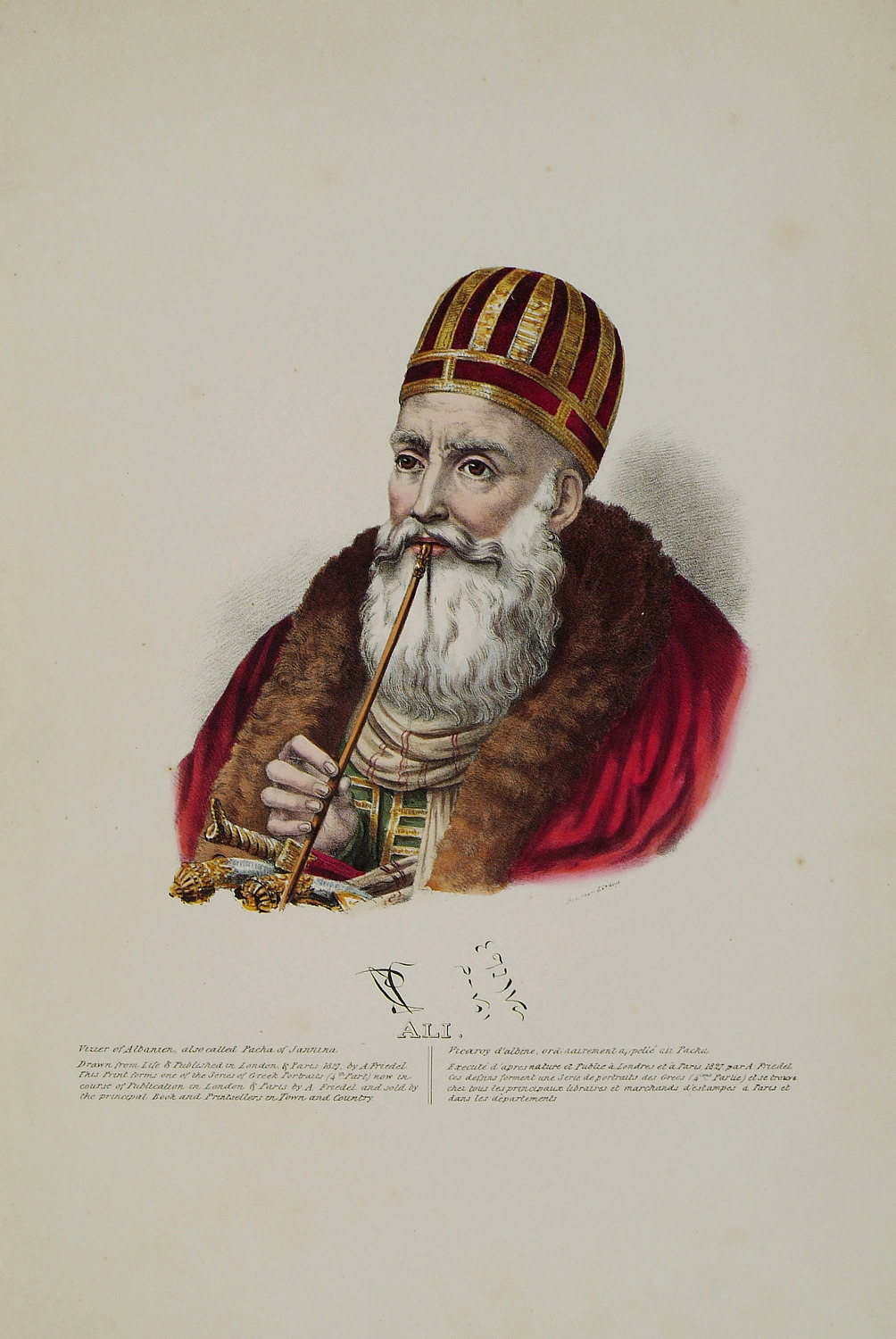
Ali, Vizier of Albania, also called Pacha of Jannina by Adam Friedel, drawn from life and published in 1828.

In 1821, the Ottoman Empire mainly faced war against Persia and more particularly the revolt by the de facto independent Albanian ruler Ali Pasha of the Pashalik of Yanina, which had forced the vali (governor) of the Morea, Hursid Pasha, and other local pashas to leave their provinces and campaign against the rebel force. The Greek uprising in the Morea began as an extension of Ali Pasha's revolt in Albania. To the Porte the Greek uprising was at the beginning only one of the many regional revolts.

At the same time, the Great Powers, allied in the "Concert of Europe" in opposition to revolutions in the aftermath of Napoleon I of France, were preoccupied with revolts in Italy and Spain. It was in this context that the Greeks judged the time ripe for their own revolt. The plan originally involved uprisings in three places, the Peloponnese, the Danubian Principalities and Constantinople.

== Philhellenism ==
The mountains look on Marathon –
And Marathon looks on the sea;
And musing there an hour alone,
I dream'd that Greece might yet be free
For, standing on the Persians' grave,
I could not deem myself a slave.
...
Must we but weep o'er days more blest?
Must we but blush? – Our fathers bled.
Earth! render back from out thy breast
A remnant of our Spartan dead!
Of the three hundred grant but three,
To make a new Thermopylae.

Byron, The Isles of Greece

Because of the Greek origin of so much of the West's classical heritage, there was tremendous sympathy for the Greek cause throughout Europe. Some wealthy Americans and Western European aristocrats, such as the renowned poet Lord Byron and later the American physician Samuel Howe, took up arms to join the Greek revolutionaries. In Britain there was strong support led by the Philosophical Radicals, the Whigs, and the Evangelicals. Many helped to finance the revolution. The London Philhellenic Committee helped insurgent Greece to float two loans in 1824 (£800,000) and 1825 (£2,000,000). The Scottish philhellene Thomas Gordon took part in the revolutionary struggle and later documented some of the first histories of the Greek Revolution in English.

In Europe, the Greek revolt aroused widespread sympathy among the public, although at first it was met with lukewarm and negative reception from the Great Powers. Some historians argue that Ottoman atrocities were given wide coverage in Europe, while Greek atrocities tended to be suppressed or played down. The Ottoman massacres at Chios in 1822 inspired Eugène Delacroix's famous painting Massacre of Chios; other philhellenic works by Delacroix were inspired by Byron's poems. Byron, the most celebrated philhellene of all, lent his name, prestige and wealth to the cause.

Byron organized funds and supplies (including the provision of several ships), but died from fever at Missolonghi in 1824. Byron's death strengthened European sympathy for the Greek cause. His poetry, along with Delacroix's art, helped arouse European public opinion in favor of the Greek revolutionaries to the point of no return, and led Western powers to intervene directly.

Philhellenism made a notable contribution to romanticism, enabling the younger generation of artistic and literary intellectuals to expand the classical repertoire by treating modern Greek history as an extension of ancient history; the idea of a regeneration of the spirit of ancient Greece permeated the rhetoric of the Greek cause's supporters. Classicists and romantics of that period envisioned the casting out of the Turks as the prelude to the revival of the Golden Age.

== History ==
=== Outbreak of the revolution ===
==== Danubian principalities ====
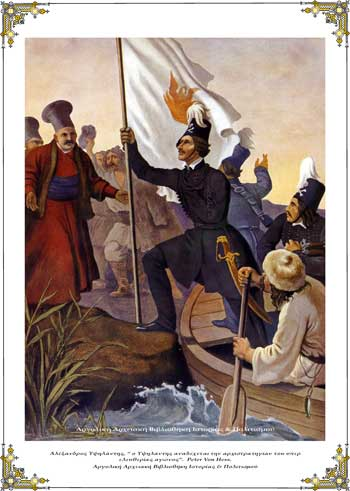
Alexander Ypsilantis crosses the Pruth, by Peter von Hess (Benaki Museum, Athens)

Alexander Ypsilantis was elected as the head of the Filiki Eteria in April 1820 and took upon himself the task of planning the insurrection. His intention was to raise all the Christians of the Balkans in rebellion and perhaps force Russia to intervene on their behalf. On 22 February [N.S. 6 March], he crossed the river Prut with his followers, entering the Danubian Principalities. In order to encourage the local Romanian Christians to join him, he announced that he had "the support of a Great Power", implying Russia. Two days after crossing the Prut, at Three Holy Hierarchs Monastery in Iași (Jassy), the capital of Moldavia, Ypsilantis issued a proclamation calling all Greeks and Christians to rise up against the Ottomans:

Fight for Faith and Fatherland! The time has come, O Hellenes. Long ago the people of Europe, fighting for their own rights and liberties, invited us to imitation ... The enlightened peoples of Europe are occupied in restoring the same well-being, and, full of gratitude for the benefactions of our forefathers towards them, desire the liberation of Greece. We, seemingly worthy of ancestral virtue and of the present century, are hopeful that we will achieve their defense and help. Many of these freedom-lovers want to come and fight alongside us ... Who then hinders your manly arms? Our cowardly enemy is sick and weak. Our generals are experienced, and all our fellow countrymen are full of enthusiasm. Unite, then, O brave and magnanimous Greeks! Let national phalanxes be formed, let patriotic legions appear and you will see those old giants of despotism fall themselves, before our triumphant banners.

Michael Soutzos, then Prince of Moldavia and a member of Filiki Etaireia, set his guard at Ypsilantis' disposal. In the meanwhile, Patriarch Gregory V of Constantinople and the Synod had anathematized and excommunicated both Ypsilantis and Soutzos issuing many encyclicals, an explicit denunciation of the Revolution in line with the Orthodox Church's policy.

Instead of directly advancing on Brăila, where he arguably could have prevented Ottoman armies from entering the Principalities, and where he might have forced Russia to accept a fait accompli, Ypsilantis remained in Iaşi and ordered the executions of several pro-Ottoman Moldavians. In Bucharest, where he arrived in early April after some weeks delay, he decided that he could not rely on the Wallachian Pandurs to continue their Oltenian-based revolt and assist the Greek cause. The Pandur leader was Tudor Vladimirescu, who had already reached the outskirts of Bucharest on 16 March [N.S. 28 March]. In Bucharest, the relations of the two men deteriorated dramatically; Vladimirescu's first priority was to assert his authority against the newly appointed prince Scarlat Callimachi, trying to maintain relations with both Russia and the Ottomans.

At that point, Kapodistrias, the foreign minister of Russia, was ordered by Alexander I to send Ypsilantis a letter upbraiding him for misusing the mandate received from the Tsar; Kapodistrias announced to Ypsilantis that his name had been struck off the army list and that he was commanded to lay down arms. Ypsilantis tried to ignore the letter, but Vladimirescu took this as the end of his alliance with the Eteria. A conflict erupted inside the camp and Vladimirescu was tried and put to death by the Eteria on 26 May [N.S. 7 June]. The loss of their Romanian allies, followed by an Ottoman intervention on Wallachian soil, sealed defeat for the Greek exiles and culminated in the disastrous Battle of Dragashani and the destruction of the Sacred Band on 7 June [N.S. 19 June].

Important events of the first year of the war

Alexander Ypsilantis, accompanied by his brother Nicholas and a remnant of his followers, retreated to Râmnicu Vâlcea, where he spent some days negotiating with the Austrian authorities for permission to cross the frontier. Fearing that his followers might surrender him to the Turks, he gave out that Austria had declared war on Turkey, caused a Te Deum to be sung in Cozia Monastery, and on pretext of arranging measures with the Austrian commander-in-chief, he crossed the frontier. However, the reactionary policies of the Holy Alliance were enforced by Francis II and the country refused to give asylum for leaders of revolts in neighboring countries. Ypsilantis was kept in close confinement for seven years. In Moldavia, the struggle continued for a while, under Giorgakis Olympios and Yiannis Pharmakis, but by the end of the year the provinces had been pacified by the Ottomans.

The outbreak of the war was met by mass executions, pogrom-style attacks, the destruction of churches, and looting of Greek properties throughout the Empire. The most severe atrocities occurred in Constantinople, in what became known as the Constantinople Massacre of 1821. The Orthodox Patriarch Gregory V was executed on 22 April 1821 on the orders of the Sultan despite his opposition to the revolt, which caused outrage throughout Europe and resulted in increased support for the Greek rebels.

==== Peloponnese ====
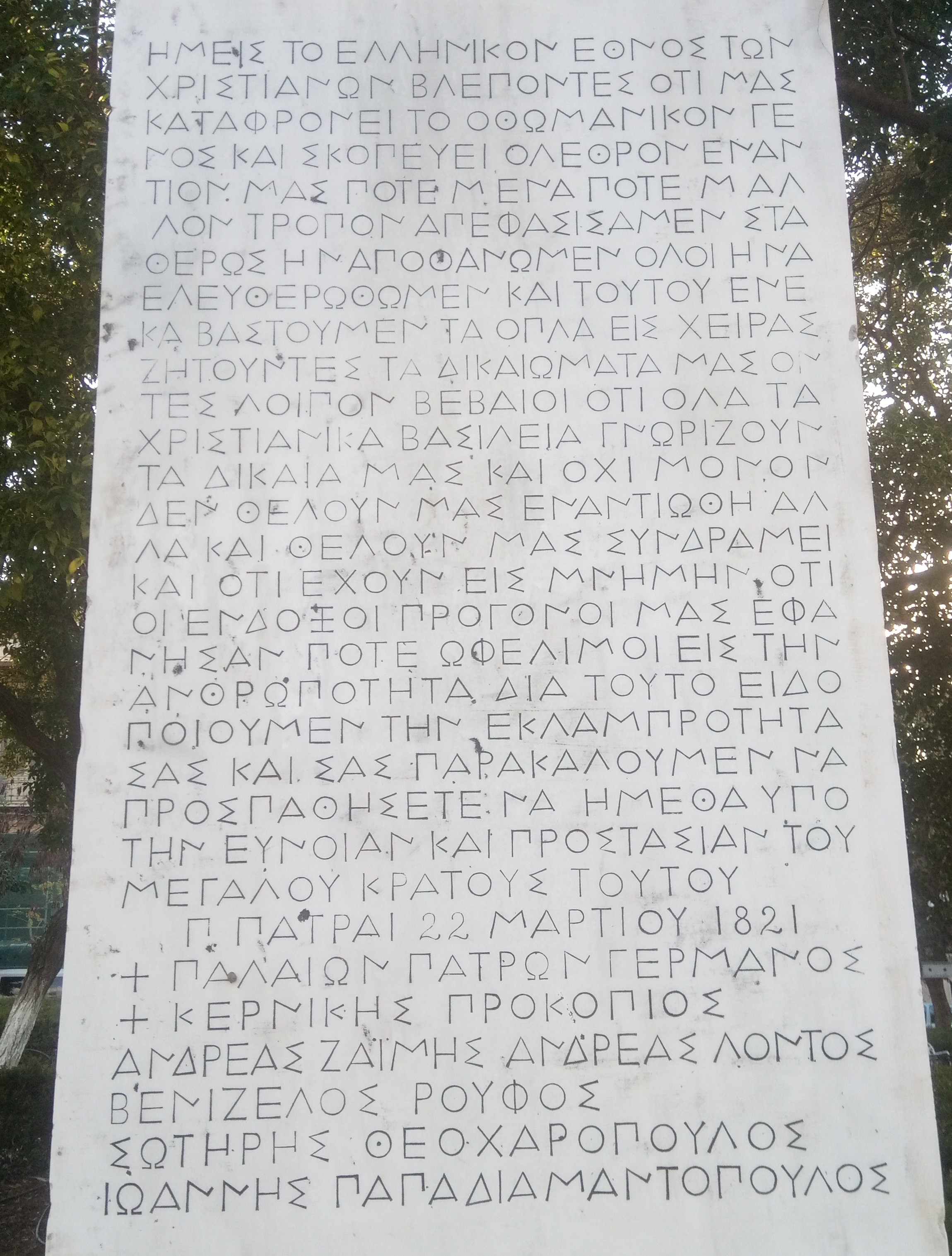
Declaration of the revolutionaries of Patras; engraved on a stele in the city

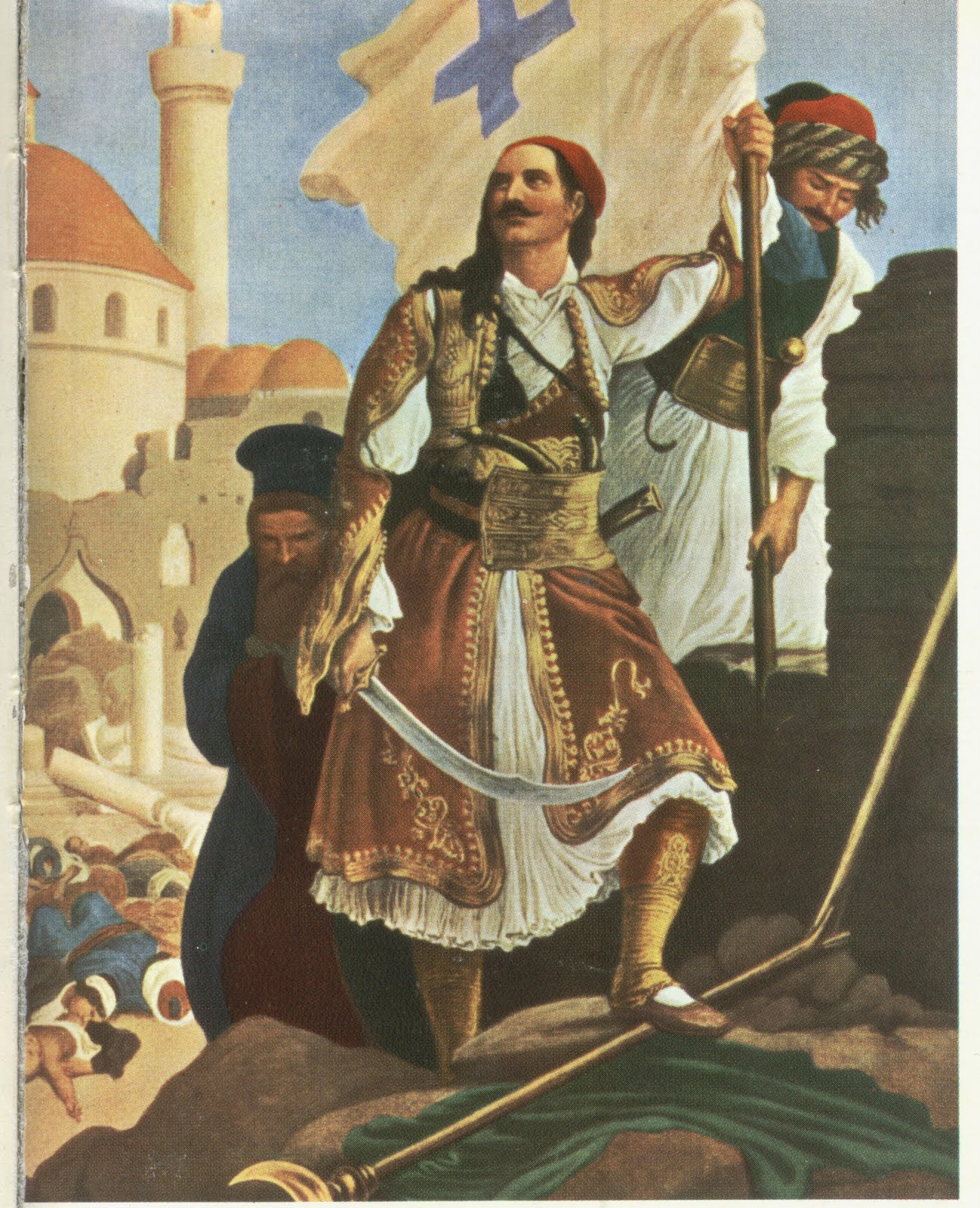
"Commander Kephalas plants the flag of Liberty upon the walls of Tripolizza" (Siege of Tripolitsa) by Peter von Hess.

The Peloponnese, with its long tradition of resistance to the Ottomans, was to become the heartland of the revolt. In the early months of 1821, with the absence of the Ottoman governor of the Morea (Mora valesi) Hursid Pasha and many of his troops, the situation was favourable for the Greeks to rise against Ottoman occupation. The crucial meeting was held at Vostitsa (modern Aigion), where chieftains and prelates from all over the Peloponnese assembled on 26 January. There, Papaflessas, a pro-revolution priest who presented himself as representative of Filiki Eteria, clashed with most of the civil leaders and members of the senior clergy, such as Metropolitan Germanos of Patras, who were sceptical and demanded guarantees about a Russian intervention.

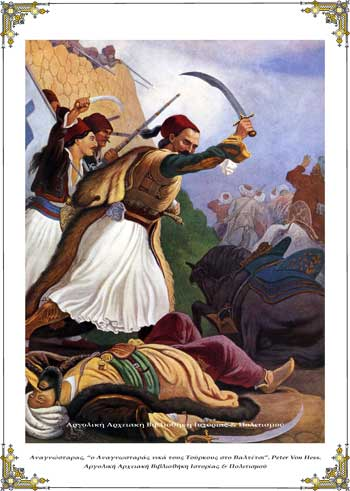
Anagnostaras during the Battle of Valtetsi by Peter von Hess.

As news came of Ypsilantis' march into the Danubian Principalities, the atmosphere in the Peloponnese was tense, and by mid-March, sporadic incidents against Muslims occurred, heralding the start of the uprising. According to oral tradition, the Revolution was declared on 25 March 1821 (N.S. 6 April) by Metropolitan Germanos of Patras, who raised the banner with the cross in the Monastery of Agia Lavra (near Kalavryta, Achaea) although some historians question the historicity of the event. Some claim that the story first appears in 1824 in a book written by a French diplomat François Pouqueville, whose book is full of inventions. Historian David Brewer noted that Pouqueville was an Anglophobe, and in his account of the speech by Germanos in his book, Pouqueville has the Metropolitan express Anglophobic sentiments similar to those commonly expressed in France, and has him praise France as Greece's one true friend in the world, which led Brewer to conclude that Pouqueville had made the entire story up. However, a study on the archive of Hugues Pouqueville (François Pouqueville's brother) claims that François' account was accurate, without making any reference to the purported Anglophobia or Francophilia of Germanos. Also, some European newspapers of June and July 1821 published the news of declaration of revolution by Germanos either in Patras on 6 April/25 March 1821 or in the "Monastery of Velia Mountain" (Agia Lavra) on a non-specified date.

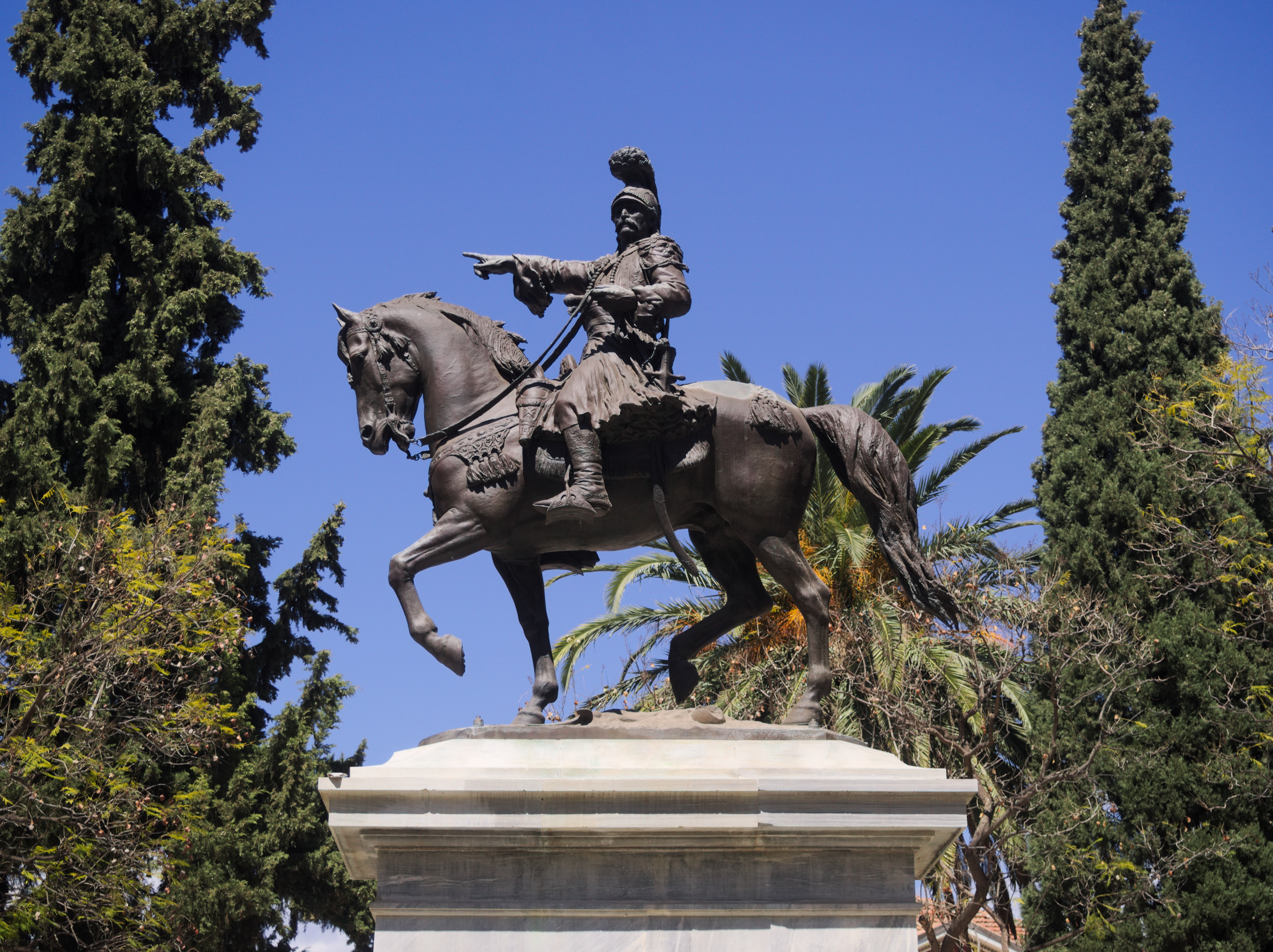
Statue of Theodoros Kolokotronis, Nafplio

On 17 March 1821, war was declared on the Turks by the Maniots in Areopoli. The same day, a force of 2,000 Maniots under the command of Petros Mavromichalis advanced on the Messenian town of Kalamata, where they united with troops under Theodoros Kolokotronis, Nikitaras and Papaflessas; Kalamata fell to the Greeks on 23 March. In Achaia, the town of Kalavryta was besieged on 21 March, and in Patras conflicts lasted for many days. The Ottomans launched sporadic attacks towards the city while the revolutionaries, led by Panagiotis Karatzas, drove them back to the fortress.

By the end of March, the Greeks effectively controlled the countryside, while the Turks were confined to the fortresses, most notably those of Patras (recaptured by the Turks on 3 April by Yussuf Pasha), Rio, Acrocorinth, Monemvasia, Nafplion and the provincial capital, Tripolitsa, where many Muslims had fled with their families at the beginning of the uprising. All these were loosely besieged by local irregular forces under their own captains, since the Greeks lacked artillery. With the exception of Tripolitsa, all cities had access to the sea and could be resupplied and reinforced by the Ottoman fleet. Since May, Kolokotronis organized the siege of Tripolitsa, and, in the meantime, Greek forces twice defeated the Turks, who unsuccessfully tried to repulse the besiegers. Finally, Tripolitsa was seized by the Greeks on 23 September [N.S. 5 October], and the city was given over to the mob for two days. After lengthy negotiations, the Turkish forces surrendered Acrocorinth on 14 January 1822.

==== Central Greece ====
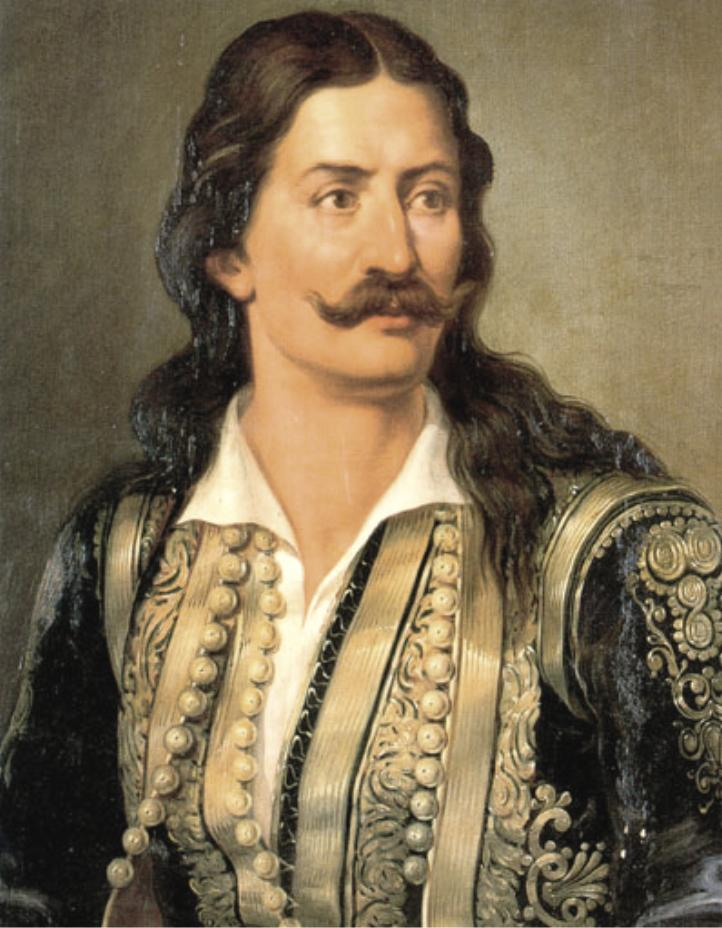
Portrait of Athanasios Diakos

The first regions to revolt in Central Greece (then known as Roumeli) were Phocis on 24 March and Salona on 27 March. In Boeotia, Livadeia was captured by Athanasios Diakos on 31 March, followed by Thebes two days later. When the revolution began, most of the Christian population of Athens fled to Salamis. Missolonghi revolted on 25 May, and the revolution soon spread to other cities of western Central Greece. The Ottoman commander in the Roumeli was the Albanian general Omer Vrioni who became infamous for his "Greek hunts" in Attica, which was described thus: "One of his favourite amusements was a 'Greek hunt' as the Turks called it. They would go out in parties of fifty to a hundred, mounted on fleet horses, and scour the open country in search of Greek peasantry, who might from necessity or hardihood have ventured down upon the plains. After capturing some, they would give the poor creatures a certain distance to start ahead, hoping to escape, and then try the speed of their horses in overtaking them, the accuracy of their pistols in firing at them as they ran, or the keenness of their sabres' edge in cutting off their heads". Those not cut down or shot down during the "Greek hunts" were impaled afterwards when captured.

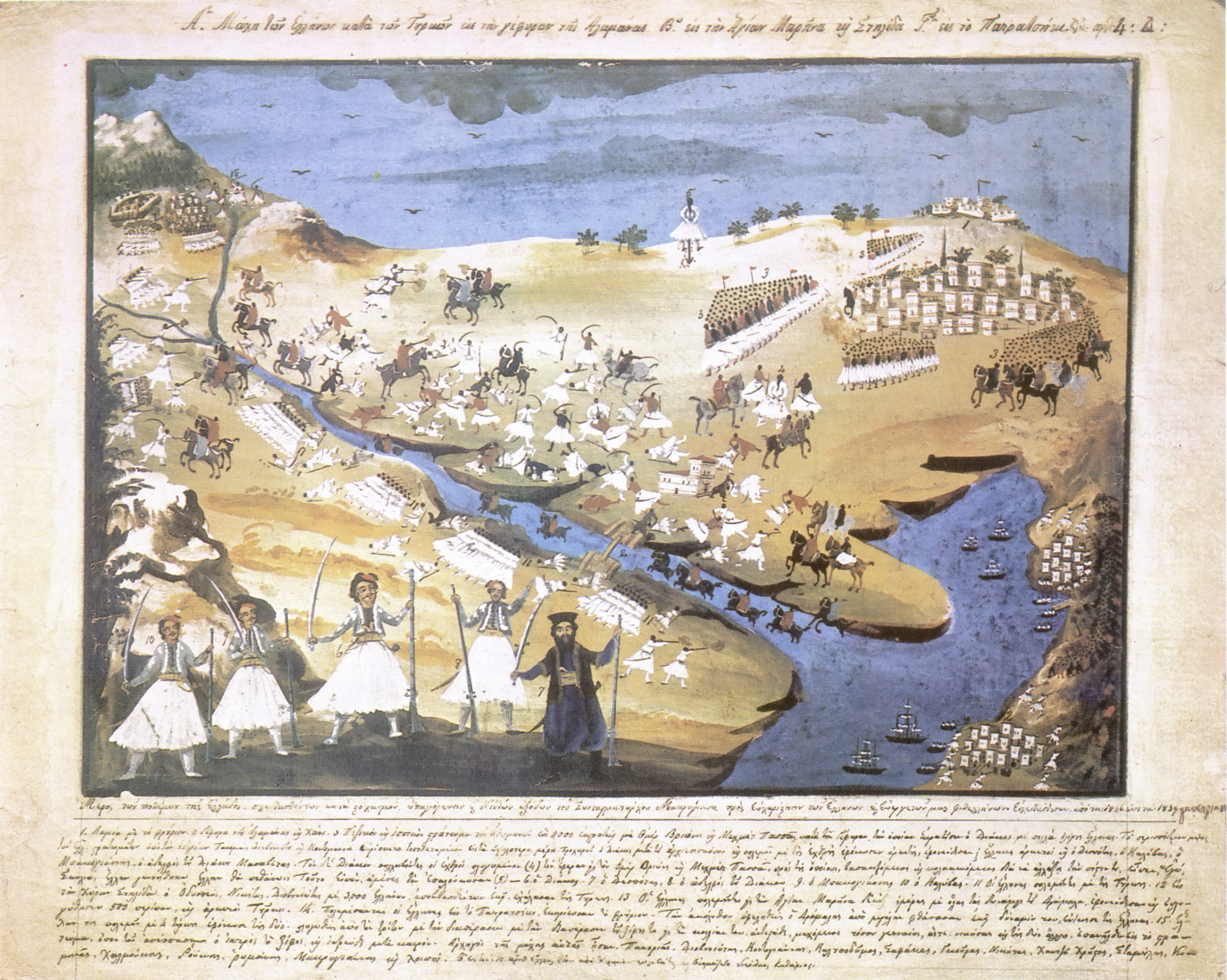
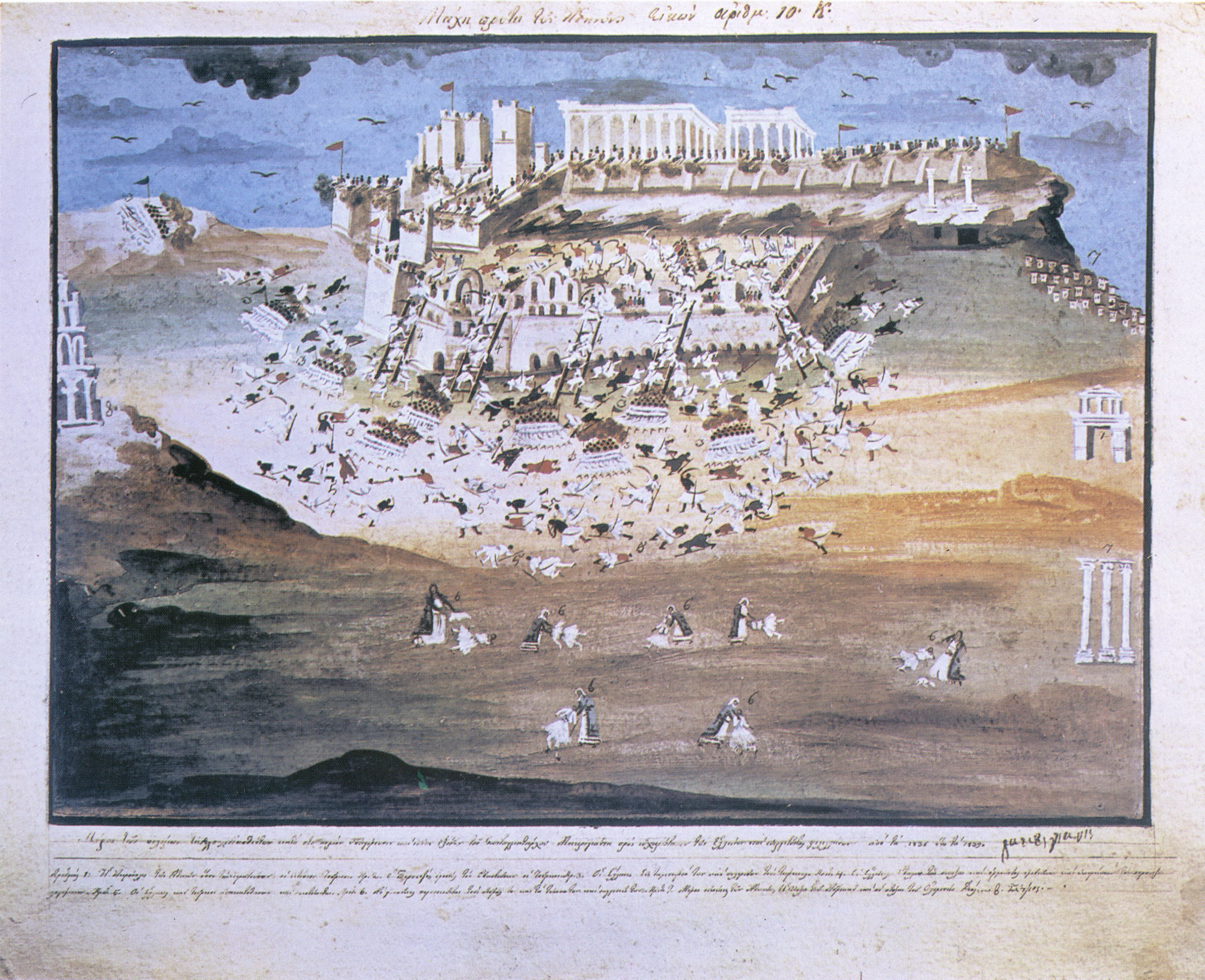
Panagiotis Zographos illustrates under the guidance of General Makriyannis the battles of Alamana (left) and Acropolis (right) (from his Scenes from the Greek War of Independence).

The initial Greek successes were soon put in peril after two subsequent defeats at the battles of Alamana and Eleftherohori against the army of Omer Vrioni. Another significant loss for the Greeks was the death of Diakos, a promising military leader, who was captured in Alamana and executed by the Turks when he refused to declare allegiance to the Sultan. The Greeks managed to halt the Turkish advance at the Battle of Gravia under the leadership of Odysseas Androutsos, who, with a handful of men, inflicted heavy casualties upon the Turkish army. After his defeat and the successful retreat of Androutsos' force, Omer Vrioni postponed his advance towards Peloponnese awaiting reinforcements; instead, he invaded Livadeia, which he captured on 10 June, and Athens, where he lifted the siege of the Acropolis. After a Greek force of 2,000 men managed to destroy at Vassilika a Turkish relief army on its way to Vrioni, the latter abandoned Attica in September and retreated to Ioannina. By the end of 1821, the revolutionaries had managed to temporarily secure their positions in Central Greece.

==== The Ottoman reaction ====
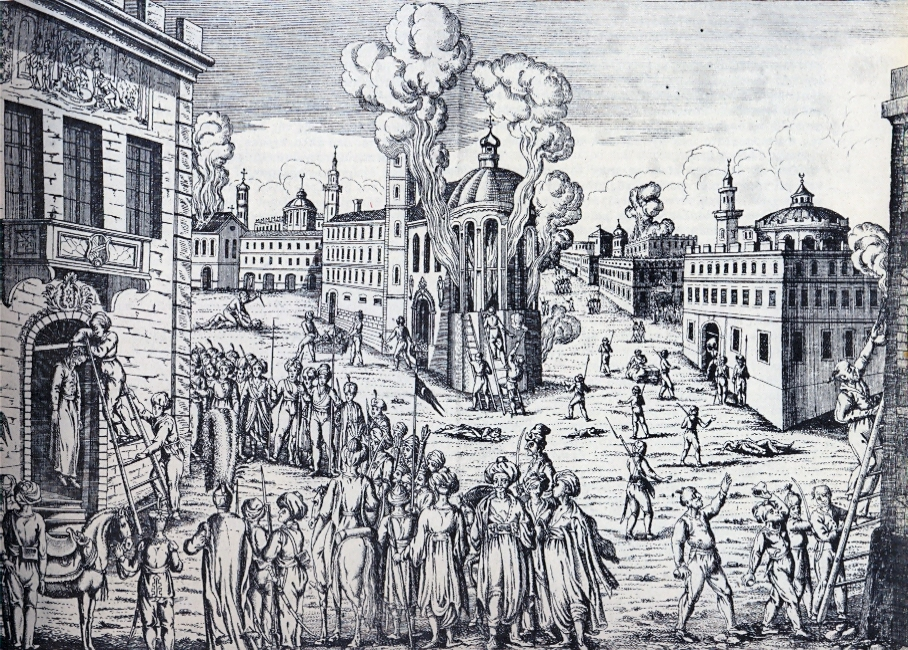
Atrocities against the Greek population of Constantinople, April 1821. Patriarch Gregory V was executed by the Ottoman authorities.

The news that the Greeks had revolted sparked murderous fury all over the Ottoman Empire. In Constantinople, on Easter Sunday, the Patriarch of the Greek Orthodox Church, Gregory V, was publicly hanged although he had condemned the revolution and preached obedience to the Sultan in his sermons. Since the revolution began in March, the Sublime Porte had executed at random various prominent Greeks living in Constantinople, such as the serving Dragoman of the Porte and two retired dragomans, a number of wealthy bankers and merchants, including a member of the ultra-rich Mavrokordatos family, three monks and a priest of the Orthodox church, and three ordinary Greeks accused of planning to poison the city's water supply. In the city of Smyrna (modern İzmir, Turkey), which until 1922 was a mostly Greek city, Ottoman soldiers drawn from the interior of Anatolia on their way to fight in either Greece or Moldavia/Wallachia, staged a pogrom in June 1821 against the Greeks, leading Gordon to write: "3,000 ruffians assailed the Greek quarter, plundered the houses and slaughtered the people; Smyrna resembled a place taken by assault, neither age or sex being respected". When a local mullah was asked to give a fatwa justifying the murder of Christians by Muslims and refused, he too was promptly killed.

==== International reaction ====
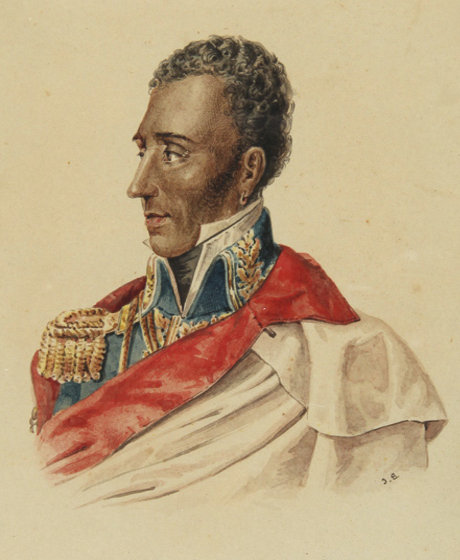
Jean-Pierre Boyer, President of Haiti. Haiti was the first state to recognise the Greek independence.

The news of the revolution was greeted with dismay by the conservative leaders of Europe, committed to upholding the system established at the Congress of Vienna, but was greeted with enthusiasm by many ordinary people across Europe. After the execution of the Patriarch Gregory V, the Russian Emperor Alexander I broke off diplomatic relations with the Sublime Porte after his foreign minister Count Ioannis Kapodistrias sent an ultimatum demanding promises from the Ottomans to stop executing Orthodox priests, which the Porte did not see fit to answer. In the summer of 1821, various young men from all over Europe began to gather in the French port of Marseille to book a passage to Greece and join the revolution. The French philhellene Jean-François-Maxime Raybaud wrote when he heard of the revolution in March 1821, "I learnt with a thrill that Greece was shaking off her chains" and in July 1821 boarded a ship going to Greece. Between the summer of 1821 and end of 1822, when the French started to inspect ships leaving Marseille for philhellenes, some 360 volunteers travelled to Greece. From the United States came the doctor Samuel Gridley Howe and the soldier George Jarvis to fight with the Greeks. The largest contingents came from the German states, France and the Italian states.

In Nafplio, a monument to honor the philhellenes who died fighting in the war listed 274 names, of which 100 are from Germany, forty each from France and Italy, and the rest from Britain, Spain, Hungary, Sweden, Portugal and Denmark.

The Reception of Lord Byron at Missolonghi by Theodoros Vryzakis

In Germany, Italy and France many clergymen and university professors gave speeches saying all of Europe owed a huge debt to ancient Greece, that the modern Greeks were entitled to call upon the classical heritage as a reason for support, and that Greece would only achieve progress with freedom from the Ottoman Empire. A young medical student in Mannheim wrote that hearing his professor lecture on the need for Greek freedom went through him like an electric shock, inspiring him to drop his studies and head to Greece, while a Danish student wrote: "How could a man inclined to fight for freedom and justice find a better place than next to the oppressed Greeks?". In France, Britain, Spain, Russia, the United States, and many other places "Greek committees" were established to raise funds and supplies for the revolution.

Citizens of the United States, from elite as well as modest socioeconomic backgrounds, supported the Greek cause, donating money and supplies to numerous philhellenic groups in both the northern and southern United States. The classicist Edward Everett, a professor of Ancient Greek literature at Harvard University, was active in championing the Greek cause in the United States and in November 1821 published an appeal from Adamantios Korais reading "To the Citizens of the United States, it is your land that Liberty has fixed her abode, so you will not assuredly imitate the culpable indifference or rather the long ingratitude of the Europeans", going on to call for American intervention, in several American newspapers. In 1821, the Greek committee in Charleston, South Carolina sent the Greeks 50 barrels of salted meat while the Greek Committee in Springfield, Massachusetts sent supplies of salted meat, sugar, fish and flour. Newspapers in the United States gave the war much coverage and were overwhelmingly pro-Greek in their stance, which explains why American public opinion was so supportive. In New York City, one ball put on by the Greek committee raised $8,000 (~$180,000 in 2021). In Russia, the St. Petersburg Greek committee under Prince Alexander Golitsyn had raised 973,500 roubles by August 1822. By the end of the war, millions of roubles had been raised in Russia for the relief of refugees and to buy enslaved Greeks freedom (though the government forbade buying arms for the Greeks), but no Russian is known to have gone to fight with the Greeks.

The first independent state to recognise Greek independence was Haiti. Jean-Pierre Boyer, President of Haiti, wrote a letter on 15 January 1822 to four Greek expatriates living in France who had assembled themselves into a committee to seek international support for the Greek revolution. Boyer expressed sympathy for the Greek cause, though said that he was unable to provide financial or military support.

==== First administrative and political institutions ====
The flag of the Areopagus of Eastern Continental Greece with symbols of faith, charity (heart), and hope (anchor)

After the fall of Kalamata, the Messenian Senate, the first of the Greeks' local governing councils, held its inaugural session. At almost the same time, the Achean Directorate was summoned in Patras, but its members were soon forced to flee to Kalavryta. With the initiative of the Messenian Senate, a Peloponnesian assembly convened, and elected a Senate on 26 May. Most of the members of the Peloponnesian Senate were local notables (lay and ecclesiastical) or persons controlled by them.

The three major social groups that provided the leadership of the revolution were the primates (wealthy landowners who controlled about a third of the arable land in the Peloponnese), the captains drawn from the klephts and/or armatoles (klepts and armatoles tended to alternate), and the wealthy merchants, who were the most Westernised elements in Greek society. One of the more prominent leaders of the merchants and a "Westerniser" was the Phanariot Alexandros Mavrokordatos who was living with the poet Percy Bysshe Shelley and his wife Mary Shelley in Pisa when the revolution began, and upon hearing of the revolution, purchased supplies and a ship in Marseille and then set sail for Greece. Mavrokordatos's wealth, education (he was fluent in seven languages) and his experience as an Ottoman official ruling Wallachia led many to look towards him as a leader.

When Demetrios Ypsilantis arrived in Peloponnese as official representative of Filiki Eteria, he tried to assume control of the Revolution's affairs, and he thus proposed a new system of electing the members of the Senate, which was supported by the military leaders, but opposed by the notables. (Note: As Koliopoulos & Veremis argue, Ypsilantis proposed a smaller electorate, limited to the more "prestigious" men of the districts. On the other hand, the notables insisted on the principle of universal suffrage, because they were confident that they could secure the support of their people. They thus advocated "democratic" principles, while Ypsilantis and the military promoted "aristocratic" procedures. Koliopoulos & Veremis conclude that "Ypsilantis' assembly was essentially a royal chamber, while that of the local notables was closer to a parliament".) Assemblies convened also in Central Greece (November 1821) under the leadership of two Phanariots: Alexandros Mavrokordatos in the western part, and Theodoros Negris in the eastern part. These assemblies adopted two local statutes, the Charter of Western Continental Greece and the Legal Order of Eastern Continental Greece, drafted mainly by Mavrokordatos and Negris respectively. The statutes provided for the creation of two local administrative organs in Central Greece, an Areopagus in the east, and a Senate in the west. The three local statutes were recognized by the First National Assembly, but the respective administrative institutions were turned into administrative branches of the central government. They were later dissolved by the Second National Assembly.

==== Revolutionary activity in Crete, Macedonia and Cyprus ====
===== Crete =====
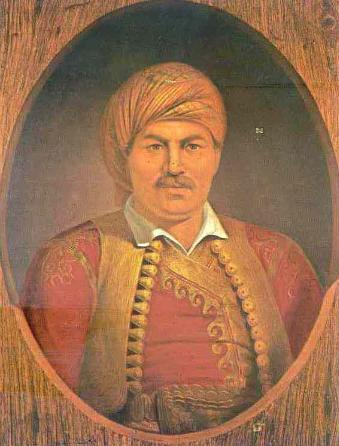
Hatzimichalis Dalianis, commander of the campaign to Crete, was killed in Frangokastello in 1828.

Cretan participation in the revolution was extensive, but it failed to achieve liberation from Turkish rule because of Egyptian intervention. Crete had a long history of resisting Turkish rule, exemplified by the folk hero Daskalogiannis, who was killed while fighting the Turks. In 1821, an uprising by Christians was met with a fierce response from the Ottoman authorities and the execution of several bishops, regarded as ringleaders.

Despite the Turkish reaction the rebellion persisted, and thus Sultan Mahmud II (r. 1808–1839) was forced to seek the aid of Muhammad Ali of Egypt, trying to lure him with the pashalik of Crete. On 28 May 1822, an Egyptian fleet of 30 warships and 84 transports arrived at Souda Bay led by Hasan Pasha, Muhammad Ali's son-in-law; he was tasked with ending the rebellion and did not waste any time in the burning of villages throughout Crete.

After Hasan's accidental death in February 1823, another son-in-law of Muhammad Ali of Egypt, Hussein Bey, led a well-organised and well-armed joint Turkish-Egyptian force of 12,000 soldiers with the support of artillery and cavalry. On 22 June 1823, Emmanouil Tombazis, appointed Commissioner of Crete by the Greek revolutionary government, held the Convention of Arcoudaina in an attempt to reconcile the factions of local captains and unite them against the common threat. He then gathered 3,000 men in Gergeri to face Hussein, but the Cretans were defeated by the much larger and better-organised force, and lost 300 men at the battle of Amourgelles on 20 August 1823. By the spring of 1824, Hussein had managed to limit the Cretan resistance to just a few mountain enclaves.

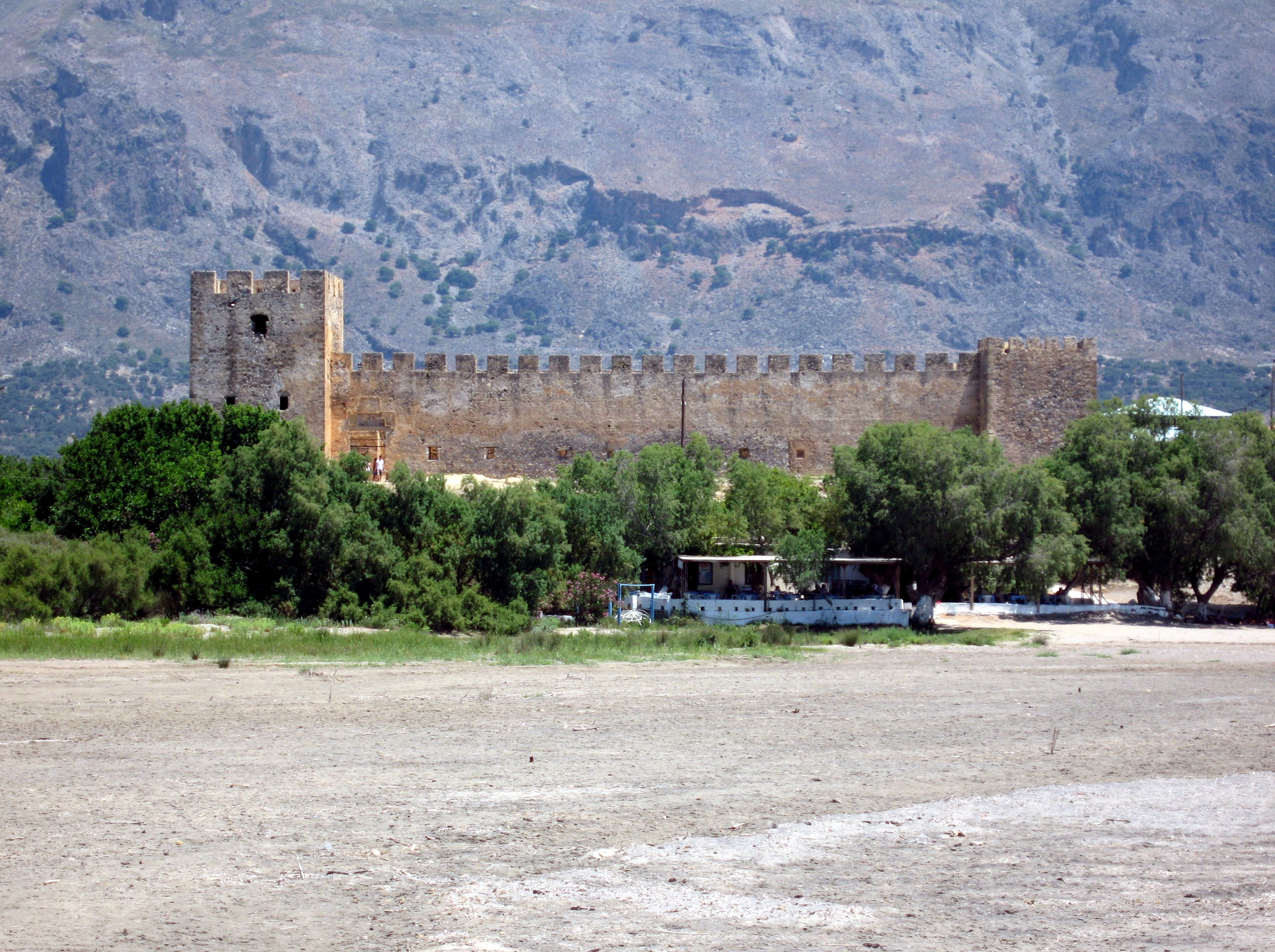
View of the Frangokastello

Towards the summer of 1825, a body of three to four hundred Cretans, who had fought with other Greeks in the Peloponnese, arrived in Crete and revitalized the Cretan insurgency (the so-called "Gramvousa period"). On 9 August 1825, led by Dimitrios Kallergis and Emmanouil Antoniadis, this group of Cretans captured the fort at Gramvousa and other insurgents captured the fort at Kissamos, and attempted to spread the insurgency further afield.

Although the Ottomans did not manage to retake the forts, they were successful in blocking the spread of the insurgency to the island's western provinces. The insurgents were besieged in Gramvousa for more than two years and they had to resort to piracy to survive. Gramvousa became a hive of piratical activity that greatly affected Turkish–Egyptian and European shipping in the region. During that period the population of Gramvousa became organised and built a school and a church dedicated to the Panagia i Kleftrina ("Our Lady the piratess")—St Mary as the patron of the klephts.

In January 1828, the Greek Epirote Hatzimichalis Dalianis landed in Crete with 700 men and in the following March took possession of Frangokastello, a castle in the Sfakia region. Soon the local Ottoman ruler, Mustafa Naili Pasha, attacked Frangokastello with an army of 8,000 men. The castle's defence was doomed after a seven-day siege and Dalianis perished along with 385 men. During 1828, Kapodistrias sent Mavrocordatos with British and French fleets to Crete to deal with the klephts and the pirates. This expedition resulted in the destruction of all pirate ships at Gramvousa and the fort came under British command.

===== Macedonia =====
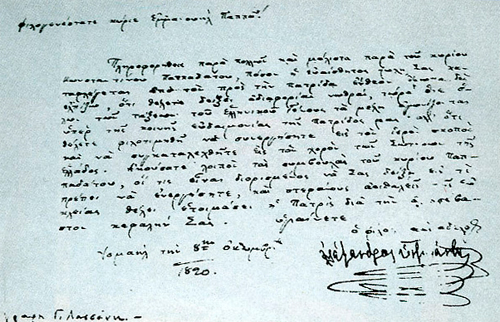
Letter of Alexander Ypsilantis to Emmanouel Pappas, dated 8 October 1820

The economic ascent of Thessaloniki and of the other urban centres of Macedonia coincided with the cultural and political renaissance of the Greeks. The ideals and patriotic songs of Rigas Feraios and others had made a profound impression upon the Thessalonians. Α few years later, the revolutionary fervour of the southern Greeks was to spread to these parts, and the seeds of Filiki Eteria were speedily to take root. The leader and coordinator of the revolution in Macedonia was Emmanouel Pappas from the village of Dobista, Serres, who was initiated into the Filiki Eteria in 1819. Pappas had considerable influence over the local Ottoman authorities, especially the local governor, Ismail Bey, and offered much of his personal wealth for the cause.

Following the instructions of Alexander Ypsilantis, that is to prepare the ground and to rouse the inhabitants of Macedonia to rebellion, Pappas loaded arms and munitions from Constantinople on a ship on 23 March and proceeded to Mount Athos, considering that this would be the most suitable spring-board for starting the insurrection. As Vacalopoulos notes, however, "adequate preparations for rebellion had not been made, nor were revolutionary ideals to be reconciled with the ideological world of the monks within the Athonite regime". On 8 May, the Turks, infuriated by the landing of sailors from Psara at Tsayezi, by the capture of Turkish merchants and the seizure of their goods, rampaged through the streets of Serres, searched the houses of the notables for arms, imprisoned the Metropolitan and 150 merchants, and seized their goods as a reprisal for the plundering by the Psarians.

In Thessaloniki, governor Yusuf Bey (the son of Ismail Bey) imprisoned in his headquarters more than 400 hostages, of whom more than 100 were monks from the monastic estates. He also wished to seize the powerful notables of Polygyros, who got wind of his intentions and fled. On 17 May, the Greeks of Polygyros took up arms, killed the local governor and 14 of his men, and wounded three others; they also repulsed two Turkish detachments. On 18 May, when Yusuf learned of the incidents at Polygyros and the spreading of the insurrection to the villages of Chalkidiki, he ordered half of his hostages to be slaughtered before his eyes. The Mulla of Thessalonica, Hayrıülah, gives the following description of Yusuf's retaliations:

Every day and every night you hear nothing in the streets of Thessaloniki but shouting and moaning. It seems that Yusuf Bey, the Yeniceri Agasi, the Subaşı, the hocas and the ulemas have all gone raving mad.

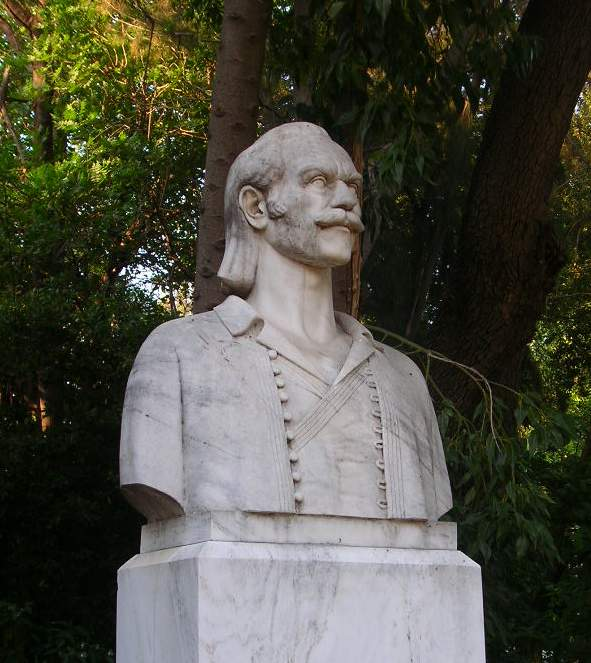
Bust of Emmanouel Pappas in Athens.

It would take until the end of the century for the city's Greek community to recover. The revolt, however, gained momentum in Mount Athos and Kassandra, and the island of Thasos joined it. Meanwhile, the revolt in Chalkidiki was progressing slowly and unsystematically. In June 1821 the insurgents tried to cut communications between Thrace and the south, attempting to prevent the serasker Haji Muhammad Bayram Pasha from transferring forces from Asia Minor to southern Greece. Even though the rebels delayed him, they were ultimately defeated at the pass of Rentina.

The insurrection in Chalkidiki was, from then on, confined to the peninsulas of Mount Athos and Kassandra. On 30 October 1821, an offensive led by the new Pasha of Thessaloniki, Muhammad Emin Abulubud, resulted in a decisive Ottoman victory at Kassandra. The survivors, among them Pappas, were rescued by the Psarian fleet, which took them mainly to Skiathos, Skopelos and Skyros. However, Pappas died en route to join the revolution at Hydra. Sithonia, Mount Athos and Thasos subsequently surrendered on terms.

Nevertheless, the revolt spread from Central to Western Macedonia, from Olympus to Pieria and Vermion. In the autumn of 1821, Nikolaos Kasomoulis was sent to southern Greece as the "representative of South-East Macedonia", and met Demetrios Ypsilantis. He then wrote to Papas from Hydra, asking him to visit Olympus to meet the captains there and to "fire them with the required patriotic enthusiasm". At the beginning of 1822, Anastasios Karatasos and Aggelis Gatsos arranged a meeting with other armatoloi; they decided that the insurrection should be based on three towns: Naoussa, Kastania, and Siatista.

In March 1822, Mehmed Emin secured decisive victories at Kolindros and Kastania. Further north, in the vicinity of Naousa, Zafeirakis Theodosiou, Karatasos and Gatsos organized the city's defense, and the first clashes resulted in a victory for the Greeks. Mehmed Emin then appeared before the town with 10,000 regular troops and 10,600 irregulars. Failing to get the insurgents to surrender, Mehmed Emin launched a number of attacks pushing them further back and finally captured Naousa in April, helped by the enemies of Zafeirakis, who had revealed an unguarded spot, the "Alonia". Reprisals and executions ensued, and women are reported to have flung themselves over the Arapitsa waterfall to avoid dishonor and being sold in slavery. Those who broke through the siege of Naousa fell back in Kozani, Siatista and Aspropotamos River, or were carried by the Psarian fleet to the northern Aegean islands.

===== Cyprus =====
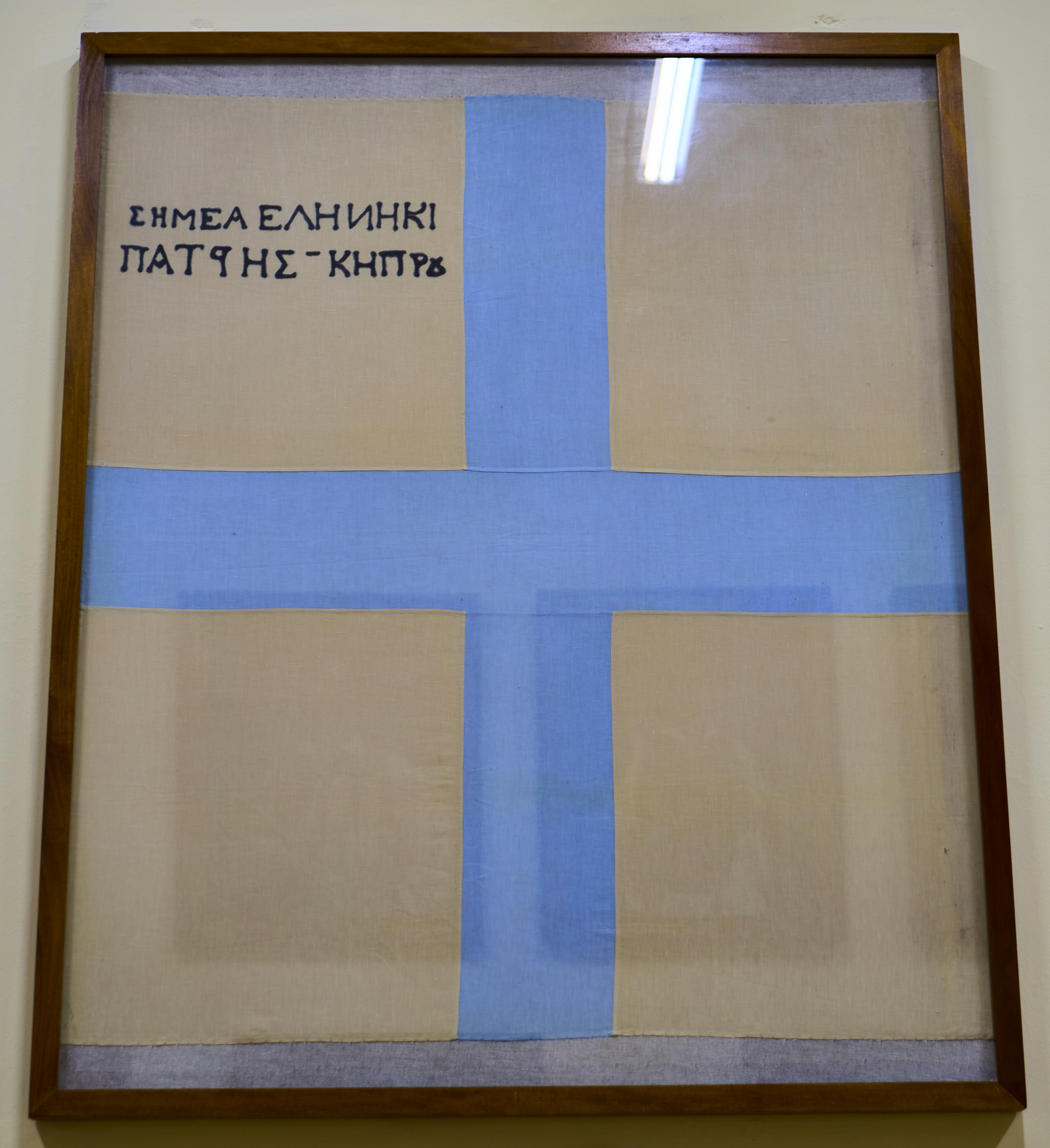
Flag of Cypriot fighters during the Greek War of Independence

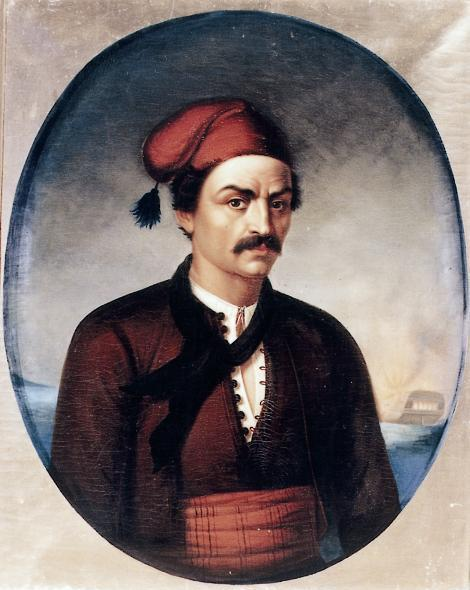
Konstantinos Kanaris during the Revolution

On 9 June 1821, 3 ships sailed to Cyprus with Konstantinos Kanaris. They landed at Asprovrisi of Lapithiou. Kanaris brought with him papers from the Filiki Etaireia and the ships were welcomed with rapturous applause and patriotic cries from the local Greeks of the area, who helped Kanaris and the soldiers from Cyprus as much as they could.

Kanaris brought with him to mainland Greece, Cypriots who created the "Column of Cypriots" («Φάλαγγα των Κυπρίων»), led by General Chatzipetros, which fought with extraordinary heroism in Greece. In total, over 1000 Cypriots fought in the War of Independence, many of whom died. At Missolonghi many were killed, and at the Battle of Athens in 1827, around 130 were killed. General Chatzipetros, showing military decorations declared "These were given to me by the heroism and braveness of the Column of Cypriots". In the National Library, there is a list of 580 names of Cypriots who fought in the War between 1821 and 1829.

The Cypriot battalion brought with them their own distinctive war banner, consisting of a white flag with a large blue cross, and the words GREEK FLAG OF THE MOTHERLAND CYPRUS emblazoned in the top left corner. The flag was hoisted on a wooden mast, carved and pointed at the end to act as a lance in battle. It is currently stored at the National Historical Museum of Athens.

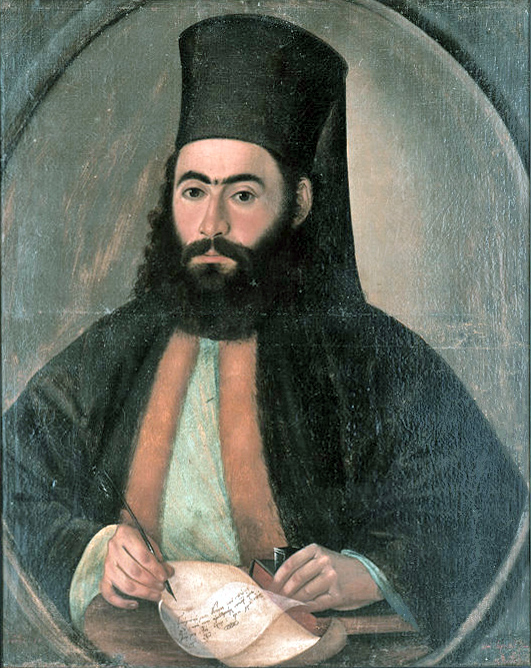
Painting of the Archbishop Kyprianos of Cyprus

Throughout the War of Independence, supplies were brought from Cyprus by the Filiki Etairia to aid the Greek struggle. The Greeks of Cyprus underwent great risk to provide these supplies, and secretly load them onto boats arriving at intervals from Greece, as the Ottoman rulers in Cyprus at the time were very wary of Cypriot insurgency and sentenced to death any Greek Cypriots found aiding the Greek cause. Incidences of these secret loading trips from Cyprus were recorded by the French consul to Cyprus, Mechain.

Back in Cyprus during the war, the local population suffered greatly at the hands of the Ottoman rulers of the islands, who were quick to act with great severity at any act of patriotism and sympathy of the Greeks of Cyprus to the Revolution, fearing a similar uprising in Cyprus. The religious leader of the Greeks of the island at the time, Archbishop Kyprianos was initiated into the Filiki Etairia in 1818 and had promised to aid the cause of the Greek Helladites with food and money.

In early July 1821, the Cypriot Archimandrite Theofylaktos Thiseas arrived in Larnaca as a messenger of the Filiki Etairia, bringing orders to Kyprianos, while proclamations were distributed in every corner of the island. However, the local pasha, Küçük Pasha, intercepted these messages and reacted with fury, calling in reinforcements, confiscating weapons and arresting several prominent Cypriots. Archbishop Kyprianos was urged (by his friends) to leave the island as the situation worsened, but refused to do so.

On 9 July 1821, Pasha had the gates to the walled city of Nicosia closed and executed, by beheading or hanging, 470 important Cypriots amongst them Chrysanthos (bishop of Paphos), Meletios (bishop of Kition) and Lavrentios (bishop of Kyrenia). The next day, all abbots and monks of monasteries in Cyprus were executed. In addition, the Ottomans arrested all the Greek leaders of the villages and imprisoned them before executing them, as they were suspected of inspiring patriotism in their local population.

In total, it is estimated that over 2,000 Greeks of Cyprus were slaughtered as an act of revenge for participating in the revolution. This was a very significant proportion of the total population of the island at the time. Küçük pasha had declared "I have in my mind to slaughter the Greeks in Cyprus, to hang them, to not leave a soul..." before undertaking these massacres. From 9 to 14 July, the Ottomans killed all prisoners on the list of the pasha, and in the next 30 days, looting and massacres spread throughout Cyprus as 4,000 Turkish soldiers from Syria arrived on the island.

Archbishop Kyprianos was defiant in his death. He was aware of his fate and impending death, yet stood by the Greek cause. He is revered throughout Cyprus as a noble patriot and defender of the Orthodox faith and Hellenic cause. An English explorer by the name of Carne spoke to the Archbishop before the events of 9 July, who was quoted as saying: "My death is not far away. I know they [the Ottoman] are waiting for an opportunity to kill me". Kyprianos chose to stay, despite these fears, and provide protection and counsel for the people of Cyprus as their leader.

He was publicly hanged from a tree opposite the former palace of the Lusignan Kings of Cyprus on 19 July 1821. The events leading up to his execution were documented in an epic poem written in the Cypriot dialect by Vassilis Michaelides.

==== War at sea ====
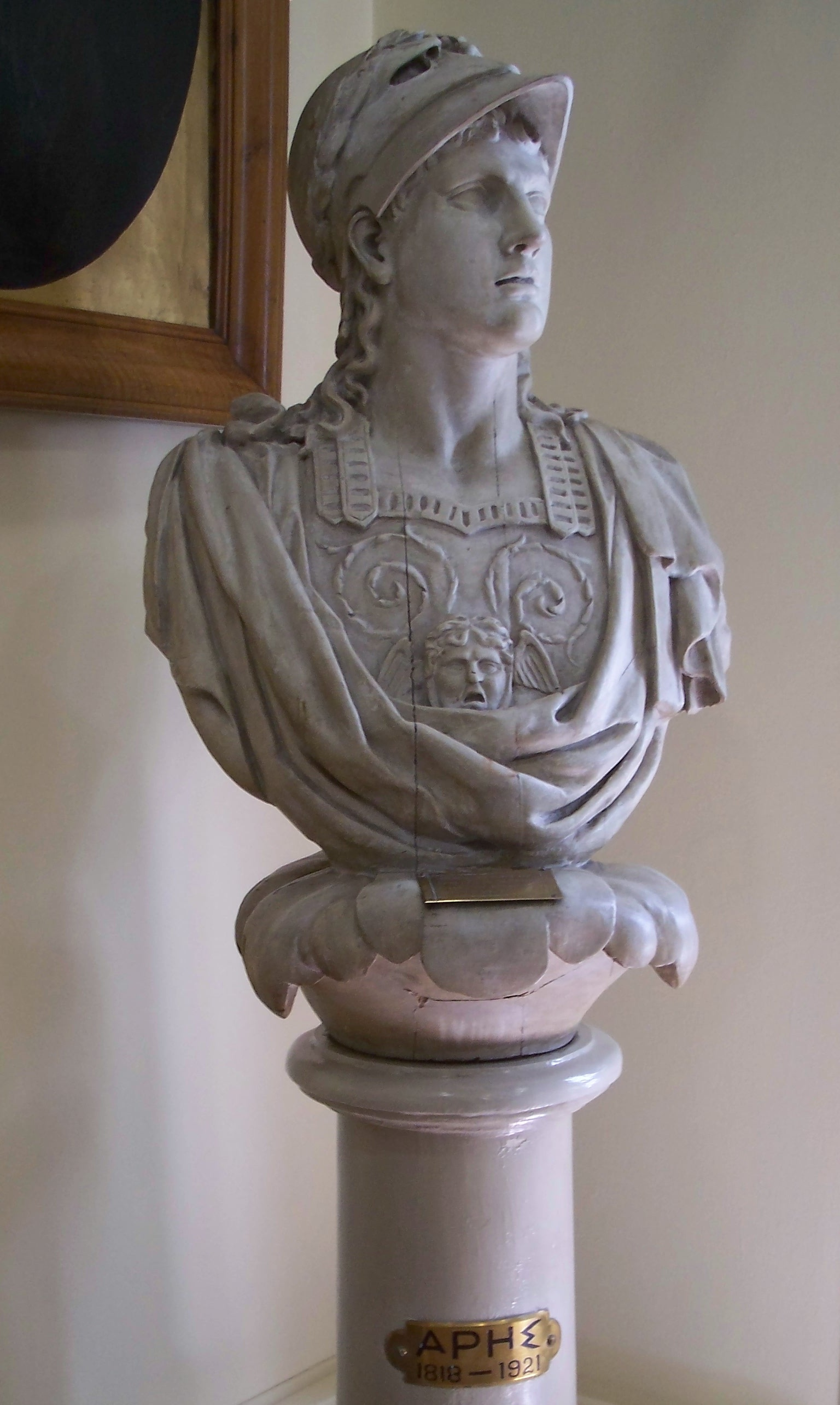
The figurehead of Anastasios Tsamados' famous brig Aris, today in the National Historical Museum, Athens.

From the early stages of the revolution, success at sea was vital for the Greeks. When they failed to counter the Ottoman Navy, it was able to resupply the isolated Ottoman garrisons and land reinforcements from the Ottoman Empire's provinces, threatening to crush the rebellion; likewise the failure of the Greek fleet to break the naval blockade of Messolonghi (as it did several times earlier) in 1826 led to the fall of the city.

The Greek fleet was primarily outfitted by prosperous Aegean islanders, principally from the islands of Hydra and Spetses, as well as from Psara. The Albanian-speaking seamen of Hydra and Spetses provided the core of the Greek fleet and leading members of the Greek government, among them a one wartime president. They in some cases used Albanian with each other to prevent others on their side from reading their correspondence. Each island equipped, manned and maintained its own squadron, under its own admiral. Although they were manned by experienced crews, the Greek ships were not designed for warfare, being armed merchantmen equipped with only light guns. Against them stood the Ottoman fleet, which enjoyed several advantages: its ships and supporting craft were built for war; it was supported by the resources of the vast Ottoman Empire; command was centralized and disciplined under the Kapudan Pasha. The total Ottoman fleet size consisted of 20 three-masted ships of the line, each with about 80 guns and 7 or 8 frigates with 50 guns, 5 corvettes with about 30 guns and around 40 brigs with 20 or fewer guns, complemented by squadrons from the Maghrebi vassal states (Algiers, Tripoli and Tunis) and Egypt.

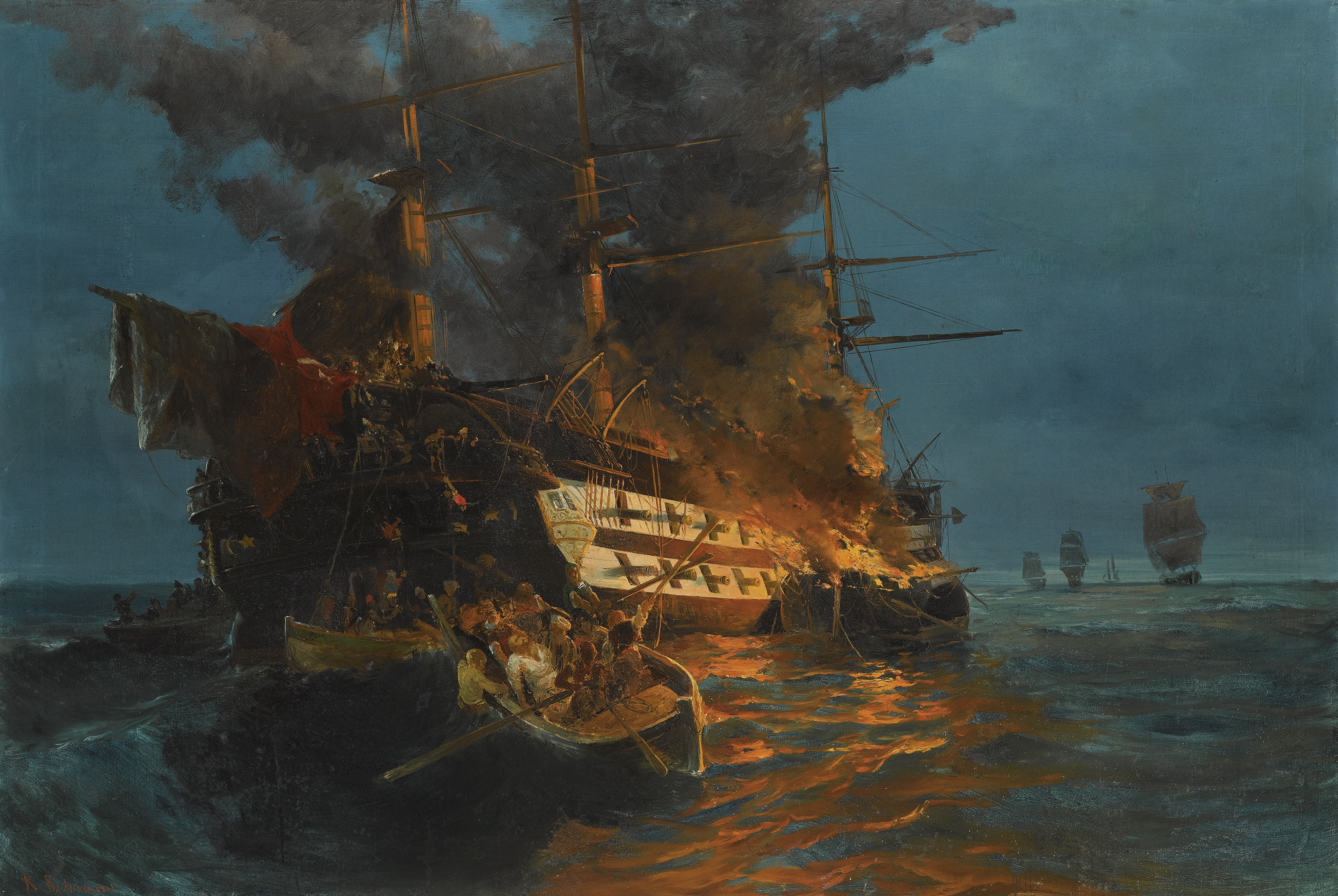
"The burning of the Ottoman frigate at Eressos by Dimitrios Papanikolis" by Konstantinos Volanakis

In the face of this situation, the Greeks decided to use fire ships (Greek: πυρπολικά or μπουρλότα), which had proven themselves effective for the Psarians during the Orlov Revolt in 1770. The first test was made at Eresos on 27 May 1821, when an Ottoman frigate was successfully destroyed by a fire ship under Dimitrios Papanikolis. In the fire ships, the Greeks found an effective weapon against the Ottoman vessels. In subsequent years, the successes of the Greek fire ships would increase their reputation, with acts such as the destruction of the Ottoman flagship by Konstantinos Kanaris at Chios, after the massacre of the island's population in June 1822, acquiring international fame.

At the same time, conventional naval actions were also fought, at which naval commanders like Andreas Miaoulis distinguished themselves. The early successes of the Greek fleet in direct confrontations with the Ottomans at Patras and Spetses gave the crews confidence and contributed greatly to the survival and success of the uprising in the Peloponnese.

Later, however, as Greece became embroiled in a civil war, the Sultan called upon his strongest subject, Muhammad Ali of Egypt, for aid. Plagued by internal strife and financial difficulties in keeping the fleet in constant readiness, the Greeks failed to prevent the capture and destruction of Kasos and Psara in 1824, or the landing of the Egyptian army at Methoni. Despite victories at Samos and Gerontas, the Revolution was threatened with collapse until the intervention of the Great Powers in the Battle of Navarino in 1827.

=== 1822–1824 ===
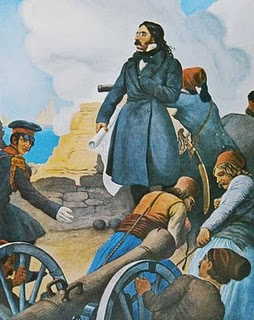
"Alexandros Mavrokordatos, president of the Executive, defends Missolonghi" by Peter von Hess.

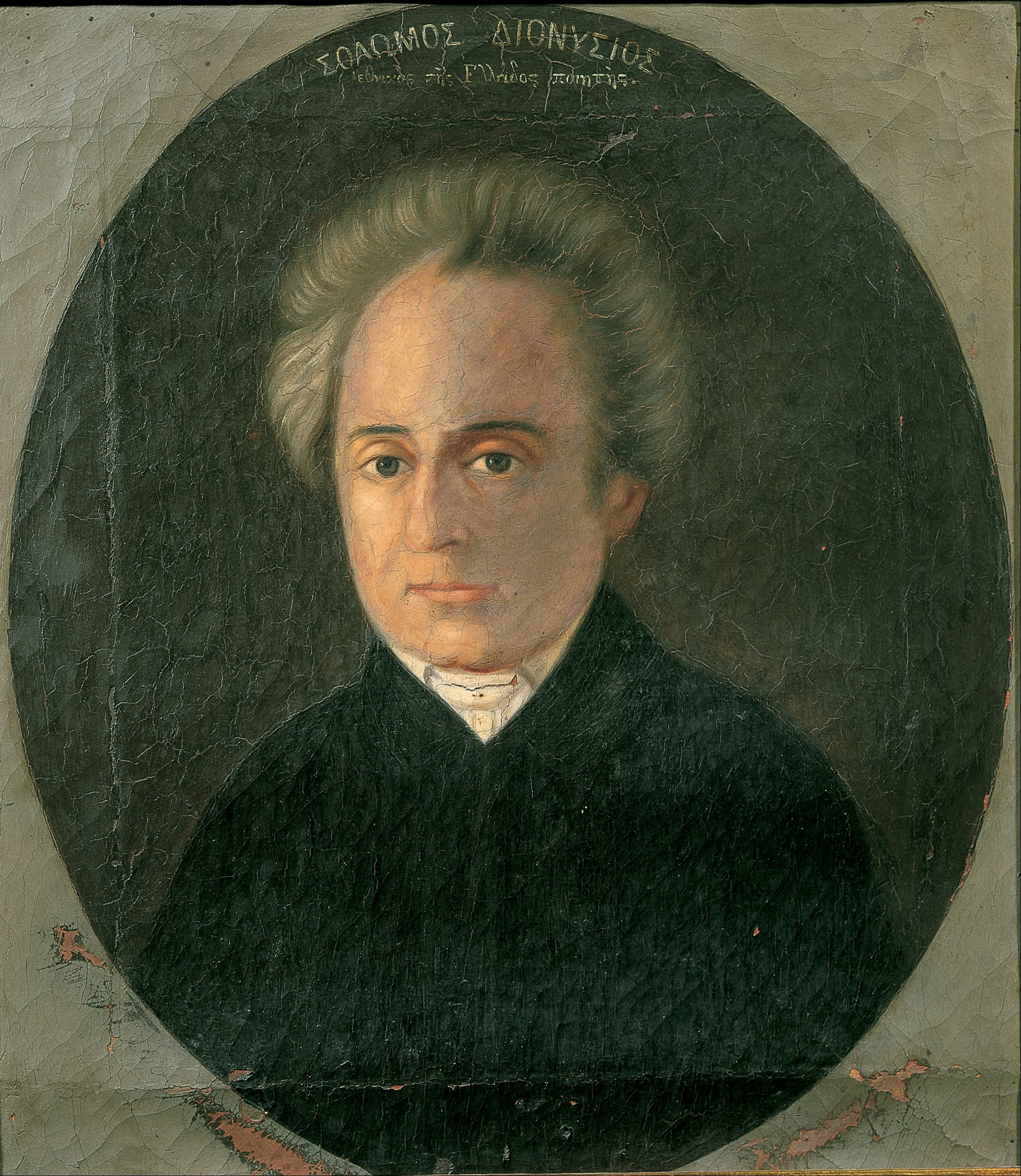
Dionysios Solomos wrote the Hymn to Liberty, which later became the National Greek anthem, in 1823.

Revolutionary activity was fragmented because of the lack of strong central leadership and guidance. However, the Greek side withstood the Turkish attacks because the Ottoman military campaigns were periodic and the Ottoman presence in the rebel areas was uncoordinated due to logistical problems. The cash-strapped Ottoman state's relations with Russia, always difficult, had been made worse by the hanging of Patriarch Grigorios, and the Sublime Porte needed to concentrate substantial forces on the Russian border in case war broke out.

From October 1820 to July 1823, the Ottomans were at war with Persia, and in March 1823 a huge fire at the Tophana military arsenal in Constantinople destroyed much of the Ottoman state's supplies of ammunition and its main cannon foundry. Short of men and money, the Ottoman state turned to hiring Albanian tribesmen to fight the Greeks, and by 1823, the bulk of the Ottoman forces in Greece were Albanian mercenaries hired for a campaigning season rather than the Ottoman Army. The Albanian tribesmen, whose style of war was very similar to the Greeks, fought only for money and were liable to go home when not paid or able to plunder in lieu of pay. The Greek military leaders preferred battlefields where they could annihilate the numerical superiority of the opponent, and, at the same time, the lack of artillery hampered Ottoman military efforts.

On 11 April 1822, the Ottoman fleet, under the Kapitan Pasha, Kara Ali, arrived on the island of Chios. The Ottoman sailors and soldiers promptly went on a rampage, killing and raping without mercy, as one contemporary recalled: "Mercy was out of the question, the victors butchering indiscriminately all who came in their way; shrieks rent the air, and the streets were strewn with the dead bodies of old men, women, and children; even the inmates of the hospital, the madhouse and deaf and dumb institution, were inhumanely slaughtered". Before Kara Ali's fleet had arrived, Chios had between 100,000 and 120,000 Greeks living there, of which some 25,000 were killed in the massacre, with another 45,000 (mostly women and children) sold into slavery.

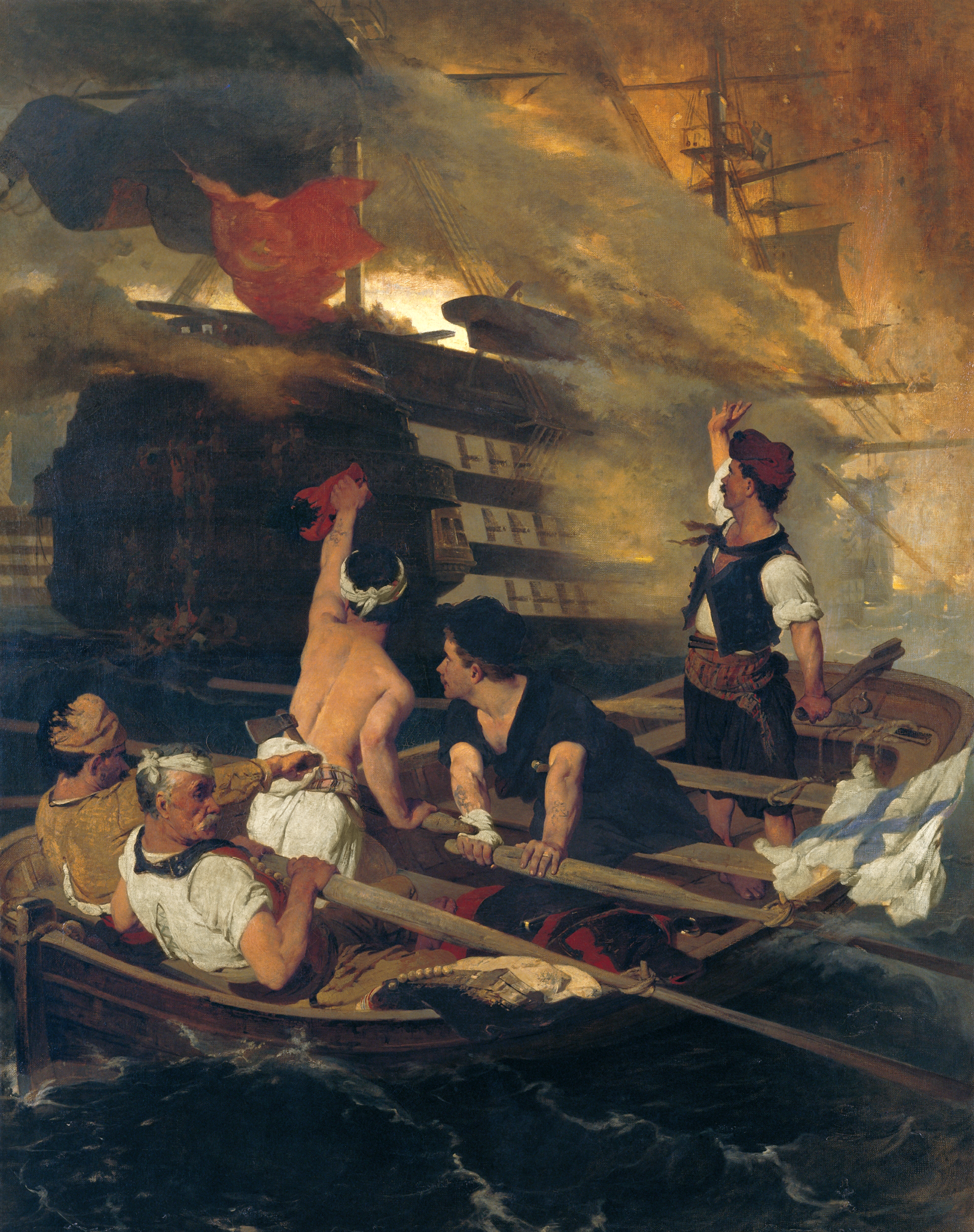
"The burning of the Turkish flagship by Kanaris" by Nikiforos Lytras.

The Chios massacre shocked all of Europe and further increased public sympathy for the Greek cause. The Greeks avenged the massacre on the night of 18 June 1822, when the Ottoman fleet were busy celebrating the end of the sacred Muslim holiday of Ramadan, which the Greek fleet under Admiral Konstantinos Kanaris and Andreas Pipinos took advantage of to launch a fire ship attack. As Kara Ali's ship was brightly lit as befitting the Kapitan Pasha, a fire ship under Kanaris was able to strike his ship, causing the Ottoman flagship to blow up. Of the 2,286 or so aboard the flagship, only 180 survived, but many of the dead were Chians enslaved by Kara Ali, who was planning on selling them on the slave markets when he reached Constantinople.

In July 1822, the Greeks and philhellenes at the Battle of Peta under Alexandros Mavrokordatos inflicted much punishment on an Ottoman army commanded by Omer Vrioni, but reflecting the chronic factionalism and disunity that characterized the Greek war effort, were undone when one of the Greek captains, Gogos Bakolas betrayed his own side to the Ottomans, allowing Albanian infantry to advance up the ridge. The battle ended in an Ottoman victory, and with most of the philhellenes killed. The successive military campaigns of the Ottomans in Western and Eastern Greece were repulsed: in 1822, Ottoman Albanian Mahmud Dramali Pasha crossed Roumeli and invaded Morea, but suffered a serious defeat in the Dervenakia. Theodoros Kolokotronis, who annihilated Dramali Pasha's army at Dervenakia, became the hero of the hour, attracting much praise all over Greece.

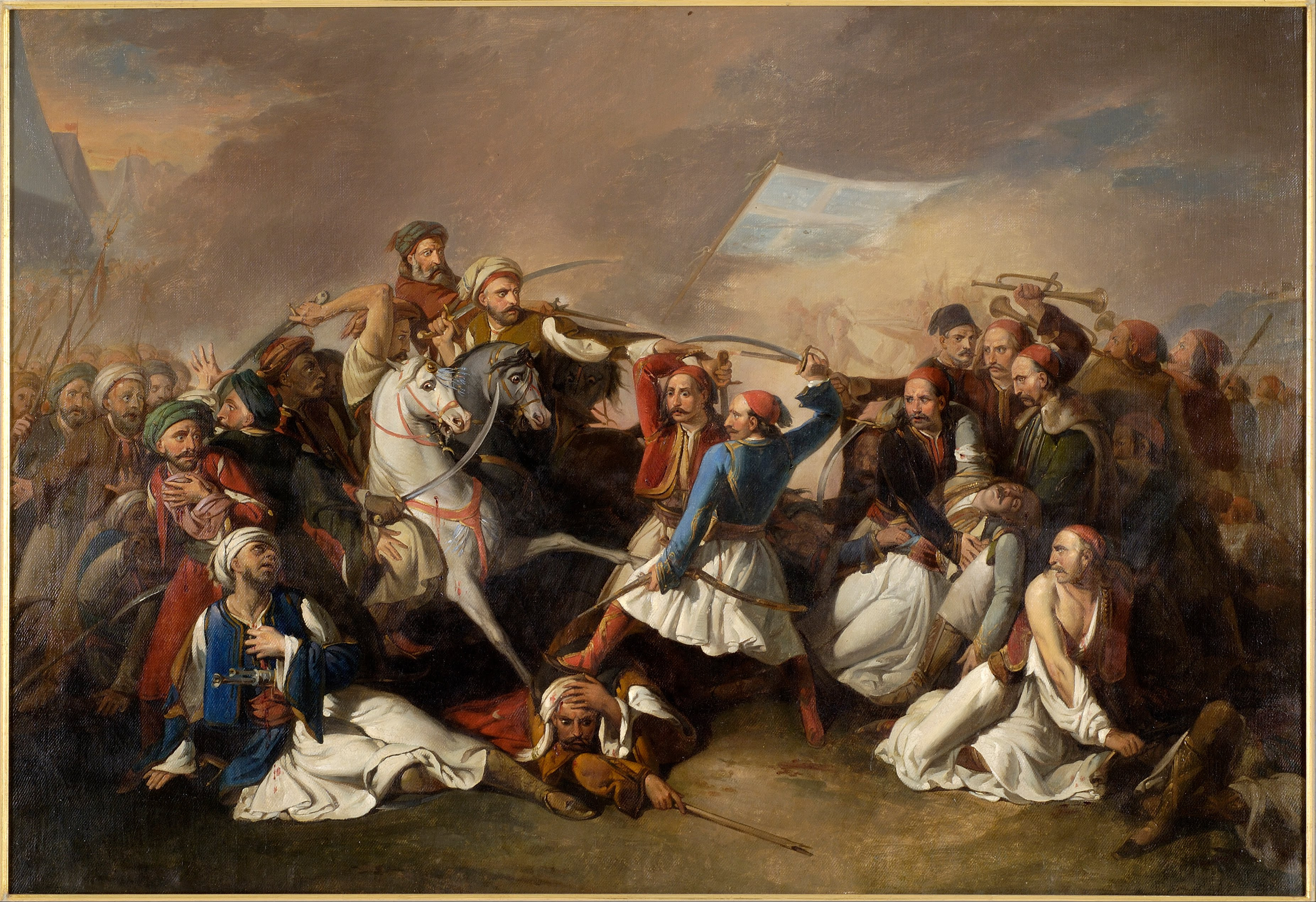
"The death of Markos Botsaris during the Battle of Karpenisi" by Marsigli Filippo.

The Greek government had been desperately short of money since the start of the revolution, and in February 1823, the banker Andréas Louriótis arrived in London, seeking a loan from the city. Assisted by the London Greek Committee, which included several MPs and intellectuals, Louriótis began to lobby the city for a loan. British philhellene Edward Blaquiere issued a report in September 1823 which grossly exaggerated Greece's economic prosperity and claimed that once independent, Greece would easily become "one of the most opulent nations of Europe". Blaquiere further assisted the campaign by publishing two books in 1824, in which he claimed: "I should have no hesitation whatever in estimating the physical strength of regenerated Greece to be fully equal to the whole South American continent", concluding there was "no part of the world...with a more productive soil or happier climate than Greece...Of all the countries or governments who have borrowed money in London within the last ten years...Greece possesses the surest and most ample means of re-payment".

The 1823 campaign in Western Greece was led by Northern Albanian forces under Mustafa Reshit Pasha from the Pashalik of Scutari, and Southern Albanian forces under Omer Vrioni from the former Pashalik of Yanina. During the summer the Souliot Markos Botsaris was shot dead at the Battle of Karpenisi in his attempt to stop the advance of Ottoman Albanian forces; the announcement of his death in Europe generated a wave of sympathy for the Greek cause. The campaign ended after the Second Siege of Missolonghi in December 1823. In February 1824, the loan for Greece was floated in the city, attracting some £472, 000 pounds sterling (~$17.4 million in 2021), which was money that the Greeks badly needed.

=== Revolution in peril and infighting ===
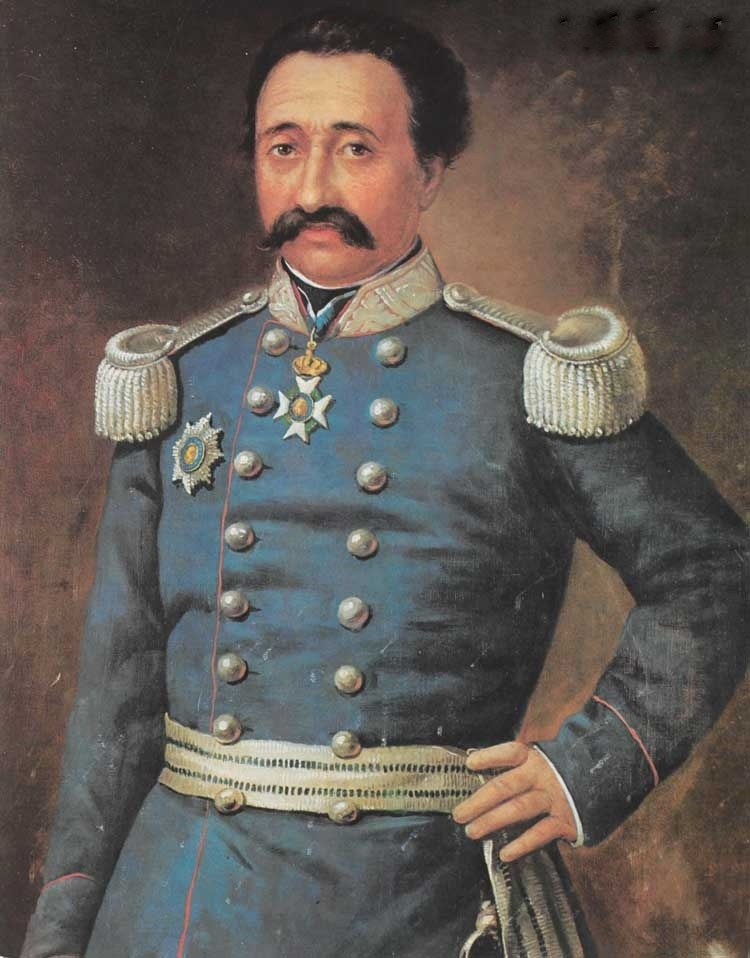
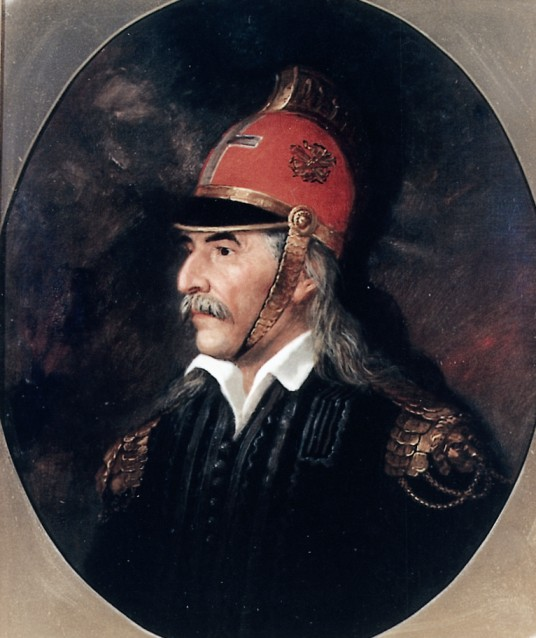
Andreas Londos (left) and Theodoros Kolokotronis (right) were opponents during the first civil war, when the Peloponnesians were divided. They allied themselves during the second and bloodiest phase of the infighting.

The First National Assembly was formed at Epidaurus in late December 1821, consisting almost exclusively of Peloponnesian notables. The Assembly drafted the first Greek Constitution and appointed the members of an executive and a legislative body that were to govern the liberated territories. Mavrokordatos saved the office of president of the executive for himself, while Ypsilantis, who had called for the Assembly, was elected president of the legislative body, a place of limited significance.

Military leaders and representatives of Filiki Eteria were marginalized, but gradually Kolokotronis' political influence grew, and he soon managed to control, along with the captains he influenced, the Peloponnesian Senate. The central administration tried to marginalize Kolokotronis, who also had under his control the fort of Nafplion. In November 1822, the central administration decided that the new National Assembly would take place in Nafplion, and asked Kolokotronis to return the fort to the government. Kolokotronis refused, and the Assembly was finally gathered in March 1823 in Astros. Central governance was strengthened at the expense of regional bodies, a new constitution was voted, and new members were elected for the executive and the legislative bodies.

Trying to coax the military leaders, the central administration proposed to Kolokotronis that he participate in the executive body as vice-president. Kolokotronis accepted, but he caused a serious crisis when he prevented Mavrokordatos, who had been elected president of the legislative body, from assuming his position. His attitude towards Mavrokordatos caused outrage amongst the members of the legislative body.

The crisis culminated when the legislature, which was controlled by the Roumeliotes and the Hydriots, overturned the executive, and fired its president, Petros Mavromichalis. Kolokotronis and most of the Peloponnesian notables and captains supported Mavromichalis, who remained president of his executive in Tripolitsa. However, a second executive, supported by the islanders, the Roumeliotes, and some Achaean notables—Andreas Zaimis and Andreas Londos were the most prominent—was formed at Kranidi with Kountouriotis as president.

In March 1824, the forces of the new executive besieged Nafplion and Tripolitsa. After one month of fighting and negotiations, an agreement was reached between Kolokotronis, from one side, and Londos and Zaimis, from the other side. On 22 May, the first phase of the civil war officially ended, but most of the members of the new executive were displeased by the moderate terms of the agreement that Londos and Zaimis brokered.

During this period, the two first installments of the English loan had arrived, and the position of the government was strengthened; but the infighting was not yet over. Zaimis and the other Peloponnesians who supported Kountouriotis came into conflict with the executive body, and allied with Kolokotronis, who roused the residents of Tripolitsa against the local tax collectors of the government. Papaflessas and Makriyannis failed to suppress the rebellion, but Kolokotronis remained inactive for some period, overwhelmed by the death of his son, Panos.

The government regrouped its armies, which now consisted mainly of Roumeliotes and Souliotes, led by Ioannis Kolettis, who wanted a complete victory. Under Kolettis' orders, two bodies of Roumeliotes and Souliotes invaded the Peloponnese: the first under Gouras occupied Corinth and raided the province; the second under Karaiskakis, Kitsos Tzavelas and others, attacked in Achaea, Lindos and "Zaimis". In January 1825, a Roumeliote force, led by Kolettis himself, arrested Kolokotronis, Deligiannis' family and others. In May 1825, under the pressure of the Egyptian intervention, those imprisoned were released and granted amnesty.

=== Egyptian intervention ===
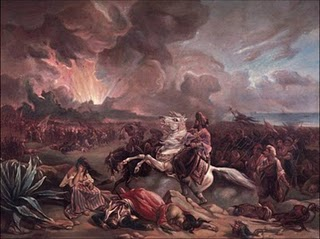
Ibrahim attacks Missolonghi by Giuseppe Pietro Mazzola

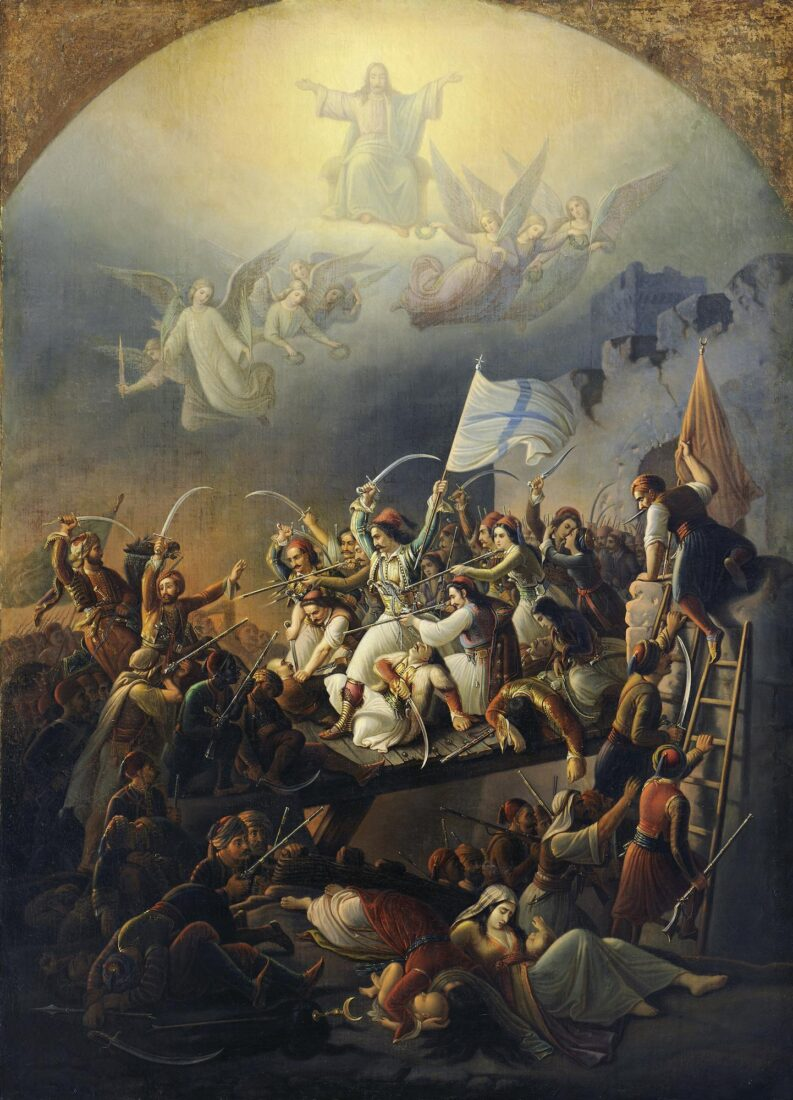
The sortie of Missolonghi by Theodoros Vryzakis (1855, oil on canvas, National Gallery of Athens).

On 19 July 1824, the largest fleet seen in the Mediterranean since Napoleon invaded Egypt in 1798 set sail from Alexandria, consisting of 54 warships and 400 transports carrying 14,000 French-trained infantry, 2,000 cavalry and 500 artillerymen, with some 150 cannons. Egyptian intervention was initially limited to Crete and Cyprus. However, the success of Muhammad Ali's troops in both places settled the Turks on the horns of a very difficult dilemma, since they were afraid of their wāli's expansionist ambitions. Muhammad Ali finally agreed to send his son Ibrahim Pasha to Greece in exchange not only for Crete and Cyprus, but for the Peloponnese and Syria as well.

On 7 February 1825, a second loan to Greece was floated in the City of London. Although the Greek government had squandered the money from the first loan, the second loan was oversubscribed and raised some £1.1 million (~$404 million in 2021). Unlike the first loan, the second loan from the city was to be managed by a Board of Control in London, consisting of the banker Samson Ricardo, two MPs, Edward Ellice and Sir Francis Burdett and John Cam Hobhouse of the London Greek Committee, who were to use the money to buy warships and other supplies, which would then be handed over to the Greeks. After the Greek government had wasted most of the money from the first loan, the City did not trust them to spend the money from the second loan wisely. The Board of Control used the money to hire the naval hero, Lord Cochrane, to command the Greek Navy and to buy steamships. One of the British philhellenes, Frank Abney Hastings believed that the use of mechanised warships powered by steam and using red-hot shot would allow the Greeks to overpower the Ottoman navy, powered as it was by sail. Hastings persuaded the Board of Control to invest in the revolutionary technology of the steamship, making the first use of a mechanised warship in a war. The two loans from the City caused significant financial difficulties for the young nation, and in 1878 a deal was struck between the creditors and the Greek government to reduce the loans, now worth £10 million, with unpaid interest down to 1.5 million pounds sterling.

Ibrahim Pasha landed at Methoni on 24 February 1825, and a month later he was joined by his army of 10,000 infantry and 1,000 cavalry. The Greeks had not expected Ibrahim Pasha to land during the stormy winter weather, and were taken by surprise. The Greeks initially laughed at the Egyptian soldiers, who were short, skinny fallāḥīn (peasant) conscripts, many of them blind in one eye owing to the prevalence of parasitic worms that attacked the eye in the Nile, wearing cheap red uniforms comprising a jacket, trousers and a skull-cap. However, the Greeks soon learned that the Egyptians, who were trained by French officers recruited by Mohammed Ali, were tough and hardy soldiers who, unlike the Turkish and Albanian units that the Greeks had been fighting until then, stood their ground in combat. Ibrahim proceeded to defeat the Greek garrison on the small island of Sphacteria off the coast of Messenia. With the Greeks in disarray, Ibrahim ravaged the Western Peloponnese and killed Papaflessas at the Battle of Maniaki. To try to stop Ibrahim, Kanaris led the raid on Alexandria, an attempt to destroy the Egyptian fleet that failed due to a sudden change of the wind. The British traveller and Church of England minister, Reverend Charles Swan, reported Ibrahim Pasha as saying to him that he "would burn and destroy the whole Morea".

Popular opinion in both Greece and the rest of Europe, soon credited Ibrahim Pasha with the so-called "barbarisation project", where it was alleged that Ibrahim planned to deport the entire Christian Greek population to Egypt as slaves and replace them with Egyptian peasants. It is not clear even today if the "barbarisation project" was a real plan or not, but the possibility that it was created strong demands for humanitarian intervention in Europe. The Porte and Mohammed Ali both denied having plans for the "barbarisation project", but pointedly refused to put their denials into writing.

Russia warned that if the "barbarisation project" was a real plan, then such an egregious violation of the Treaty of Küçük Kaynarca, under which Russia had a vague claim to be the protector of all the Orthodox peoples of the Ottoman Empire, would lead to Russia going to war against the Ottomans. In turn, the British Foreign Secretary George Canning wrote, rather than run the risk of Russia defeating the Ottomans alone, Britain would have to intervene to stop the "barbarisation project" as the British did not wish to see the Russians conquer the Ottoman Empire.

While diplomats and statesmen debated what to do in London and St. Petersburg, the Egyptian advance continued in Greece. The Greek government, in an attempt to stop the Egyptians, released Kolokotronis from captivity, but he too was unsuccessful. By the end of June, Ibrahim had captured the city of Argos and was within striking distance of Nafplion. The city was saved by Makriyannis and Dimitrios Ypsilantis who successfully defended Myloi at the outskirts of Nafplion, making the mills outside the town a fortress causing damage to Ibrahim's far superior forces who were unable to take the position and eventually left for Tripolitsa. Makriyannis was wounded and was taken aboard by Europeans who were overseeing the battle. Among them was De Rigny, who had an argument with Makriyannis and advised him to quit his weak position but Makriyannis ignored him. Commodore Gawen Hamilton of the Royal Navy, placed his ships in a position which looked like he would assist in the defense of the city.

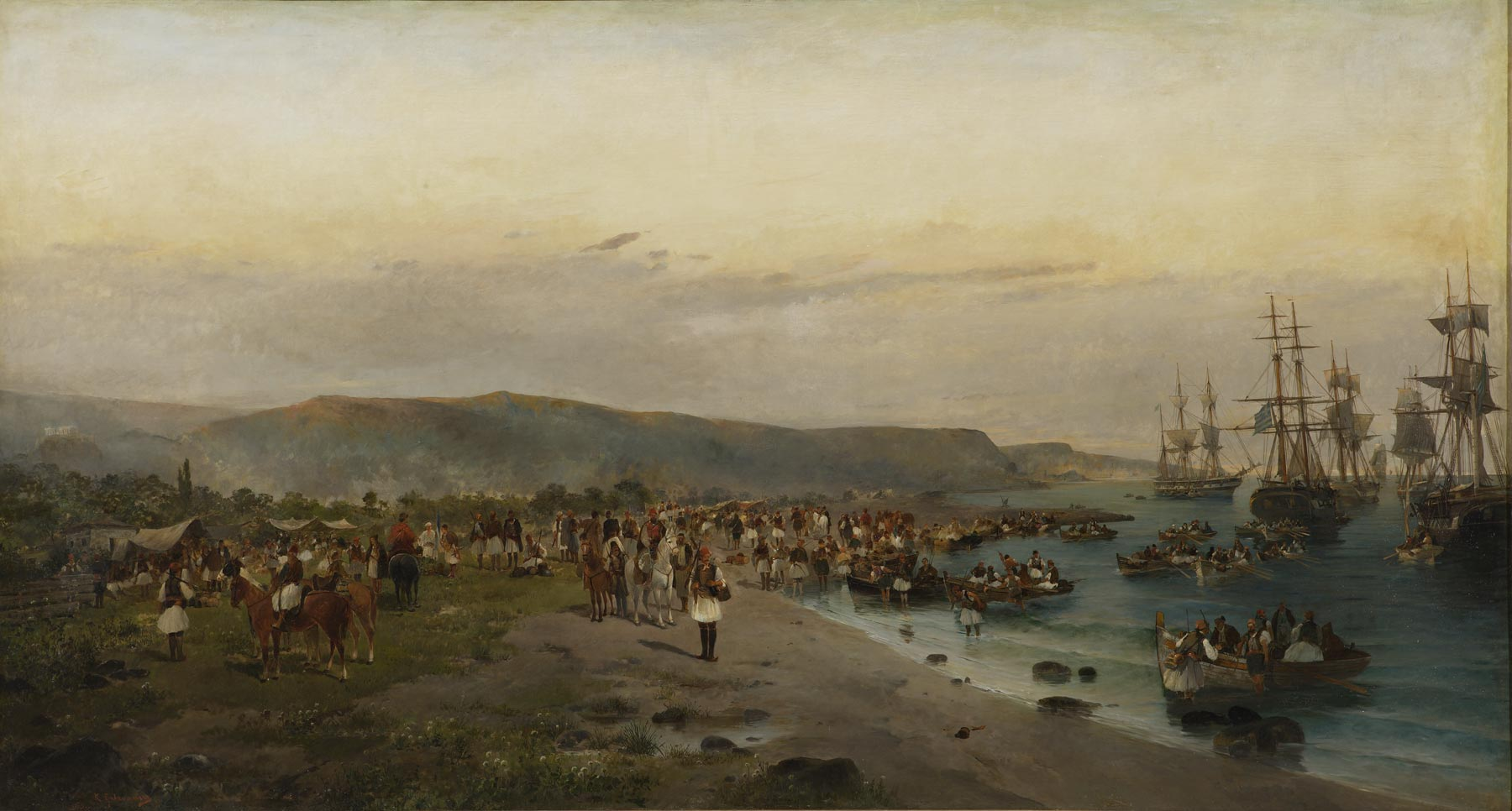
"Karaiskakis landing at Phaliro" by Konstantinos Volanakis

At the same time, the Turkish armies in Central Greece were besieging the city of Missolonghi for the third time. The siege had begun on 15 April 1825, the day on which Navarino had fallen to Ibrahim. In early autumn, the Greek navy, under the command of Miaoulis forced the Turkish fleet in the Gulf of Corinth to retreat, after attacking it with fire ships. The Turks were joined by Ibrahim in mid-winter, but his army had no more luck in penetrating Missolonghi's defences.

In the spring of 1826, Ibrahim managed to capture the marshes around the city, although not without heavy losses. He thus cut the Greeks off from the sea and blocked off their supply route. Although the Egyptians and the Turks offered them terms to stop the attacks, the Greeks refused, and continued to fight. On 22 April, the Greeks decided to sail from the city during the night, with 3,000 men, to cut a path through the Egyptian lines and allow 6,000 women, children and non-combatants to follow. However, a Bulgarian deserter informed Ibrahim of the Greeks' intention, and he had his entire army deployed; only 1,800 Greeks managed to cut their way through the Egyptian lines. Between 3,000 and 4,000 women and children were enslaved and many of the people who remained behind decided to blow themselves up with gunpowder rather than be enslaved.

The news that the Third Siege of Missolonghi had ended in an Ottoman victory sparked horror all over Greece; at the National Assembly, Kolokotronis was giving a speech when the news of Missolonghi's fall reached him, leaving him to remember: "the news came to us that Missolonghi was lost. We were all plunged into great grief; for half an hour there was so complete a silence that no one would have thought there was a living soul present; each of us was revolving in his mind how great was our misfortune". The American philhellene Samuel Gridley Howe, serving as a doctor with the Greeks, wrote back to America: "I write you with an almost breaking heart. Missolonghi has fallen!", which he called "damning proof of the selfish indifference of the Christian world. You may talk to me of national policy and the necessity of neutrality, but I say, a curse upon such a policy!".

The news of Missolonghi's fall had a huge impact on the rest of Europe, sparking a vast outpouring of songs, poems, essays, sermons and plays in Britain, France, Germany and Switzerland, with the recurring image of Missolonghi's fall being the murder of a sweet and innocent young Greek woman at the hands of the Turks as a symbol of the unwillingness of the Christian powers of the world to do anything for the Greeks. In May 1826, Hastings arrived in Greece with a British-built steamship, the Karteria (Perseverance), which astonished the Greeks to see a ship powered by steam and did not move either via sail or oars. The Karteria suffered from constant engine breakdowns, but Hastings was able to use the ship successfully twice over the course of the next two years, at Volos and in the Gulf of Corinth.

Ibrahim sent an envoy to the Maniots demanding that they surrender or else he would ravage their land as he had done to the rest of the Peloponnese. Instead of surrendering, the Maniots simply replied:

From the few Greeks of Mani and the rest of the Greeks who live there to Ibrahim Pasha. We received your letter in which you try to frighten us, saying that if we don't surrender, you'll kill the Maniots and plunder Mani. That's why we are waiting for you and your army. We, the inhabitants of Mani, sign and wait for you.

Ibrahim tried to enter Mani from the north-east near Almiro on 21 June 1826, but he was forced to stop at the fortifications at Vergas in northern Mani. His army of 7,000 men was held off by an army of 2,000 Maniots and 500 refugees from other parts of Greece until Kolokotronis attacked the Egyptians from the rear and forced them to retreat. The Maniots pursued the Egyptians all the way to Kalamata before returning to Vergas. Simultaneously, Ibrahim sent his fleet further down the Maniot coast in order to outflank the Greek defenders and attack them from the rear. However, when his force landed at Pyrgos Dirou, they were confronted by a group of Maniot women and repelled. Ibrahim again attempted to enter Mani from central Laconia, but again the Maniots defeated the Turkish and Egyptian forces at Polytsaravo. The Maniot victory dealt the death blow to Ibrahim's hope of occupying Mani.

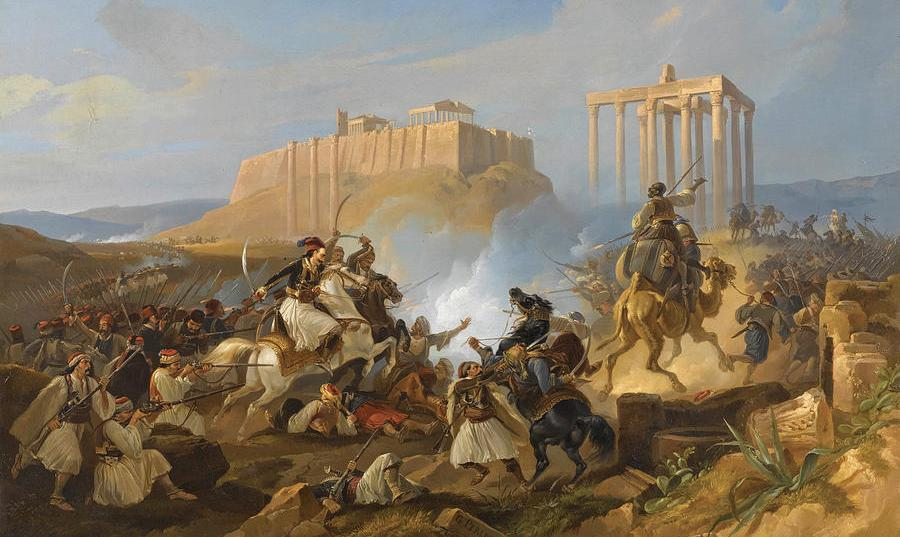
The Siege of the Acropolis

The losses Ibrahim Pasha had taken at Missolonghi had greatly reduced his army, and he spent the rest of 1826 chasing the Greek guerillas up and down the mountains. In late June 1826, Reshid Pasha had arrived outside of Athens and laid siege to the city, marking the beginning of the siege of the Acropolis. By the middle of August, only the Acropolis still held out under Yannis Gouras. To break the siege, an attack was launched on Reshid Pasha on 18 August 1826 led by the guerrilla leader Georgios Karaiskakis and the French philhellene Colonel Charles Nicolas Fabvier but were driven off with the loss of some 300 dead. On 13 October 1826, Gouras was killed by an Ottoman sniper and a week later, Yannis Makriyannis was wounded three times in a single day. In December, Febvier was able to infiltrate a force of some 500 men into the Akropolis, bringing in much needed supplies of gunpowder, through he was much offended when the garrison started firing to wake up the Turks, trapping him and his men.

In the summer of 1826, the Greek government gave command of its army to the British General Sir Richard Church. The British historian George Finlay wrote: "Church was of a small, well-made, active frame, and of a healthy constitution. His manner was agreeable and easy, with the polish of a great social experience, and the goodness of his disposition was admitted by his enemies, but the strength of his mind was not the quality of which his friends boasted...Both Church and the Greeks misunderstood one another. The Greeks expected Church to prove a Wellington, with a military chest well supplied from the British treasury. Church expected the irregulars of Greece to execute his strategy like regiments of guards". Church landed in Greece in March 1827, and was welcomed by his old friend Kolokotronis.

A week later, Lord Cochrane arrived to take command of the Greek Navy and refused to leave his yacht until the Greeks agreed to form a united government. On 31 March 1827, the Trizina Assembly began its work, drafting a new constitution and offered the presidency of Greece to the former Russian foreign minister, Count Ioannis Kapodistrias. In the meantime, the siege of Athens continued. On 5 February 1827, a force of 2,300 Greeks under the command of Colonel Thomas Gordon landed at Piraeus, and laid siege to the monastery of Saint Spyridon, held by Turkish and Albanian troops. In April 1827, Church and Cochrane arrived at Athens and immediately clashed over strategy. When the Ottoman garrison at Ayios Spiridhon surrendered, they were promised safe conduct, but as they were marching out, a shot went off and most of the Ottoman soldiers were killed. Cochrane insisted on a bold but risky plan to stage a night attack across the open plains to break the siege. An operation which launched on 5 May 1827 ended in disaster, as the Greek forces got lost and scattered as the captains quarreled with one another. This led to a devastating Ottoman cavalry charge in the morning, with Ottomans hunting the scattered Greek forces almost at leisure. On 5 June 1827, the Acropolis surrendered in the last Ottoman victory of the war.

Kapodistrias arrived in Greece to become the Governor on 28 January 1828. The first task of Greece's new leader was to create a state and a civil society, which the workaholic Kapodistrias toiled at mightily, working from 5 am until 10 pm every night. Kapodistrias alienated many with his haughty, high-handed manner and his open contempt for most of the Greek elite, but he attracted support from several of the captains, such as Theodoros Kolokotronis and Yannis Makriyannis who provided the necessary military force to back up Kapodistrias's decisions. As a former Russian foreign minister, Kapodistrias was well connected to the European elite and he attempted to use his connections to secure loans for the new Greek state and to achieve the most favorable borders for Greece, which was being debated by Russian, French and British diplomats.

=== Foreign intervention against the Ottomans ===
==== Initial hostility ====
When the news of the Greek Revolution was first received, the reaction of the European powers was uniformly hostile. They recognized the degeneration of the Ottoman Empire, but they did not know how to handle this situation (a problem known as the "Eastern Question"). Afraid of the complications the partition of the empire might raise, the British foreign minister Viscount Castlereagh, Austrian foreign minister Prince Metternich, and the Tsar of Russia Alexander I shared the same view concerning the necessity of preserving the status quo and the peace of Europe. They also pleaded that they maintain the Concert of Europe.

Metternich also tried to undermine the Russian foreign minister, Ioannis Kapodistrias, who was of Greek origin. Kapodistrias demanded that Alexander declare war on the Ottomans in order to liberate Greece and increase the greatness of Russia. Metternich persuaded Alexander that Kapodistrias was in league with the Italian Carbonari (an Italian revolutionary group), leading Alexander to disavow him. As a result of the Russian reaction to Alexander Ypsilantis, Kapodistrias resigned as foreign minister and moved to Switzerland.

Nevertheless, Alexander's position was ambivalent, since he regarded himself as the protector of the Orthodox Church, and his subjects were deeply moved by the hanging of the Patriarch. These factors explain why, after denouncing the Greek Revolution, Alexander dispatched an ultimatum to Constantinople on 27 July 1821, after the Greek massacres in the city and the hanging of the Patriarch.

However, the danger of war passed temporarily, after Metternich and Castlereagh persuaded the Sultan to make some concessions to the Tsar. On 14 December 1822, the Holy Alliance denounced the Greek Revolution, considering it audacious.

==== Change of stance ====
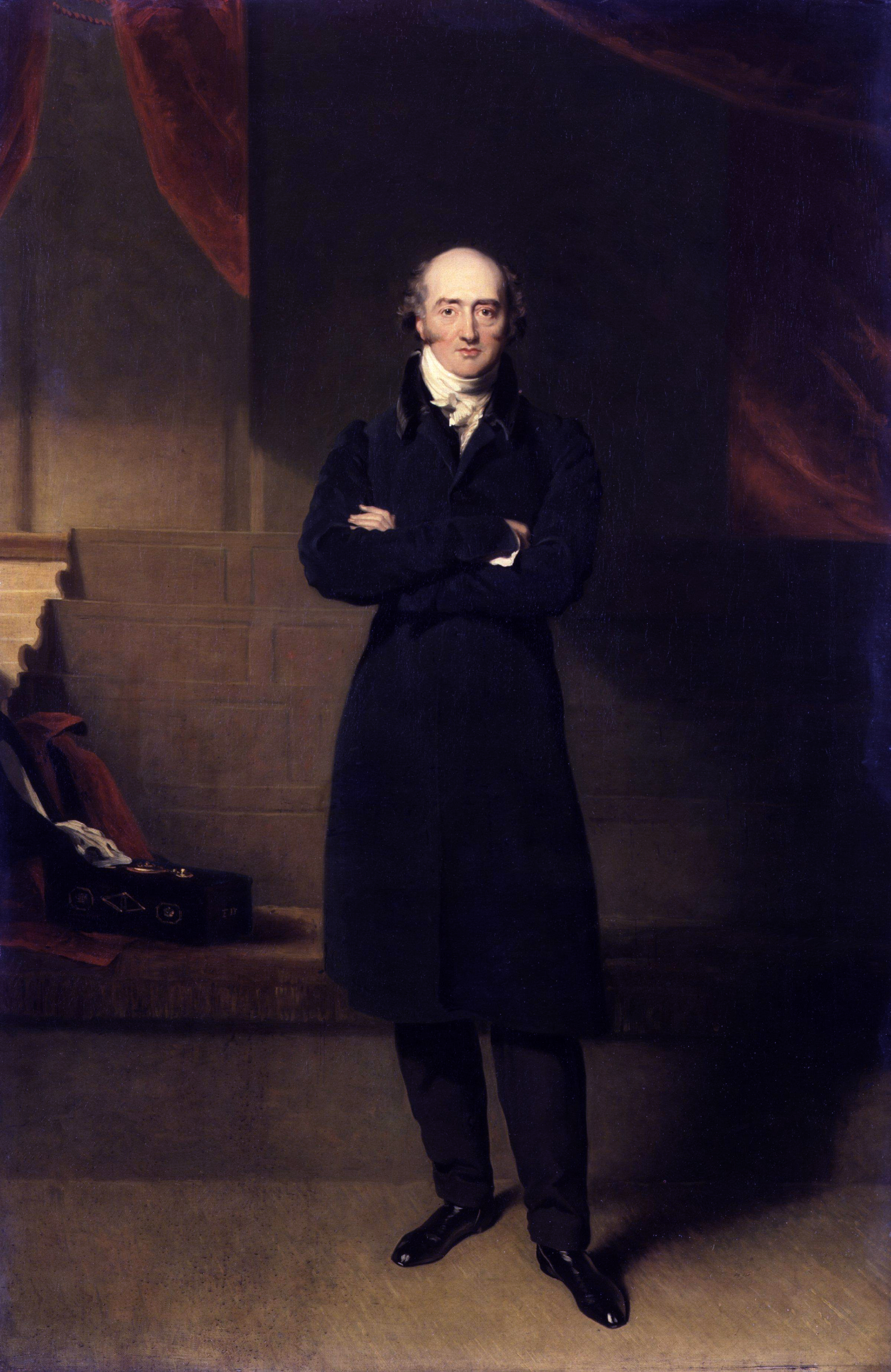
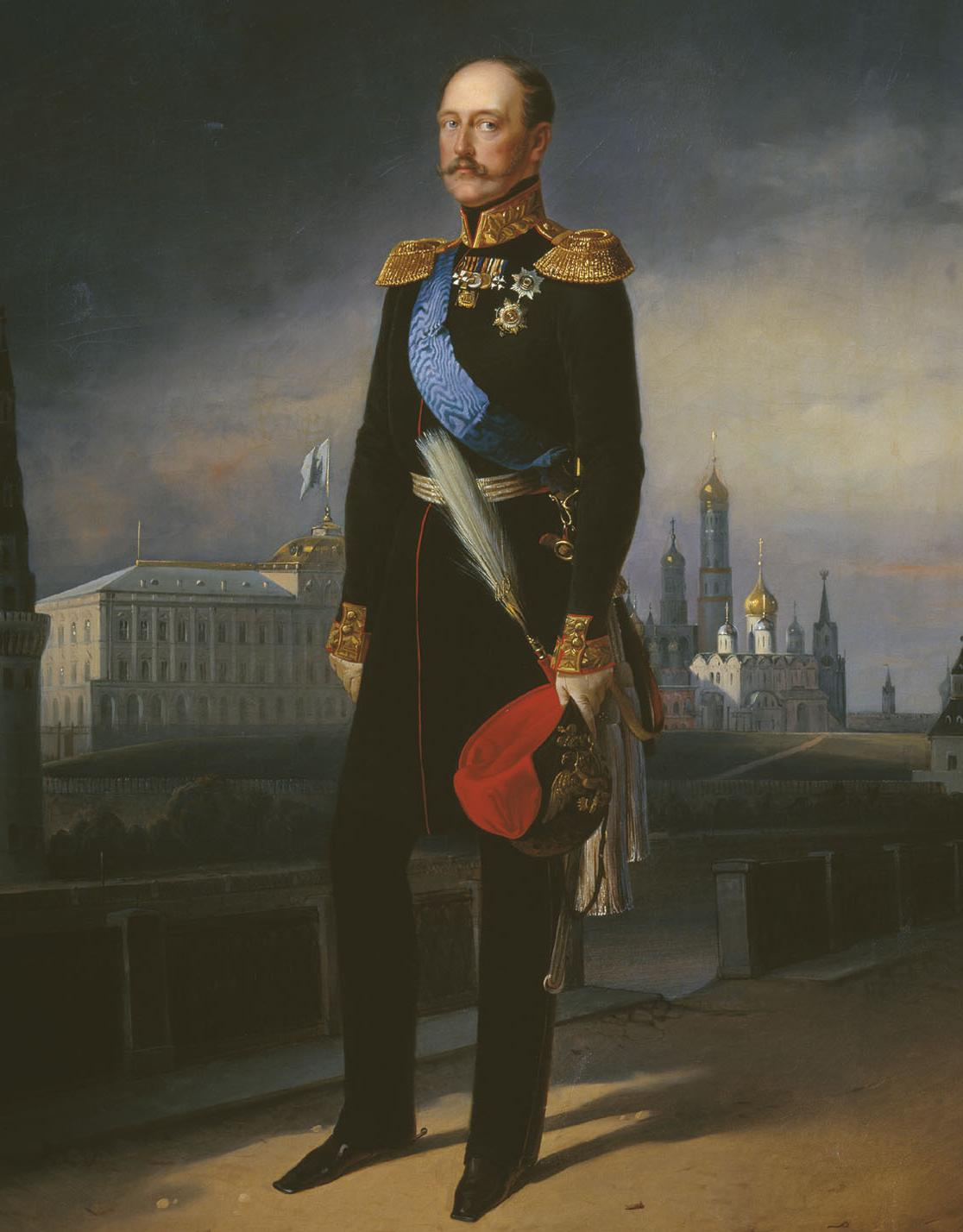
George Canning (left) was the architect of the Treaty of London, which launched European intervention in the Greek conflict.
Tsar Nicholas I (right) co-signed the Treaty of London, and then launched the Russo-Turkish War of 1828–1829, which finally secured Greek independence.

In August 1822, George Canning was appointed by the British government as Foreign Secretary, succeeding Castlereagh. Canning was influenced by the mounting popular agitation against the Ottomans, and believed that a settlement could no longer be postponed. He also feared that Russia might undertake unilateral action against the Ottoman Empire.

In March 1823, Canning declared that "when a whole nation revolts against its conqueror, the nation cannot be considered as piratical but as a nation in a state of war". In February 1823 he notified the Ottoman Empire that Britain would maintain friendly relations with the Turks only under the condition that the latter respected the Christian subjects of the Empire. The Commissioner of the Ionian Islands, which were a British colony, was ordered to consider the Greeks in a state of war and give them the right to cut off certain areas from which the Turks could get provisions.

These measures led to the increase of British influence. This influence was reinforced by the issuing of two loans that the Greeks managed to conclude with British fund-holders in 1824 and 1825. These loans, which, in effect, made the City of London the financier of the revolution, inspired the creation of the "British" political party in Greece, whose opinion was that the revolution could only end in success with the help of Britain. At the same time, parties affiliated to Russia and France made their appearance. These parties would later strive for power during king Otto's reign.

When Tsar Nicholas I succeeded Alexander in December 1825, Canning decided to act immediately: he sent the Duke of Wellington to Russia, and the outcome was the Protocol of St Petersburg of 4 April 1826. According to the protocol, the two powers agreed to mediate between the Ottomans and the Greeks on the basis of complete autonomy of Greece under Turkish sovereignty. The Anglo-Russian protocol that Wellington negotiated with Nicholas in St. Petersburg attracted much scorn from Metternich, who was consistently the most pro-Ottoman and anti-Greek European statesmen. Metternich dismissively wrote, "If the Irish were to revolt against the British Crown, and the King of France were to offer to mediate," leading him to ask: "Is England then ready to regard as a Power equal to rights to that of the [British] King the first Irish Club which declares itself the Insurgent Government of Ireland? To regard as justified the French Power which would accept the office of mediator, by reason of the sole fact that the invitation had been addressed to it by the Irish Government?...Whither does this absurdity not lead us?". Prussia, whose king Frederich Wilhelm was close to Metternich, chose to follow the Austrian lead. Before he met with Wellington, the Tsar had already sent an ultimatum to the Porte, demanding that the principalities be evacuated immediately, and that plenipotentiaries be sent to Russia to settle outstanding issues. The Sultan agreed to send the plenipotentiaries, and on 7 October 1826 signed the Akkerman Convention, in which Russian demands concerning Serbia and the principalities were accepted.

The Greeks formally applied for the mediation provided in the Petersburg Protocol, while the Turks and the Egyptians showed no willingness to stop fighting. France, which initially backed its client Muhammad Ali the Great with weapons and officers to train his army, changed its stance, partly because of the pro-Greek feelings of the French people, and partly because King Charles X saw the offer to impose mediation as a way of assuring French influence in Greece. Since Britain and Russia were going ahead with their plans to impose mediation with or without France, if the French declined the offer to impose mediation, Greece would be in the Anglo-Russian sphere of influence, while if the French did take part, then Greece would also be in the French sphere of influence. Canning therefore prepared for action by negotiating the Treaty of London (6 July 1827) with France and Russia. This provided that the Allies should again offer negotiations, and if the Sultan rejected it, they would exert all the means which circumstances would allow to force the cessation of hostilities. Meanwhile, news reached Greece in late July 1827 that Muhammad Ali's new fleet was completed in Alexandria and sailing towards Navarino to join the rest of the Egyptian-Turkish fleet. The aim of this fleet was to attack Hydra and knock the island's fleet out of the war. On 29 August, the Porte formally rejected the Treaty of London's stipulations, and, subsequently, the commanders-in-chief of the British and French Mediterranean fleets, Admiral Edward Codrington and Admiral Henri de Rigny, sailed into the Gulf of Argos and requested to meet with Greek representatives on board HMS Asia.

==== Battle of Navarino (1827) ====
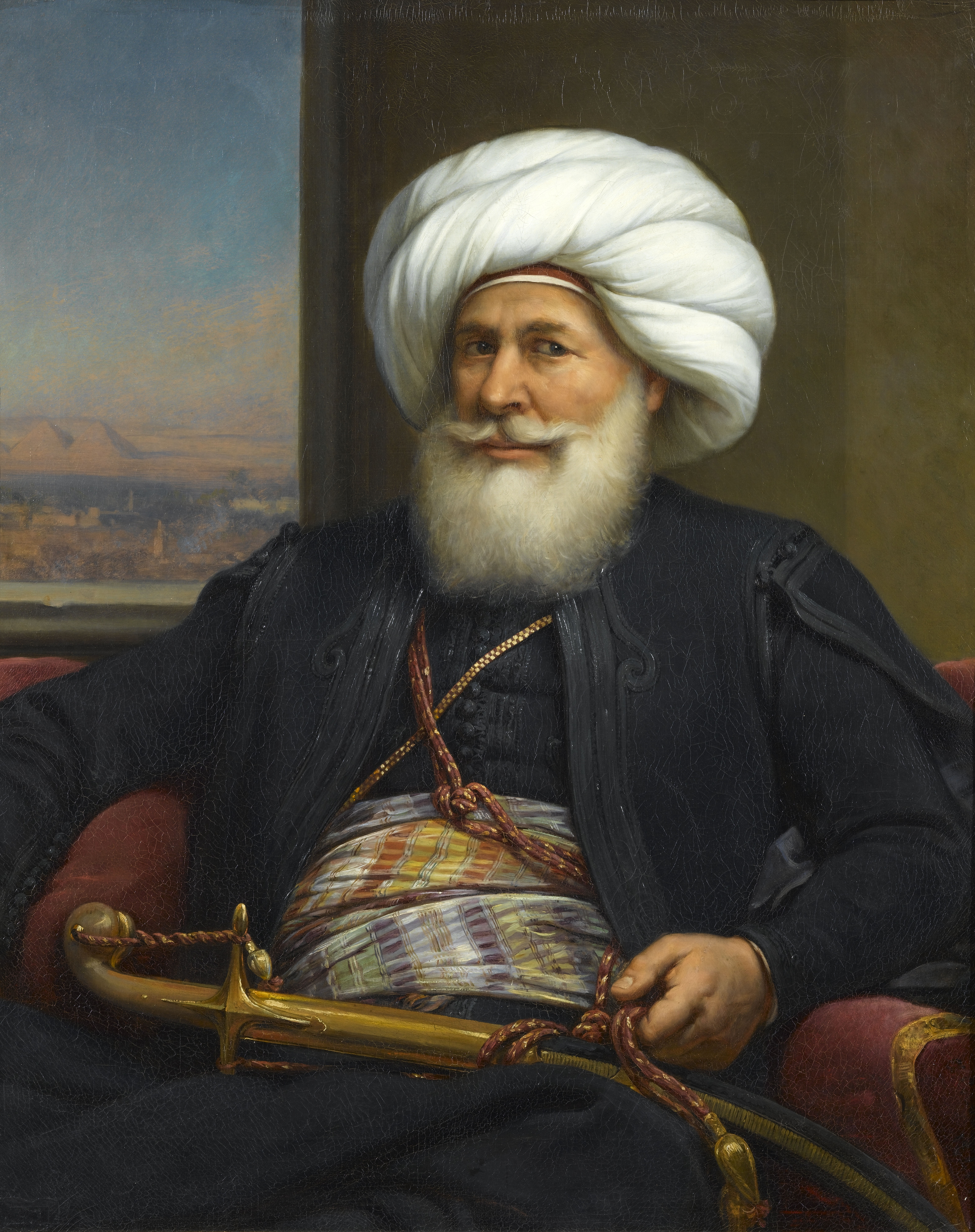
Portrait of Muhammad Ali Pasha (by Auguste Couder, 1841, Palace of Versailles), whose expedition to the Peloponnese precipitated European intervention in the Greek conflict.

After the Greek delegation, led by Mavrocordatos, accepted the terms of the treaty, the Allies prepared to insist upon the armistice, and their fleets were instructed to intercept supplies destined for Ibrahim's forces. When Muhammad Ali's fleet, which had been warned by the British and French to stay away from Greece, left Alexandria and joined other Ottoman/Egyptian units at Navarino on 8 September, Codrington arrived with his squadron off Navarino on 12 September. On 13 October, Codrington was joined, off Navarino, by his allied support, a French squadron under De Rigny and a Russian squadron under Login Geiden.

Upon their arrival at Navarino, Codgrinton and de Rigny tried to negotiate with Ibrahim, but Ibrahim insisted that by the Sultan's order he must destroy Hydra. Codrington responded by saying that if Ibrahim's fleets attempted to go anywhere but home, he would have to destroy them. Ibrahim agreed to write to the Sultan to see if he would change his orders, but he also complained about the Greeks being able to continue their attacks. Codrington promised that he would stop the Greeks and Philhellenes from attacking the Turks and Egyptians. After doing this, he disbanded most of his fleet, which returned to Malta, while the French went to the Aegean.

However, when Frank Hastings, a Philhellene, destroyed a Turkish naval squadron during a raid off Itea, Ibrahim sent a detachment of his fleet out of Navarino in order to defeat Hastings. Codrington had not heard of Hastings's actions and thought that Ibrahim was breaking his agreement. Codrington intercepted the force and made them retreat and did so again on the following day when Ibrahim led the fleet in person. Codrington assembled his fleet once more, with the British returning from Malta and the French from the Aegean. They were also joined by the Russian contingent led by Count Login Geiden. Ibrahim now began a campaign to annihilate the Greeks of the Peloponnese as he thought the Allies had reneged on their agreement.

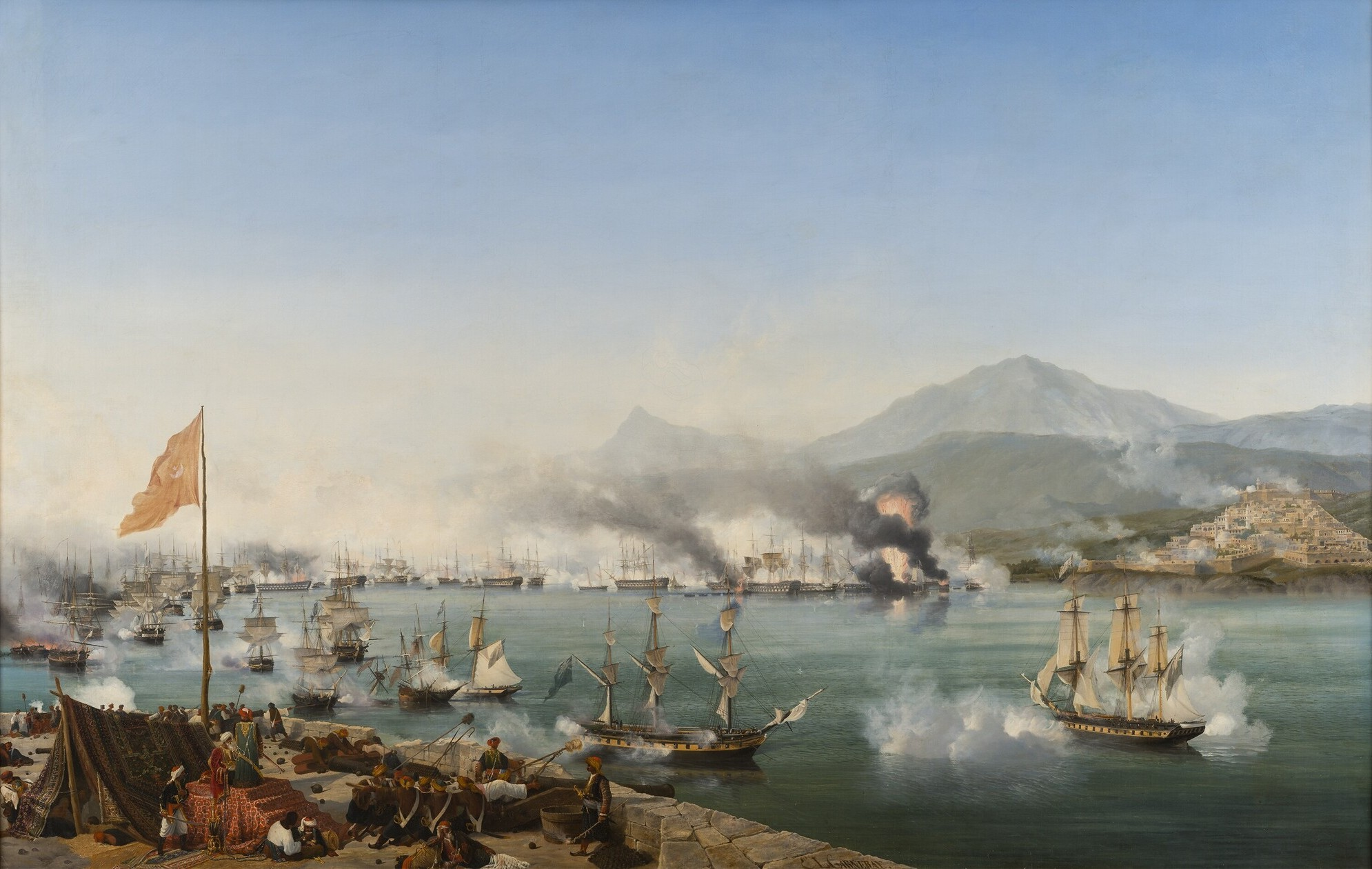
The Naval Battle of Navarino by Ambroise Louis Garneray (1827).

On 20 October 1827, as the weather got worse, the British, Russian and French fleets entered the Bay of Navarino in peaceful formation to shelter themselves and to make sure that the Egyptian-Turkish fleet did not slip off and attack Hydra. When a British frigate sent a boat to request the Egyptians to move their fire ships, the officer on board was shot by the Egyptians. The frigate responded with musket fire in retaliation and an Egyptian ship fired a cannon shot at the French flagship, the Sirene, which returned fire. A full engagement was begun which ended in a complete victory for the Allies and in the annihilation of the Egyptian-Turkish fleet. Of the 89 Egyptian-Turkish ships that took part in the battle, only 14 made it back to Alexandria and their dead amounted to over 8,000. The Allies did not lose a ship and suffered only 181 deaths. The Porte demanded compensation from the Allies for the ships, but his demand was refused on the grounds that the Turks had acted as the aggressors. The three countries' ambassadors also left Constantinople.

In Britain, the battle received a mixed reception. The British public, many of them Philhellenes, were overjoyed at the outcome of the battle which all but confirmed the independence of Greece. But in Whitehall, senior naval and diplomatic echelons were appalled by the outcome of his campaign. It was considered that Codrington had grossly exceeded his instructions by provoking a showdown with the Ottoman fleet, and that his actions had gravely compromised the Ottoman ability to resist Russian encroachment. At a social event, King George IV was reported as referring to the battle as "this untoward event". In France, the news of the battle was greeted with great enthusiasm and the government had an unexpected surge in popularity. Russia formally took the opportunity to declare war on the Turks (April 1828).

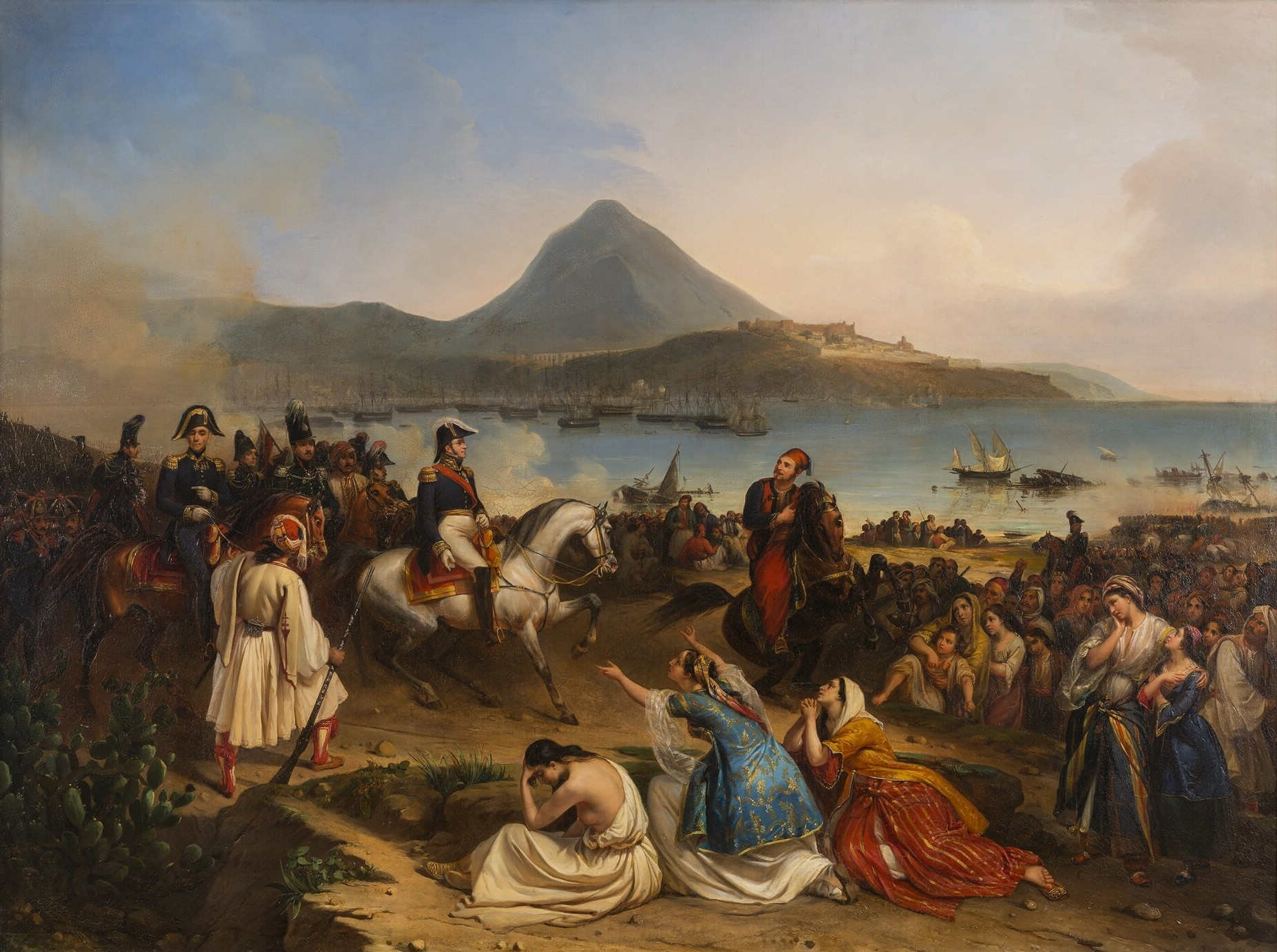
General Maison meeting Ibrahim Pasha in Navarino in September 1828 (by Jean-Charles Langlois,1838, Palace of Versailles).

In October 1828, the Greeks regrouped and formed a new government under Kapodistrias. Kapodistrias took advantage of the Russo-Turkish war and sent troops of the reorganised Hellenic Army to Central Greece. They advanced to seize as much territory as possible, including Athens and Thebes, before the Western powers imposed a ceasefire. These Greek victories were proved decisive for the including of more territories in the future State. As far as the Peloponnese was concerned, Britain and Russia accepted the offer of France to send an army to expel Ibrahim's forces. Nicolas Joseph Maison, who was given command of a French expeditionary Corps of 15,000 men, landed on 30 August 1828 at Petalidi and helped the Greeks evacuate the Peloponnese from all the hostile troops by 30 October. Maison thus implemented the convention Codrington had negotiated and signed in Alexandria with Muhammad Ali, which provided for the withdrawal of all Egyptian troops from the Peloponnese. The French troops, whose military engineers also helped rebuild the Peloponnese, were accompanied by seventeen distinguished scientists of the scientific expedition of Morea (botany, zoology, geology, geography, archaeology, architecture and sculpture), whose work was of major importance for the building of the new independent State. The French troops definitely left Greece after five years, in 1833.

The final major engagement of the war was the Battle of Petra, which occurred north of Attica. Greek forces under Demetrios Ypsilantis, for the first time trained to fight as a regular European army rather than as guerrilla bands, advanced against Aslan Bey's forces and defeated them. The Turks surrendered all lands from Livadeia to the Spercheios River in exchange for safe passage out of Central Greece. As George Finlay stresses: "Thus Prince Demetrios Ypsilantis had the honor of terminating the war which his brother had commenced on the banks of the Pruth."

==== Autonomy to independence ====
Map showing the original territory of the Kingdom of Greece as laid down in the Treaty of 1832 (in dark blue)

In September 1828, the Conference of Poros opened to discuss what should be the borders of Greece. On 21 December 1828, the ambassadors of Britain, Russia, and France met on the island of Poros and prepared a protocol, which provided for the creation of an autonomous state ruled by a monarch, whose authority should be confirmed by a firman of the Sultan. The proposed borderline ran from Arta to Volos, and, despite Kapodistrias' efforts, the new state would include only the islands of the Cyclades, the Sporades, Samos, and maybe Crete. The Sublime Porte, which had rejected the call for an armistice in 1827, now rejected the conclusions of the Poros conference, with the Sultan Mahmud II saying he would never grant Greece independence, and the war would go on until he reconquered all of Greece. Based on the Protocol of Poros, the London Conference agreed on the protocol of 22 March 1829, which accepted most of the ambassadors' proposals but drew the borders farther south than the initial proposal and did not include Samos and Crete in the new state.

Under pressure from Russia, the Porte finally agreed on the terms of the Treaty of London of 6 July 1827 and of the Protocol of 22 March 1829. Soon afterward, Britain and France conceived the idea of an independent Greek state, trying to limit the influence of Russia on the new state. Russia disliked the idea but could not reject it, and consequently the three powers finally agreed to create an independent Greek state under their joint protection, concluding the protocols of 3 February 1830.

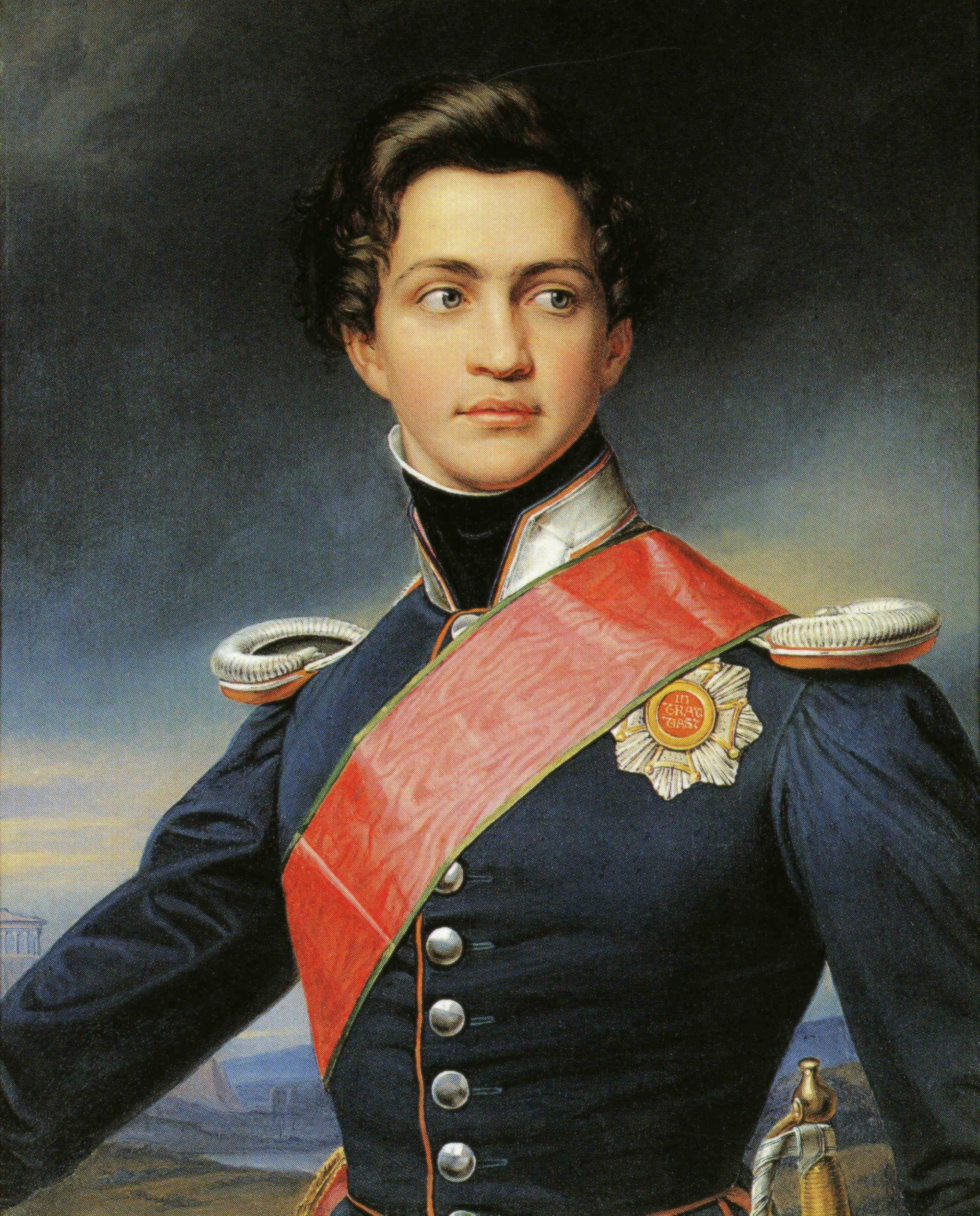
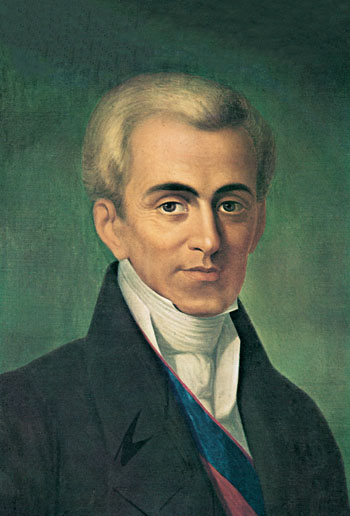
After Kapodistrias' assassination, the 1832 London Conference established the Kingdom of Greece with Otto of Bavaria (left) as the first king and Ioannis Kapodistrias (right) as the first head of state.

By one of the protocols, the Greek throne was initially offered to Leopold, Prince of Saxe-Coburg and Gotha and the future King of Belgium. Discouraged by the gloomy picture painted by Kapodistrias, and unsatisfied with the Aspropotamos-Zitouni borderline, which replaced the more favorable line running from Arta to Volos considered by the Great Powers earlier, he refused. Negotiations temporarily stalled after Kapodistrias was assassinated in 1831 in Nafplion by the Mavromichalis clan, after having demanded that they unconditionally submit to his authority. When they refused, Kapodistrias put Petrobey in jail, sparking vows of vengeance from his clan.

The withdrawal of Leopold as a candidate for the throne of Greece and the July Revolution in France further delayed the final settlement of the new kingdom's frontiers until a new government was formed in Britain. Lord Palmerston, who took over as British Foreign Secretary, agreed to the Arta–Volos borderline. However, the secret note on Crete, which the Bavarian plenipotentiary communicated to Britain, France and Russia, bore no fruit.

In May 1832, Palmerston convened the London Conference. The three Great Powers, Britain, France and Russia, offered the throne to the Bavarian prince, Otto of Wittelsbach; meanwhile, the Fifth National Assembly at Nafplion had approved the choice of Otto, and passed the Constitution of 1832 (which would come to be known as the "Hegemonic Constitution"). As co-guarantors of the monarchy, the Great Powers also agreed to guarantee a loan of 60 million francs to the new king, empowering their ambassadors in the Ottoman capital to secure the end of the war. Under the protocol signed on 7 May 1832 between Bavaria and the protecting powers, Greece was defined as a "monarchical and independent state" but was to pay an indemnity to the Porte. The protocol outlined the way in which the Regency was to be managed until Otto reached his majority, while also concluding the second Greek loan for a sum of £2.4 million.

On 21 July 1832, British Ambassador to the Sublime Porte Sir Stratford Canning and the other representatives of the Great Powers signed the Treaty of Constantinople, which defined the boundaries of the new Greek Kingdom at the Arta–Volos line. The borders of the kingdom were reiterated in the London Protocol of 30 August 1832, also signed by the Great Powers, which ratified the terms of the Constantinople arrangement.

=== Massacres ===
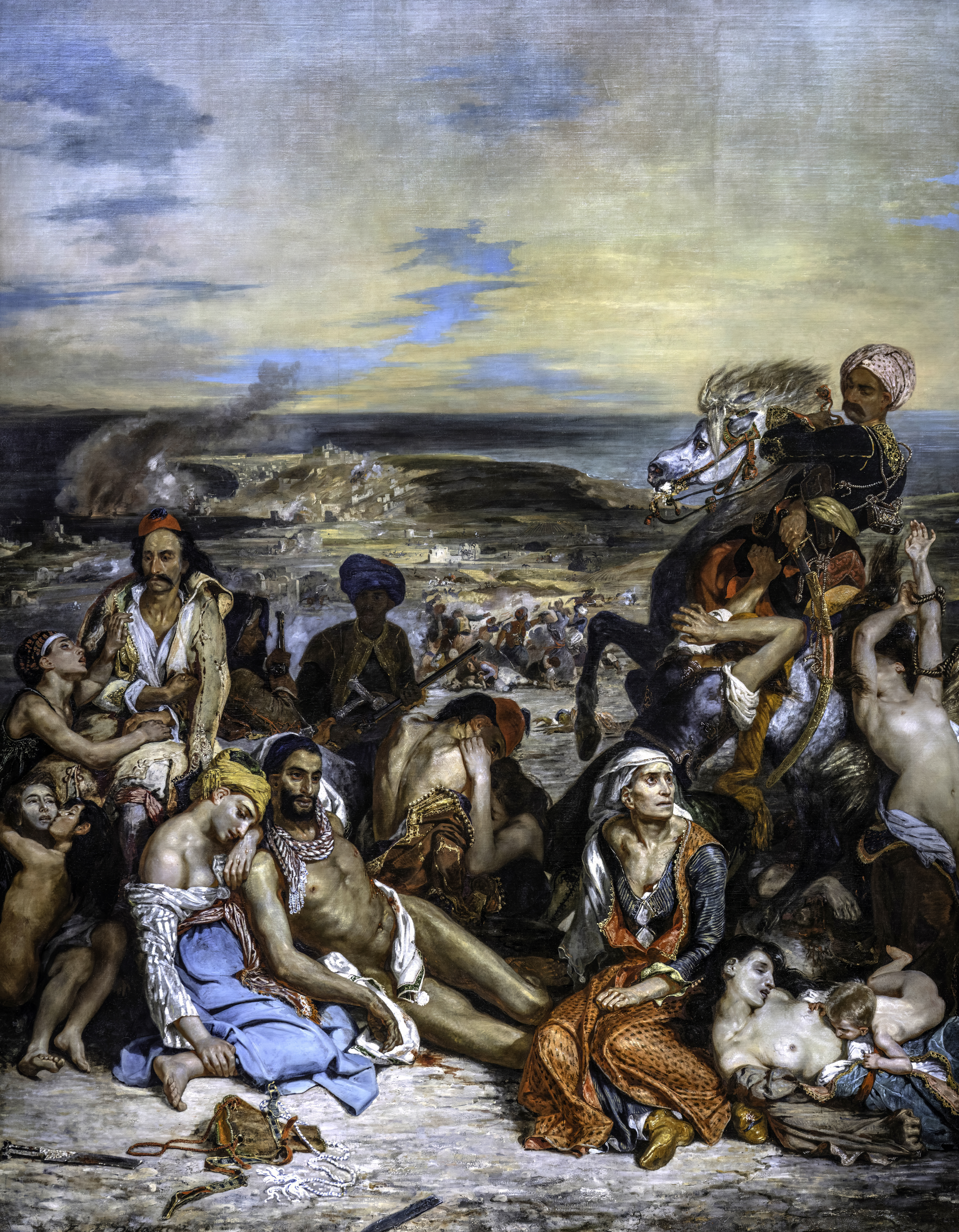
Eugène Delacroix's Massacre of Chios (1824, oil on canvas, Louvre, Paris)

Almost as soon as the revolution began, there were several massacres of civilians by both Greek revolutionaries and Ottoman forces. (Note: St. Clair characterizes the Greek War of Independence as "a series of opportunist massacres".) The revolutionaries massacred Jews, Muslims and Christians alike suspected of pro-Ottoman sympathies, mainly in the Peloponnese and Attica, where ethnic Greeks were dominant. Ottoman forces massacred Greeks suspected of supporting the revolutionaries, especially in Anatolia, Crete, Cyprus, Macedonia and the Aegean islands. They also massacred Greeks in areas which did not revolt, as in Smyrna and in Constantinople.

Some of the more infamous atrocities include the massacres at Chios and Constantinople, the destruction of Psara, massacre of Samothrace, Kasos Massacre, Naousa massacre, third siege of Missolonghi, Tripolitsa Massacre and Navarino Massacre. There is debate among scholars over whether the massacres committed by the Greeks should be regarded as a response to prior events (such as the massacre of the Greeks of Tripoli, after the failed Orlov Revolt of 1770 and the destruction of the Sacred Band) or as separate atrocities, which started simultaneously with the outbreak of the revolt.

During the war, tens of thousands of Greek civilians were killed, left to die or taken into slavery. Most of the Greeks in the Greek quarter of Constantinople were massacred. A large number of Christian clergymen were also killed, including the Ecumenical Patriarch Gregory V. (Note: As they did in similar cases in the past, the Turks executed the Patriarch after they had had him deposed and replaced, not as patriarch but as a disloyal subject. Georgiades–Arnakis asserts that "though the Porte took care not to attack the church as an institution, Greek ecclesiastical leaders knew that they were practically helpless in times of trouble.")

Sometimes marked as allies of the Turks in the Peloponnese, Jewish settlements were also massacred by Greek revolutionaries; Steve Bowman argues that the tragedy may have been more a side-effect of the butchering of the Turks of Tripolis, the last Ottoman stronghold in the South, where the Jews had taken refuge from the fighting, than a specific action against Jews as such. Many Jews around Greece and throughout Europe were supporters of the Greek revolt, using their resources to loan substantial amounts to the newly formed Greek government. In turn, the success of the Greek Revolution was to stimulate the incipient stirrings of Jewish nationalism, later called Zionism. According to historian Yanni Kotsonis, the revolution was demographic in nature—"novel and shocking violence" was visited throughout the area and "destroyed an entire category of population", which was "not an unintended consequence; it was the goal of the warfare".

In total, it is estimated that 230,000–600,000 Greek civilians and 25,000 Muslim civilians lost their lives as a result of the war.

== Aftermath ==
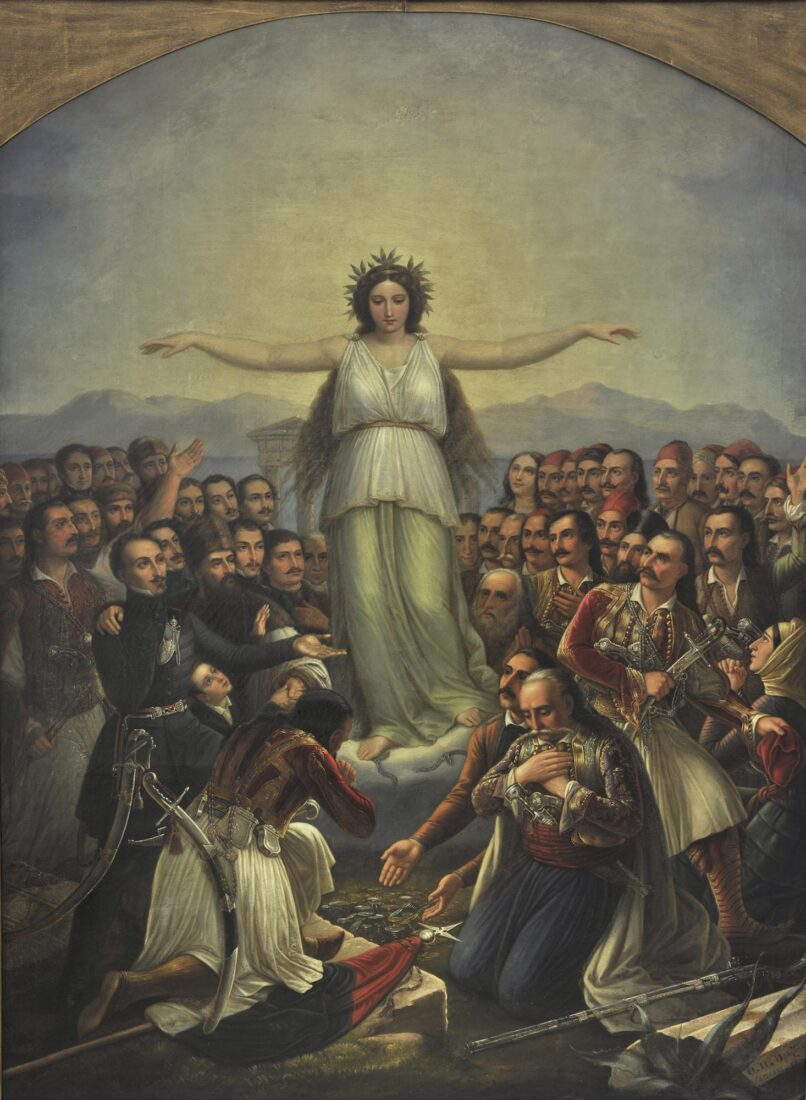
"Grateful Hellas" by Theodoros Vryzakis

The consequences of the Greek revolution were somewhat ambiguous in the immediate aftermath. An independent Greek state had been established, but Britain, Russia and France still had significant influence in Greek politics, selecting an imported Bavarian prince as ruler. The country had been ravaged by ten years of fighting and was full of displaced refugees and empty Turkish estates, necessitating a series of land reforms over several decades.

The population of the new state numbered 800,000, representing less than one-third of the 2.5 million Greek inhabitants of the Ottoman Empire. During a great part of the next century, the Greek state sought the liberation of the "unredeemed" Greeks of the Ottoman Empire, in accordance with the Megali Idea, i.e., the goal of uniting all Greeks in one country.

As a people, the Greeks no longer provided the princes for the Danubian Principalities, and were regarded within the Ottoman Empire, especially by the Muslim population, as traitors. Phanariotes, who had until then held high office within the Ottoman Empire, were thenceforth regarded as suspect, and lost their special, privileged status. In Constantinople and the rest of the Ottoman Empire where Greek banking and merchant presence had been dominant, Armenians mostly replaced Greeks in banking, and Jewish merchants gained importance.

"Today the fatherland is reborn, that for so long was lost and extinguished. Today are raised from the dead the fighters, political, religious, as well as military, for our King has come, that we begat with the power of God. Praised be your most virtuous name, omnipotent and most merciful Lord."
Makriyannis' Memoirs on the arrival of King Otto.

The war would prove a seminal event in the history of the Ottoman Empire, despite the small size and the impoverishment of the new Greek state. For the first time, a Christian subject people had achieved independence from Ottoman rule and established a fully independent state, recognized by Europe. Whereas previously only large nations (such as the Prussians or Austrians) had been judged worthy of national self-determination by the great powers, the Greek revolt legitimized the concept of small nation-states, and emboldened nationalist movements among other subject peoples of the Ottoman Empire.

Shortly after the war ended, the people of the Russian-dependent Poland, encouraged by the Greek victory, started the November Uprising, hoping to regain their independence. This uprising failed however, and Polish independence would not be restored until 1918 at Versailles.

The newly established Greek state would pursue further expansion and, over the course of a century, parts of Macedonia, Crete, parts of Epirus, many Aegean Islands, the Ionian Islands and other Greek-speaking territories would unite with the new Greek state.

== Revolutionary flags ==
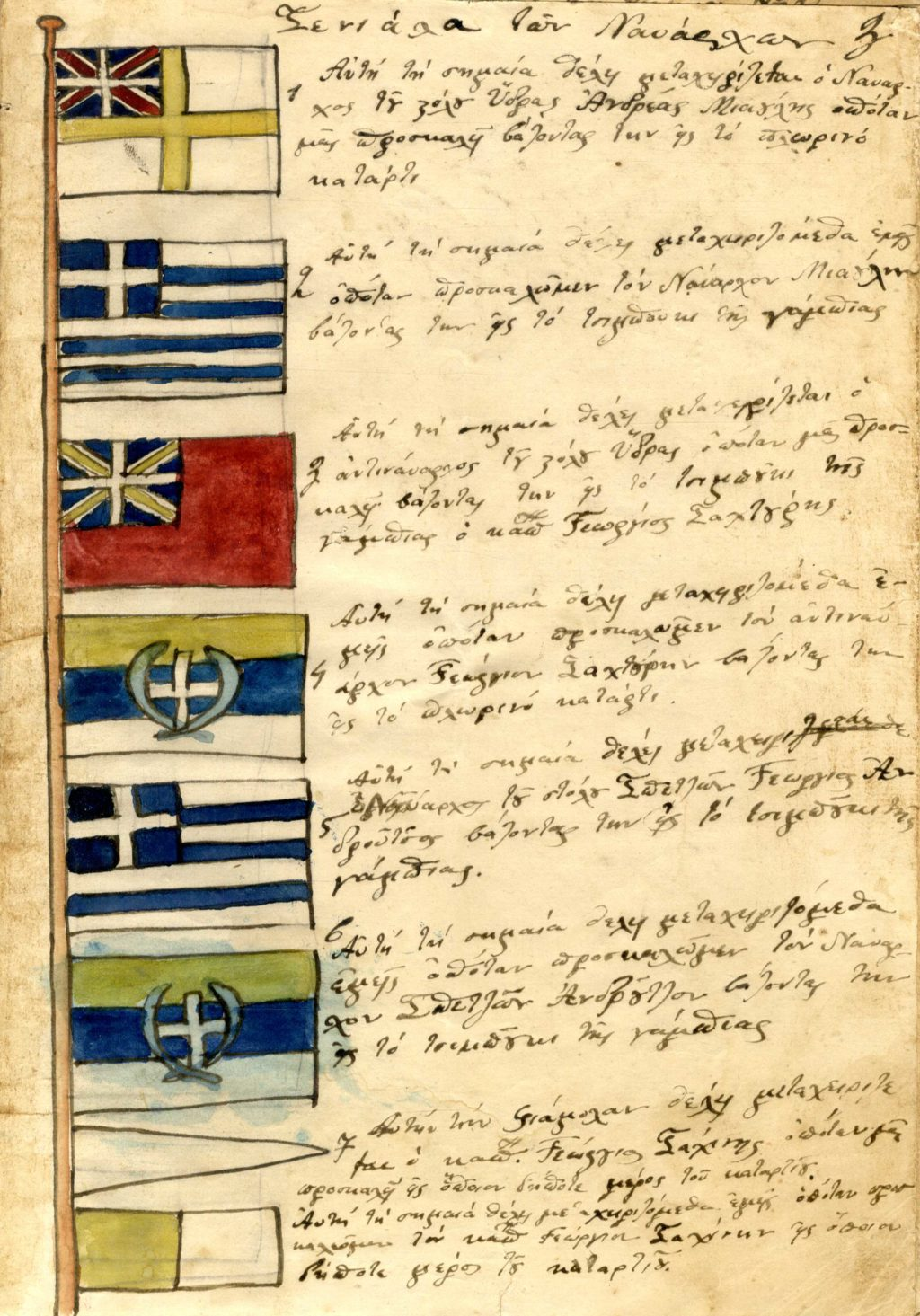
Flags used by various admirals of the Revolutionary Navy from an 1823 manuscript.

Flag of the Sacred Band

Raised in Patras by Andreas Londos

Flag from Thrace and Samothrace

Flag of Psara island

Flag of Spetses island

Flag of Athanasios Diakos

Flag of the Maniots

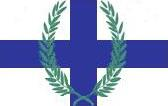
Used in Thessaly, created by Anthimos Gazis

Flag of the Military-Political System of Samos

Very widespread flag used by all the revolutionaries

Flag of Markos Botsaris

== Legacy ==
=== Music inspired by the Greek War of Independence ===
In 1971, the Municipality of Thessaloniki commissioned a symphonic work for the 150th anniversary of the Greek Revolution. Nicolas Astrinidis' choral Symphony "1821" was premiered on 27 October 1971 at the 6th "Demetria".

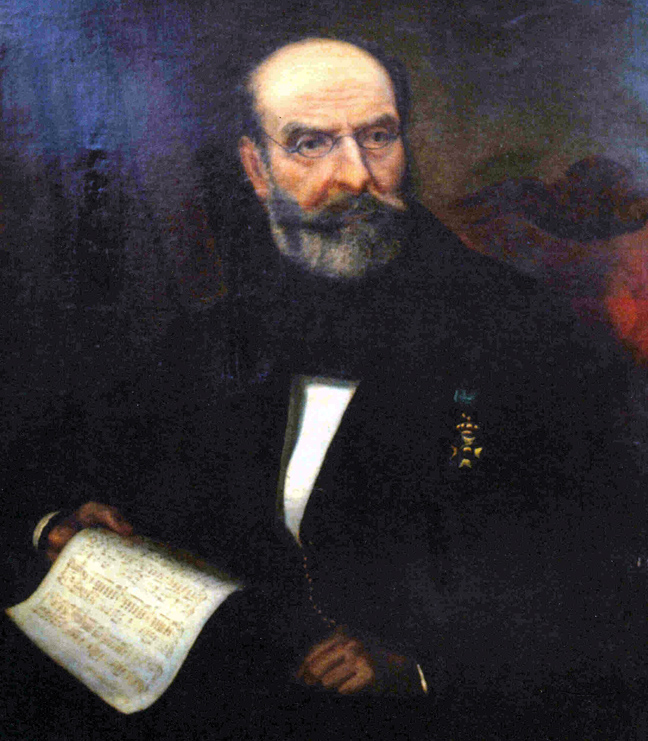
Nikolaos Mantzaros' most popular work is the music for Hymn to Liberty, whose first and second stanzas became the national anthem in 1865

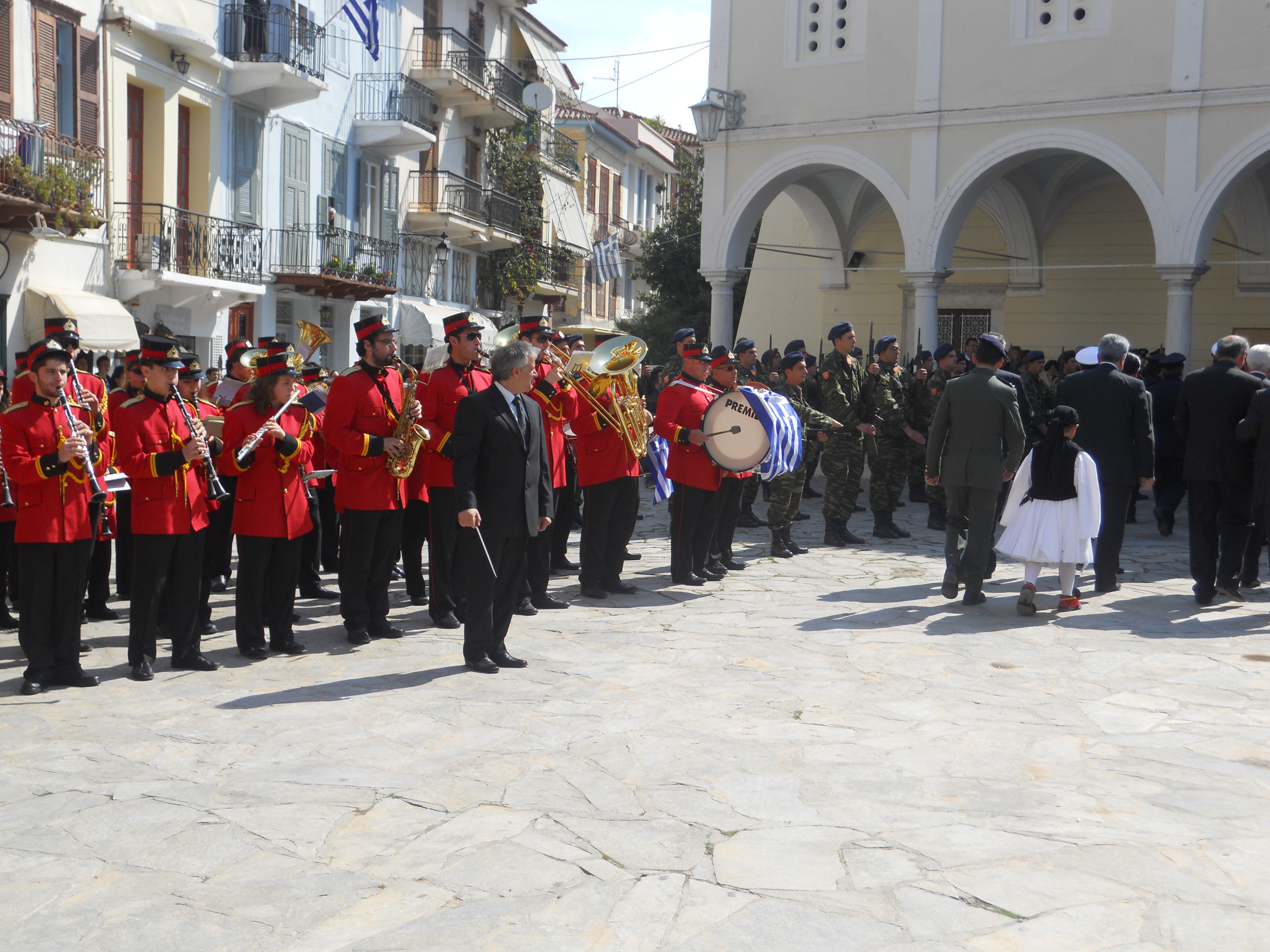
Band in a parade on 25 March

After nearly four hundred years of foreign rule, Greeks often used music and poetry as a means of empowerment in the war. Rigas Feraios (1757–1798) was a very prominent poet and intellectual of the Greek independence movement. Many of his poems urged the people of Greece to leave the cities, head to the mountains where they would have more freedom, and unite to gain their independence.

Dionysios Solomos (1798–1857) was another national poet inspired by the Greek War of Independence. Solomos wrote the Hymn to Liberty, now the national anthem, in 1823, two years after the Greeks started the war against the Ottoman Empire. The poem itself is 158 stanzas, but officially only the first two are the anthem. It is the national anthem not only of Greece but also of Cyprus, which adopted it in 1966.

To this day, many songs are sung by Greeks worldwide on 25 March to celebrate their liberation and showcase their respect for the lives that were lost during the four hundred years of Ottoman rule.

Music inspired by the Greek War of Independence
Song name	Sung by	Released
Ola Ta Ethni Polemoun 'Ολα Τα Έθνη πολεμούν	Rigas Feraios & Christos Leontis Ρήγας Φεραιός & Χρήστος Λεοντής	N/A
O Thourios Tou Riga Ο Θούριος Του Ρήγα	Nikos Xilouris Νίκος Ξυλούρης	1797 (the poem)
Saranta Palikaria Σαράντα Παλικάρια	Stelios Kazantzidis Στέλιος Καζαντζίδης	N/A
Tis Dikeosinis Ilie Noite Της δικαιοσύνης Ήλιε Νοητέ	Grigoris Mpithikotsis Γρηγόρης Μπιθικώτσης	1964
Perifanoi Oloi Περήφανοι ΄Ολοι	Paschalis Arvanitidis Πασχάλης Αρβανιτίδης	1967
Na'tane To 21 Να'τανε Το 21	George Dalaras Γιώργος Νταλάρας	1970
Kleftiki Zoi Κλέφτικη Ζωή	Loukianos Kilaidonis Λουκιάνος Κηλαηδόνης	1992

== See also ==
- Evzones
- Greek National Awakening
- History of Greece
- Phoenix (currency)
- Propylaea (Munich)
- Balkan Wars
- List of wars of independence

== Sources ==
- Απομνημονεύματα Μακρυγιάννη – εκδοση Γιάννη Βλαχογιάννη 1908.
- See the sources listed and the discussion of the revolution in Gallant, Thomas W. (2015). The Edinburgh History of the Greeks: The Edinburgh History of the Greeks, 1768 to 1913. The Long Nineteenth Century (Vol. 9). Edinburgh: Edinburgh University Press. ISBN 978-0748636068.

=== Secondary sources ===
- Adanir, Fikret (2006). "Semi-autonomous Provincial Forces in the Balkans and Anatolia". In Fleet, Kate; Faroqhi, Suraiya; Kasaba, Reşat (eds.). The Cambridge History of Turkey. Vol. 3. Cambridge University Press. ISBN 0521620953.
- Anderson, R. C. (1952). Naval Wars in the Levant 1559–1853. Princeton: Princeton University Press.
- Batalas, Achilles (2003). "Send a Thief to Catch a Thief: State-building and the Employment of Irregular Military Formations in Mid-Nineteenth-Century Greece". In Diane E. Davis; Anthony W. Pereira (eds.). Irregular Armed Forces and Their Role in Politics and State Formation. Cambridge University Press. ISBN 0521812771.
- Barker, Philip W. (2008). "Greece". Religious Nationalism in Modern Europe. Taylor & Francis. ISBN 978-0415775144.
- Bisaha, Nancy (2006). "Byzantium and Greek Refugees". Creating East and West. University of Pennsylvania Press. ISBN 0812219767.
- Booras, Harris John (1934). Hellenic Independence and America's Contribution to the Cause. Tuttle Publishing. OCLC 9505286.[ISBN unspecified]
- Bowman, Steven (2004). "The Jews in Greece". In Ehrlich, Leonard H.; Bolozky, Shmuel; Rothstein, Robert A.; Schwartz, Murray; Berkovitz, Jay R.; Young, James E. (eds.). Textures and Meanings: Thirty Years of Judaic Studies at the University of Massachusetts Amherst. University of Massachusetts Amherst. Archived from the original on 23 March 2010.
- Brewer, David (2003) [2001]. The Greek War of Independence: The Struggle for Freedom from Ottoman Oppression and the Birth of the Modern Greek Nation. Overlook Press. ISBN 1585673951.
- Bridge, F.R.; Bullen, Roger (2005). "Every Nation for Itself". The Great Powers and the European States System 1814–1914. I.B. Tauris. ISBN 0582784581.
- Brown, L. Carl (1984). International Politics and the Middle East: Old Rules, Dangerous Game. I.B. Tauris. ISBN 1850430004.
- Clogg, Richard (2002) [1992]. A Concise History of Greece (2nd ed.). Cambridge: Cambridge University Press. ISBN 0521004799.
- Dakin, Douglas (1973). The Greek struggle for independence, 1821–1833. University of California Press. ISBN 0520023420.
- Dakin, Douglas. "The Origins of the Greek Revolution of 1821." History 37.131 (1952): 228–235. online
- Clogg, Richard (May 1972). "Review, The Great Church in Captivity: A study of the Patriarchate of Constantinople from the Eve of the Turkish Conquest to the Greek War of Independence". Middle Eastern Studies. 8 (2): 247–257. doi:10.1080/00263207208700210.
- Detorakis, Theocharis (1988). "Η Τουρκοκρατία στην Κρήτη ("Turkish rule in Crete")". In Panagiotakis, Nikolaos M. (ed.). Crete, History and Civilization (in Greek). Vol. II. Vikelea Library, Association of Regional Associations of Regional Municipalities. pp. 333–436.
- Dodsley, James (1833). Annual Register. University of California. p. 910.
- Frazee, Charles A. (1969). "The Year of Revolution 1821". The Orthodox Church and Independent Greece. CUP Archive.
- Georgiades–Arnakis, G. (September 1952). "The Greek Church of Constantinople and the Ottoman Empire". The Journal of Modern History. 24 (3): 235–250. doi:10.1086/237518. JSTOR 1875481. S2CID 144899655.
- Goldstein, Erik (1992). Wars and Peace Treaties, 1816–1991. Routledge. ISBN 0415078229.
- Grenet, Mathieu (2016). La fabrique communautaire. Les Grecs à Venise, Livourne et Marseille, 1770–1840. École française d'Athènes and École française de Rome. ISBN 978-2728312108.
- Hitchins, Keith (1996). "The Beginnings of a Modern State". The Romanians, 1774–1866. Clarendon Press. ISBN 978-0198205913.
- Howarth, David (1976). The Greek Adventure: Lord Byron and Other Eccentrics in the War of Independence. Atheneum. ISBN 068910653X.
- Jelavich, Barbara (1983). History of the Balkans, 18th and 19th centuries. New York: Cambridge University Press. ISBN 0521274583.
- Kassis, Kyriakos (1979). Mani's History. Athens: Presfot. OCLC 84828605.[ISBN unspecified]
- Koliopoulos, John S. (1987). Brigands with a Cause: Brigandage and Irredentism in Modern Greece, 1821–1912. Clarendon. ISBN 0198886535.
- Koliopoulos, John S.; Veremis, Thanos M. (2004). "A Regime to Suit the Nation". Greece: the Modern Sequel. C. Hurst & Co. Publishers. ISBN 1850654638.
- Krimbas, Costas B. (2005). "Greek Auditors in the Courses of Jean Lamarck". The Historical Review. 2: 153–159. Archived from the original on 23 July 2011.
- McGregor, Andrew James (2006). "Egypt in the Greek Revolution". A Military History of Modern Egypt. Greenwood Publishing Group. ISBN 0275986012.
- Marriott, J. A. R. The Eastern Question An Historical Study In European Diplomacy (1940) pp. 193–225. online
- Mazower, Mark (2004). Salonica, City of Ghosts: Christians, Muslims and Jews, 1430–1950. London: HarperCollins. ISBN 0007120230.
- Michalopoulos, Dimitris, America, Russia and the Birth of Modern Greece, Washington & London: Academica Press, 2020, ISBN 978-1680539424
- Miller, William (1966). "The War of Greek Independence". The Ottoman Empire and Its Successors. Routledge. ISBN 0714619744.
- Miller, Marion S. "A 'Liberal International'? Perspectives on Comparative Approaches to the Revolutions in Spain, Italy, and Greece in the 1820s." Mediterranean Studies 2 (1990): 61–67. online
- Milton, John; Diekhoff, John Siemon (1965). Milton on himself. Cohen & West. p. 267. OCLC 359509.
- Panagiotopoulos, Vassilis, ed. (2003). History of Modern Hellenism (in Greek). Vol. III. Athens: Ellinika Grammata. ISBN 9604065408.
  - Papageorgiou, Stephanos P. "The First Year of Freedom". In Panagiotopoulos (2003), pp. 53–72.
  - Theodoridis, Georgios K. "A Modern State". In Panagiotopoulos (2003), pp. 125–142.
  - Tzakis, Dionysis. "The Military Events (1822–1824)". In Panagiotopoulos (2003), pp. 73–102.
- Paparrigopoulos, Constantine; Karolidis, Pavlos (1925). History of the Hellenic Nation. Athens: Eleftheroudakis.
- Phillips, W. Alison. The war of Greek independence, 1821 to 1833 (1897) online
- Pizanias, Petros (2011). The Greek revolution of 1821 : a European event. Isis Press. ISBN 978-9754284256.
- Rivlin, Brancha (1988). The Holocaust in Greece. Keterpress Enterprises Jerusalem.
- Roy, Christian (2005). "Annunciation". Traditional Festivals. ABC-CLIO. ISBN 1576070891.
- Santelli, Maureen Connors (2020). The Greek Fire: American-Ottoman Relations and Democratic Fervor in the Age of Revolutions. Cornell University Press. ISBN 978-1501715785.
- St. Clair, William (2009) [2008]. That Greece Might Still Be Free – The Philhellenes in the War of Independence (2nd ed.). Open Book Publishers. doi:10.11647/OBP.0001. ISBN 978-1906924003.
- Stavrianos, L.S. (2000). "Age of Nationalism 1815–1878". The Balkans since 1453. C. Hurst & Co. Publishers. ISBN 1850655510.
- Sayyid-Marsot, Afaf Lutfi (1984). "Expansion to what End". Egypt in the Reign of Muhammad Ali. Cambridge University Press. ISBN 0521289688.
- Stoianovich, Traian (1960). "The Conquering Balkan Orthodox Merchant". The Journal of Economic History. 20 (2). Cambridge University Press: 234–313. doi:10.1017/S0022050700110447. S2CID 153742099.
- Svoronos, Nikos (2004). "The Ideology of the Organization and of the Survival of the Nation". The Greek Nation. Polis. ISBN 9604350285.
- Svoronos, Nikos G. (1999) [first edition 1972 in French]. History of Modern Greece (in Greek). Translated by Aikaterini Asdracha (2007 ed.). Athens: Themelio. ISBN 978-9607293213.
- Topping, Peter (June 1961). "Greek Historical Writing on the Period 1453–1914". The Journal of Modern History. 33 (2): 157–173. doi:10.1086/238781. S2CID 143901738.
- Trent, James (2012). The Manliest Man: Samuel G. Howe and the Contours of Nineteenth Century American Reform. University of Massachusetts Press. ISBN 978-1558499591.
- Trent, James (2015–2016). "'Vulgar Appearing Little Bodies': Samuel G. Howe and American Missionaries in Greece, 1827–1830". Journal of Unitarian Universalist History. 39: 1–18.
- Trudgill, Peter (2000). "Greece and European Turkey". In Barbour, Stephen; Carmichael, Cathie (eds.). Language and Nationalism in Europe. Vol. 3. Oxford University Press. ISBN 0198236719.
- Troyat, Henri (1984). Alexander of Russia. St Edmundsbury Press. ISBN 0450060411.
- Vacalopoulos, Apostolos E. (1973). History of Macedonia, 1354–1833 (translated by P. Megann). Zeno Publishers. ISBN 0900834897.
- Vakalopoulos, Apostolos E. (1974). Ιστορία του νέου ελληνισμού, Τόμος Α′: Αρχές και διαμόρφωσή του (Έκδοση Β′) [History of modern Hellenism, Volume I: Its origins and formation] (in Greek) (2nd ed.). Thessaloniki.
- Vakalopoulos, Apostolos E. (1976). Ιστορία του νέου ελληνισμού, Τόμος B′: Οι ιστορικές βάσεις της νεοελληνικής κοινωνίας και οικονομίας (Έκδοση Β′) [History of modern Hellenism, Volume II: The historical basis of modern Greek society and economy] (in Greek) (2nd ed.). Thessaloniki.
- Vakalopoulos, Apostolos E. (1968). Ιστορία του νέου ελληνισμού, Τόμος Γ′: Τουρκοκρατία 1453–1669 – Οι αγώνες για την πίστη και την ελευθερία (Έκδοση Β′) [History of modern Hellenism, Volume III: Turkish rule 1453–1669 – Struggles for faith and freedom] (in Greek) (2nd ed.). Thessaloniki.
- Vakalopoulos, Apostolos E. (1973). Ιστορία του νέου ελληνισμού, Τόμος Δ′: Τουρκοκρατία 1669–1812 – Η οικονομική άνοδος και ο φωτισμός του γένους (Έκδοση Β′) [History of modern Hellenism, Volume IV: Turkish rule 1669–1812 – Economic upturn and enlightenment of the nation] (in Greek) (2nd ed.). Thessaloniki.
- Vakalopoulos, Apostolos E. (1980). Ιστορία του νέου ελληνισμού, Τόμος Ε′: Η Μεγάλη Ελληνική Επανάσταση (1821–1829) – Οι προϋποθέσεις και οι βάσεις της, 1813–1822 [History of modern Hellenism, Volume V: The Great Greek Revolution (1821–1829) – Its preconditions and foundations, 1813–1822] (in Greek). Thessaloniki.
- Vakalopoulos, Apostolos E. (1982). Ιστορία του νέου ελληνισμού, Τόμος ΣΤ′: Η Μεγάλη Ελληνική Επανάσταση (1821–1829) – Η εσωτερική κρίση (1822–1825) [History of modern Hellenism, Volume VI: The Great Greek Revolution (1821–1829) – Internal Crisis (1822–1825)] (in Greek). Thessaloniki.
- Vakalopoulos, Apostolos E. (1986). Ιστορία του νέου ελληνισμού, Τόμος Ζ′: Η Μεγάλη Ελληνική Επανάσταση (1821–1829) – Ο αφρικανικός σιμούν, ή η επιδρομή του Ιμπραήμ στην Ελλάδα (1825–1828) [History of modern Hellenism, Volume VII: The Great Greek Revolution (1821–1829) – The African simoom, or Ibrahim's raid in Greece (1825–1828)] (in Greek). Thessaloniki.
- Vakalopoulos, Apostolos E. (1988). Ιστορία του νέου ελληνισμού, Τόμος Η′: Η Μεγάλη Ελληνική Επανάσταση (1821–1829) – Ιωάννης Καποδίστριας, ή η επώδυνη γένεση του νεοελληνικού κράτους (1828–27 Σεπτ. 1831) [History of modern Hellenism, Volume VIII: The Great Greek Revolution (1821–1829) – Ioannis Kapodistrias, or the painful birth of the modern Greek state (1828–27 Sept. 1831)] (in Greek). Thessaloniki: Emm. Sfakianakis & Sons.
- Vacalopoulos, Apostolos E. (1975). The Greek Nation, 1453–1669: the Cultural and Economic Background of Modern Greek Society. Rutgers University Press. ISBN 081350810X.
- Verzijl, Jan Hendrik Willem (1968). International Law in Historical Perspective. Vol. VI. Martinus Nijhoff Publishers. ISBN 9028602232.
- Speros, Vryonis (2002). "The Ghost of Athens in Byzantine and Ottoman Times". Balkan Studies. 43 (1): 5–115.
- Zelepos, Ioannis (2018), Greek War of Independence (1821–1832), EGO – European History Online, Mainz: Institute of European History, retrieved: March 17, 2021 (pdf).
