= 1790 =

1790 in various calendars
- Gregorian calendar: 1790; MDCCXC
- Ab urbe condita: 2543
- Armenian calendar: 1239; ԹՎ ՌՄԼԹ
- Assyrian calendar: 6540
- Balinese saka calendar: 1711–1712
- Bengali calendar: 1196–1197
- Berber calendar: 2740
- British Regnal year: 30 Geo. 3 – 31 Geo. 3
- Buddhist calendar: 2334
- Burmese calendar: 1152
- Byzantine calendar: 7298–7299
- Chinese calendar: 己酉年 (Earth Rooster); 4487 or 4280 — to — 庚戌年 (Metal Dog); 4488 or 4281
- Coptic calendar: 1506–1507
- Discordian calendar: 2956
- Ethiopian calendar: 1782–1783
- Hebrew calendar: 5550–5551
- Hindu calendars
- Vikram Samvat: 1846–1847
- Shaka Samvat: 1711–1712
- Kali Yuga: 4890–4891
- Holocene calendar: 11790
- Igbo calendar: 790–791
- Iranian calendar: 1168–1169
- Islamic calendar: 1204–1205
- Japanese calendar: Kansei 2 (寛政２年)
- Javanese calendar: 1716–1717
- Julian calendar: Gregorian minus 11 days
- Korean calendar: 4123
- Minguo calendar: 122 before ROC 民前122年
- Nanakshahi calendar: 322
- Thai solar calendar: 2332–2333
- Tibetan calendar: ས་མོ་བྱ་ལོ་ (female Earth-Bird); 1916 or 1535 or 763 — to — ལྕགས་ཕོ་ཁྱི་ལོ་ (male Iron-Dog); 1917 or 1536 or 764

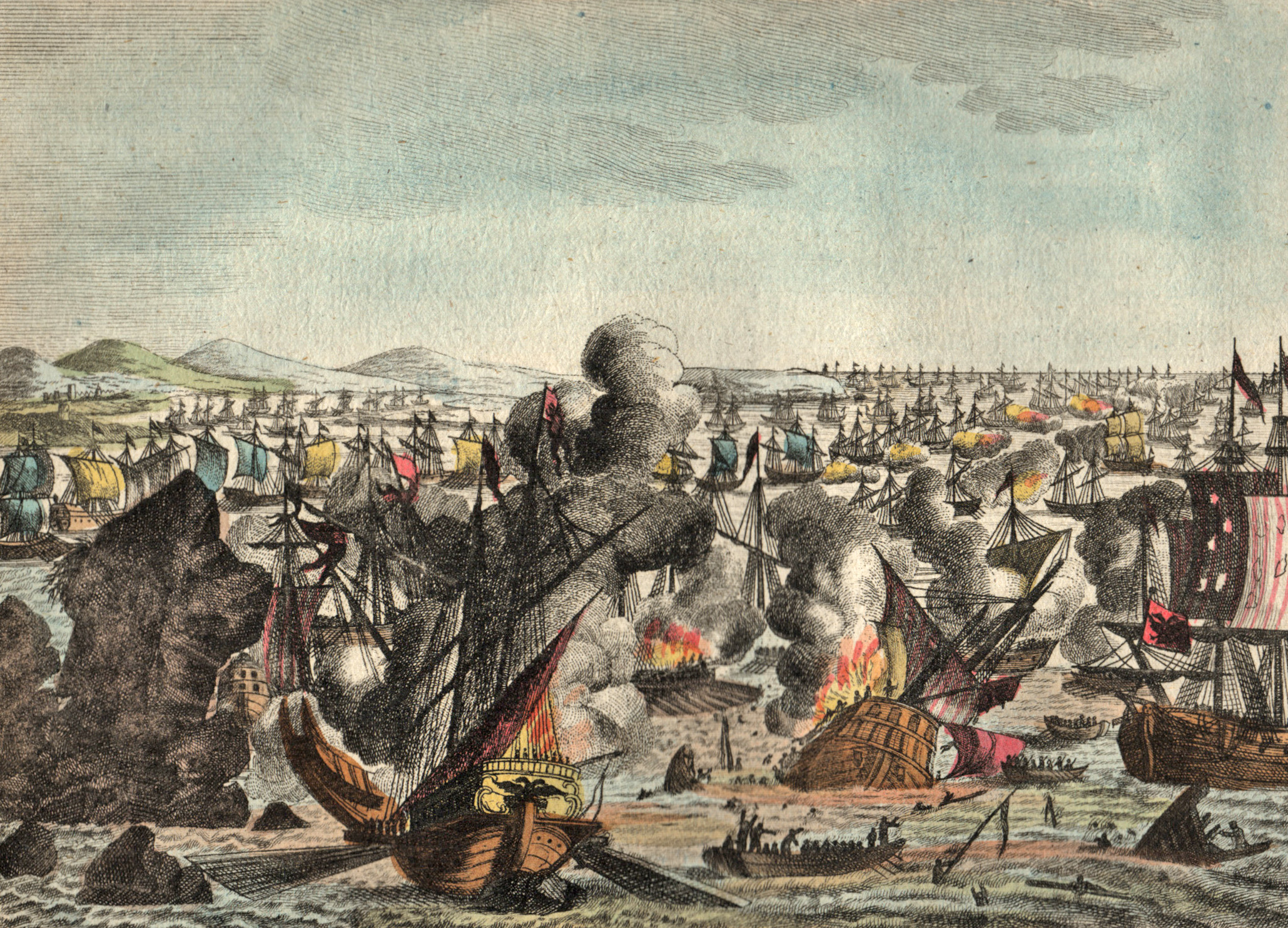
July 9: One-third of Russia's Navy is sunk by Swedish Navy in Battle of Svenskund.

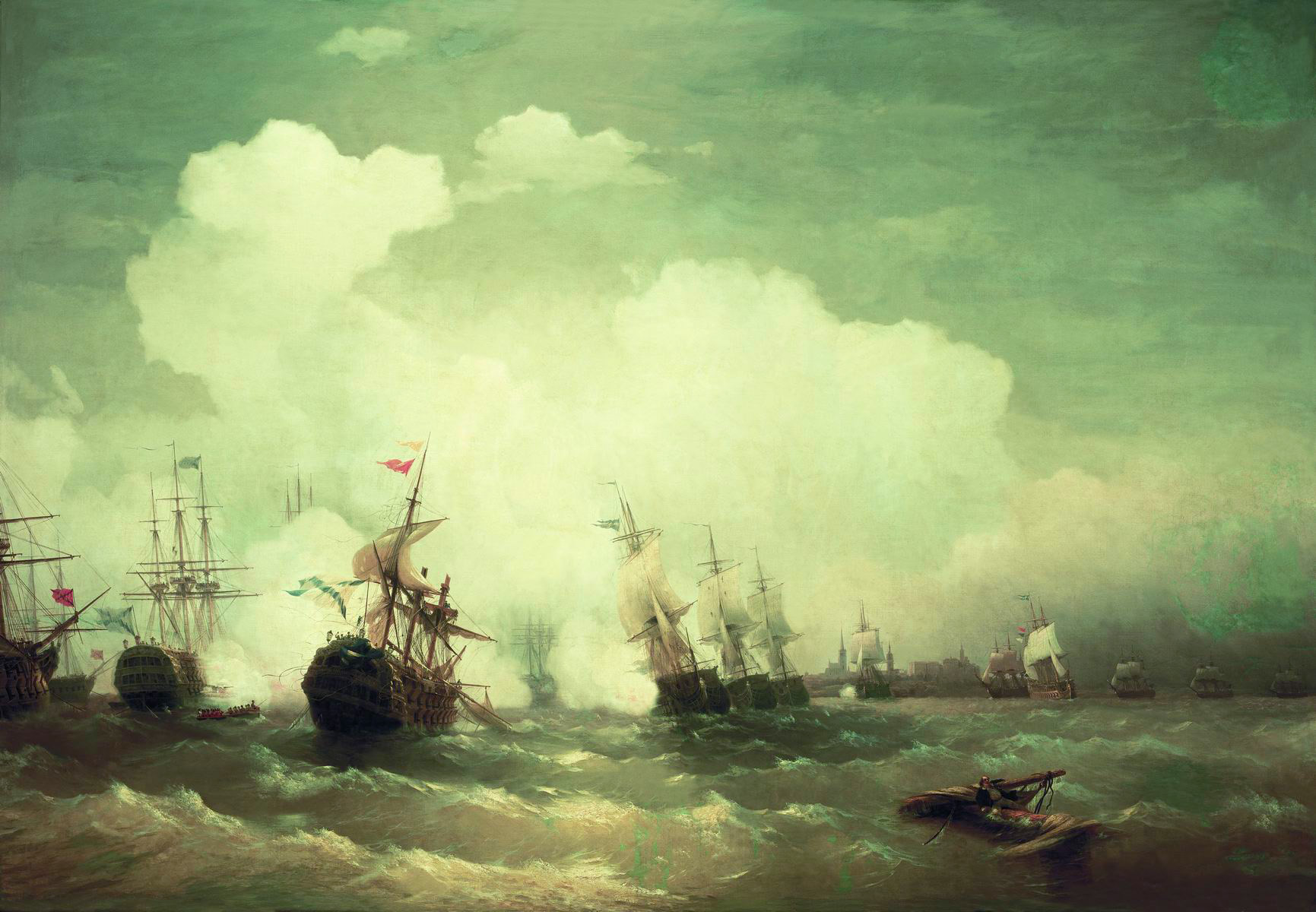
May 13: Battle of Reval

1790 (MDCCXC) was a common year starting on Friday of the Gregorian calendar and a common year starting on Tuesday of the Julian calendar, the 1790th year of the Common Era (CE) and Anno Domini (AD) designations, the 790th year of the 2nd millennium, the 90th year of the 18th century, and the 1st year of the 1790s decade. As of the start of 1790, the Gregorian calendar was 11 days ahead of the Julian calendar, which remained in localized use until 1923.

== Events ==
=== January–March ===
- January 8 – United States President George Washington gives the first State of the Union address, in New York City.
- January 11 – The 11 minor states of the Austrian Netherlands, which took part in the Brabant Revolution at the end of 1789, sign a Treaty of Union, creating the United States of Belgium.
- January 14 – U.S. Secretary of the Treasury Alexander Hamilton submits his proposed plan for payment of American debts, starting with $12,000,000 to pay the foreign debts of the confederation, followed by $40 million for domestic debts, and $21.5 million for the war debts of the states. The plan is narrowly approved 14-12 in the Senate, and 34-28 in the House.
- January 15 – Fletcher Christian & 8 mutineers aboard the Bounty land on Pitcairn.
- January 26 – Mozart's opera Così fan tutte premieres in Vienna.
- January 30
  - The first boat specialized as a rescue lifeboat is tested on the River Tyne in England.
  - Olowalu Massacre: American Captain Simon Metcalfe opens fire with cannon towards villagers in canoes, killing about one hundred Hawaiians, and wounding many others.
- February 1 – In New York City, the Supreme Court of the United States convenes for the first time.
- February 4 – King Louis XVI declares to the French National Assembly that he will maintain the constitutional laws.
- February 11 – Two Quaker delegates petition the United States Congress for the abolition of slavery.
- February 25 – North Carolina cedes its western territories (modern day Tennessee) to the federal government.
- March 1 – The first United States Census is authorized; it is held later in the year.
- March 4 – France is divided into 83 départements, which cut across the former provinces, in an attempt to dislodge regional loyalties based on noble ownership of land.
- March 6 – The New York legislature consents to the admission to the Union of a new state, Vermont, formed within the boundaries of New York, contingent upon the successful conclusion of negotiations concerning disputed real-estate claims, and the boundary between the two states.
- March 21 – Thomas Jefferson reports to President George Washington in New York, as the new United States Secretary of State.

=== April–June ===
- April 10 – The United States patent system is established.
- May 13 – Battle of Reval: Gustav III of Sweden sends the battlefleet to eliminate the Russian squadron wintering at Reval (Estonia), but is defeated; 8 Russians, 130 Swedes are killed, up to 520 captured, 1 ship is burnt, another captured.
- May 17–18 – Battle of Andros: An Ottoman–Algerian fleet destroys the fleet of the Greek privateer Lambros Katsonis.
- May 26 – Congress passes an act to govern the creation of states from the "Southwest Territory", from which Tennessee, Alabama, and Mississippi will be formed.
- May 29 – Rhode Island ratifies the United States Constitution, and becomes the last of the 13 original states to do so.
- June 9 – Royal assent is given to establishment of the port of Milford Haven in Wales.
- June 20 – Compromise of 1790: Thomas Jefferson, James Madison, and Alexander Hamilton come to an agreement: Madison agrees to not be "strenuous" in opposition for the assumption of state debts by the federal government; Hamilton agrees to support the capital site being above the Potomac.
- June 23 – The alleged London Monster is arrested in London; he later receives 40 years for 10 assaults.

=== July–September ===
- July – Louis XVI accepts a constitutional monarchy in France.
- July 9 – Russo-Swedish War – Second Battle of Svensksund: In a massive Baltic Sea battle of 300 ships, the Swedish Navy captures one third of the Russian galley fleet: 304 Swedes are killed, 3,500 Russians killed and 6,000 captured, 51 Russian galleys and other rowing craft are sunk and 22 are taken.
- July 10 — The U.S. House of Representatives votes 32–29 to approve creating the District of Columbia from portions of Maryland and Virginia for the eventual seat of government and national capital.
- July 12 – French Revolution: The Civil Constitution of the Clergy is passed. This completes the destruction of the monastic orders, legislating out of existence all regular and secular chapters for either sex, abbacies and priorships.
- July 14 – French Revolution: Citizens of Paris celebrate the unity of the French people and the national reconciliation, in the Fête de la Fédération.
- July 16 – U.S. President George Washington signs the Residence Act into law, establishing a site along the Potomac River as the District of Columbia and the future site of the capital of the United States. The move comes after the bill is narrowly approved on July 1 by the Senate, 14 to 12, and on July 9 by the House, 32 to 29. At the same time, plans are made to move the national capital from New York to Philadelphia until the Potomac River site can be completed.
- July 26 – Alexander Hamilton's Assumption Bill, giving effect to his First Report on the Public Credit, is passed in the United States Congress, allowing the federal government to assume the consolidated debts of the U.S. states.
- July 27 – The Convention of Reichenbach is signed between Prussia and Austria.
- July 31 – Inventor Samuel Hopkins becomes the first to be issued a U.S. patent (for an improved method of making potash).
- August 4 – A newly passed U.S. tariff act creates the system of cutters for revenue enforcement (later named the United States Revenue Cutter Service), the forerunner of the Coast Guard.
- August 14 – The Treaty of Värälä ends the Russo-Swedish War.
- September 25 – The Peking Opera is born, when the Four Great Anhui Troupes introduce Anhui opera to Beijing, in honor of the Qianlong Emperor's 80th birthday.
- September 30 – Leopold II, Holy Roman Emperor starts to rule.

=== October–December ===
- October 7–22 – The Harmar Campaign ends in a defeat of U.S. Army General Josiah Harmar and Colonel John Hardin by the Western Confederacy of Indians, led by Chief Little Turtle or Mihšihkinaahkwa of the Miami tribe and Blue Jacket or Weyapiersenwah of the Shawnee at Kekionga (now Fort Wayne, Indiana).
- October 7 – Commissioners appointed by the New York legislature announce the successful conclusion of negotiations between New York and Vermont, concerning disputed real-estate claims, and the consent of New York's legislature to the admission to the Union of the state of Vermont as the 14th State (which was formed within what New York claimed as its territory, under an Order in Council, that King George III issued on July 20, 1764).
- October 10 – At least 3,000 people die in Algeria when an earthquake and tsunami strikes the city of Oran. The city is destroyed and Spanish forces eventually flee in 1792.
- October–December – Vincent Ogé leads a rebellion of freed blacks in Saint-Domingue. The rebellion is suppressed and Ogé executed.
- November 27 – France's Constituent Assembly passes a law requiring all Roman Catholic priests to swear an oath of acceptance of the new French Constitution.
- November 27 – U.S. President George Washington and his wife, Martha Washington, arrive in the new temporary U.S. capital, Philadelphia, and take up residence at the President's House located at 524 Market Street.
- December 2 – Holy Roman Empire forces recapture Brussels, bringing an end to the short-lived United States of Belgium and restoring the Austrian Netherlands.
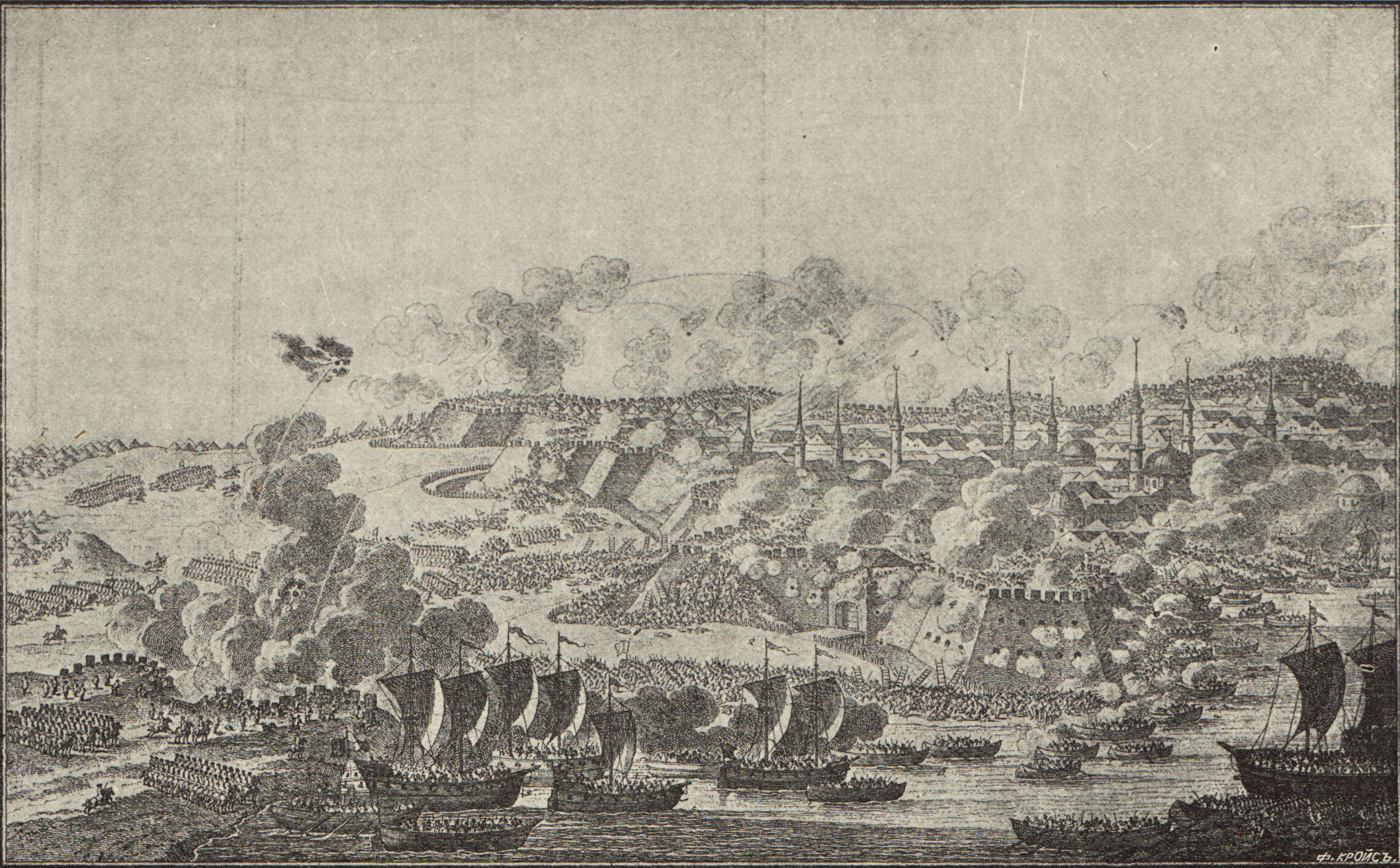
  December 22: Capture of Izmail
- December 6 – The United States Congress opens its first session in the new temporary U.S. capital in Philadelphia.
- December 10 – The Hawkesbury and Nepean Wars begin in New South Wales, Australia, as a result of deterioration in relations and increasing colonization.
- December 17 – The Aztec calendar stone is discovered at El Zócalo, Mexico City.
- December 22 – Russo-Turkish War (1787–92): The Turkish fortress of Izmail is stormed and captured by Alexander Suvorov and his Russian armies. During Suvorov's storm of Izmail, 26,000 Turkish soldiers lose their lives.
- December 26 – Louis XVI gives his public assent to Civil Constitution of the Clergy during the French Revolution.

== Births ==
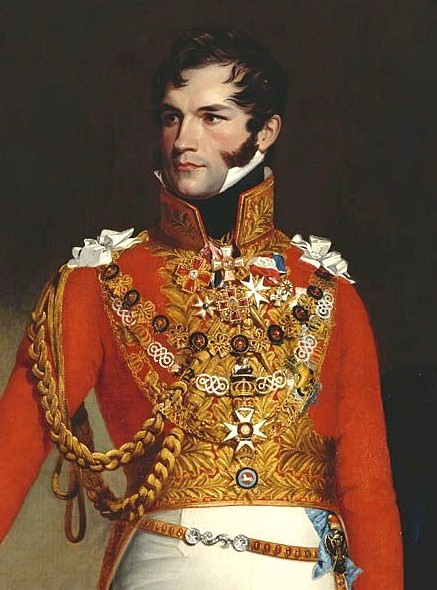
Leopold I of Belgium

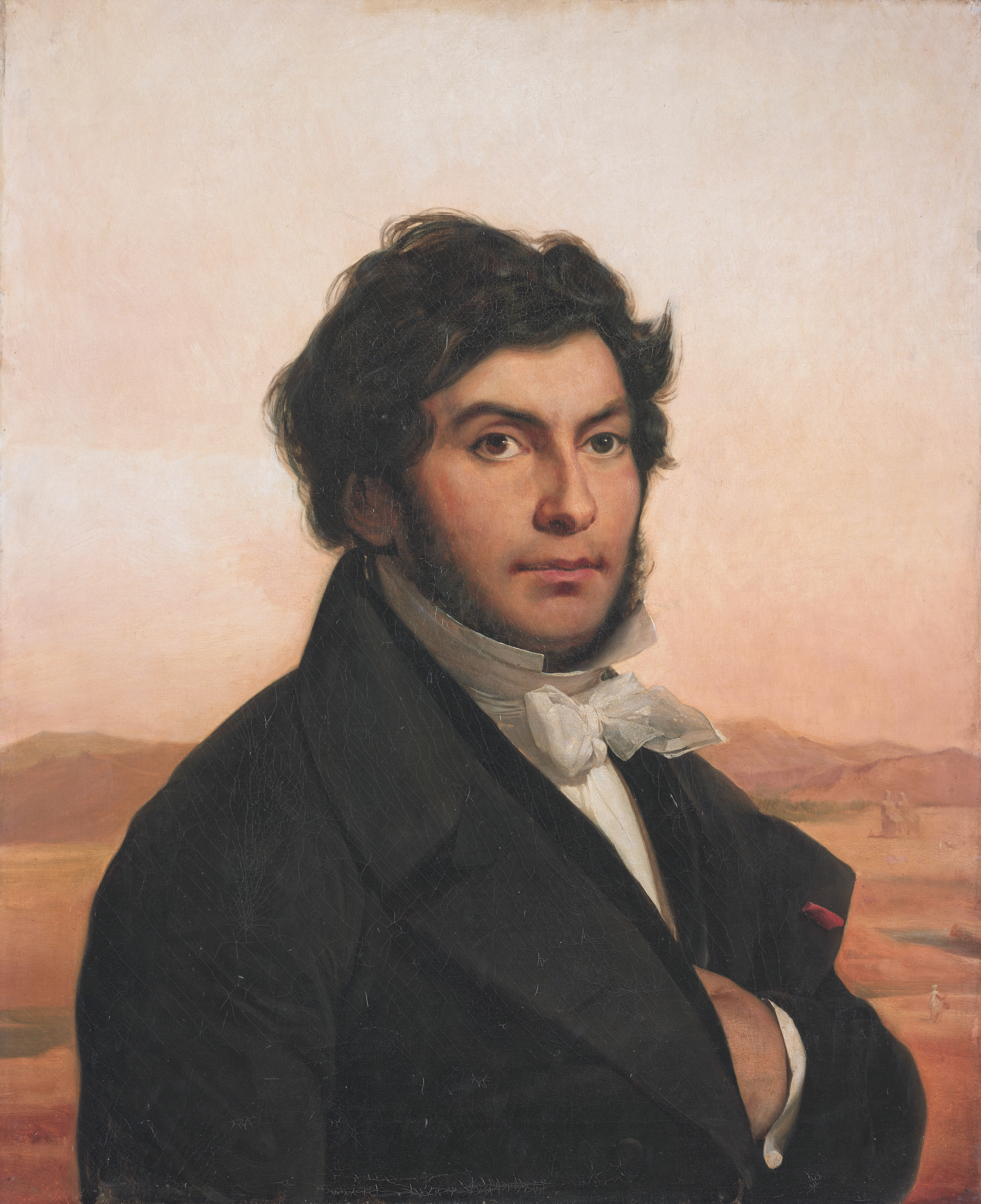
Jean-François Champollion

- January 5 – Melchor Múzquiz, 5th President of Mexico (d. 1844)
- January 18 – Qi Shan, Manchu Qing official (d. 1854)
- January 27 – Juan Álvarez, interim president of Mexico, 1855 (d. 1867)
- February 4 – John Bachman, American minister, social activist and naturalist (d. 1874)
- March 3 – John Austin, English jurist (d. 1859)
- March 29 – John Tyler, tenth President of the United States (d. 1862)
- April 21 – Manuel Blanco Encalada, Spanish-Chilean admiral and politician, 1st President of Chile (d. 1876)
- May 20 – Micajah Thomas Hawkins, American politician (d. 1858)
- May 23 – Jules Dumont d'Urville, French explorer (d. 1842)
- June 1 – Ferdinand Raimund, Austrian playwright (d. 1836)
- June 13 – José Antonio Páez, 19th President of Venezuela (d. 1873)
- June 24 – Helena Ekblom, Swedish preacher (d. 1859)
- July 13 – Anna Sofia Sevelin, Swedish opera singer (d. 1871)
- September 6 – John Green Crosse, English surgeon (d. 1850)
- October 14 – Thursday October Christian I, Pitcairn Islander and son of Fletcher Christian (d. 1831)
- October 21 – Alphonse de Lamartine, French poet and politician
- November 17 – August Ferdinand Möbius, German mathematician, astronomer (d. 1868)
- November 21 – Edmund Lyons, 1st Baron Lyons, British admiral (d. 1858)
- December 8
  - Richard Carlile, English social reformer, press advocate (d. 1843)
  - Friederike Lienig, Latvian entomologist (d. 1855)
  - August Meineke, German Classical scholar (d. 1870)
- December 16 – Leopold I of Belgium (d. 1865)
- December 19 – William Edward Parry, English Arctic explorer (d. 1855)
- December 23 – Jean-François Champollion, French Egyptologist (d. 1832)
- December 31 – Antonie Adamberger, Austrian stage actress (d. 1867)
- date unknown
  - Lone Horn, Miniconjou chief (d. 1875)
  - James Moore Wayne, American politician, Associate Justice of the Supreme Court of the United States (d. 1867)
  - Mohammad Ibrahim Zauq, Urdu poet (d. 1854)

== Deaths ==
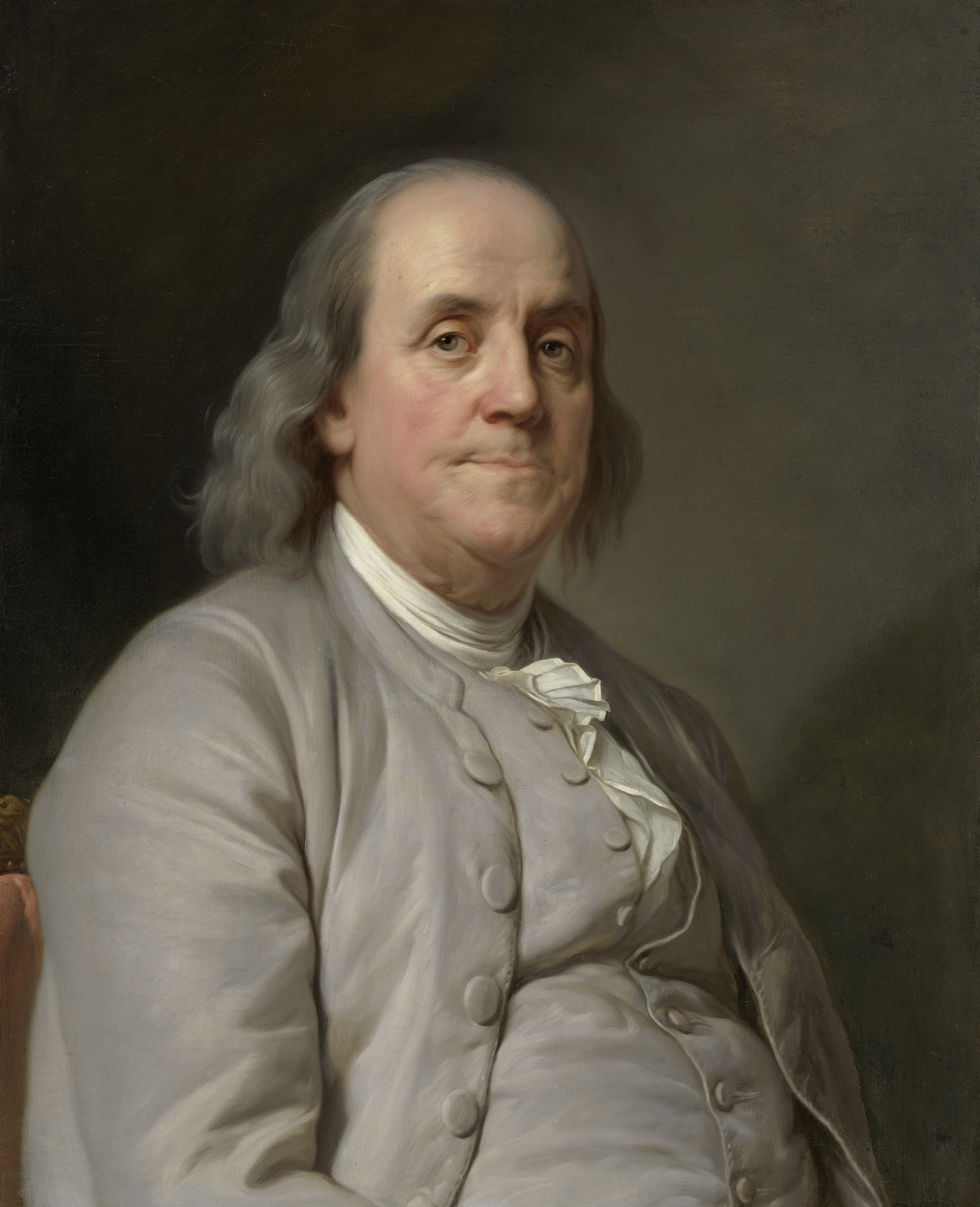
Benjamin Franklin

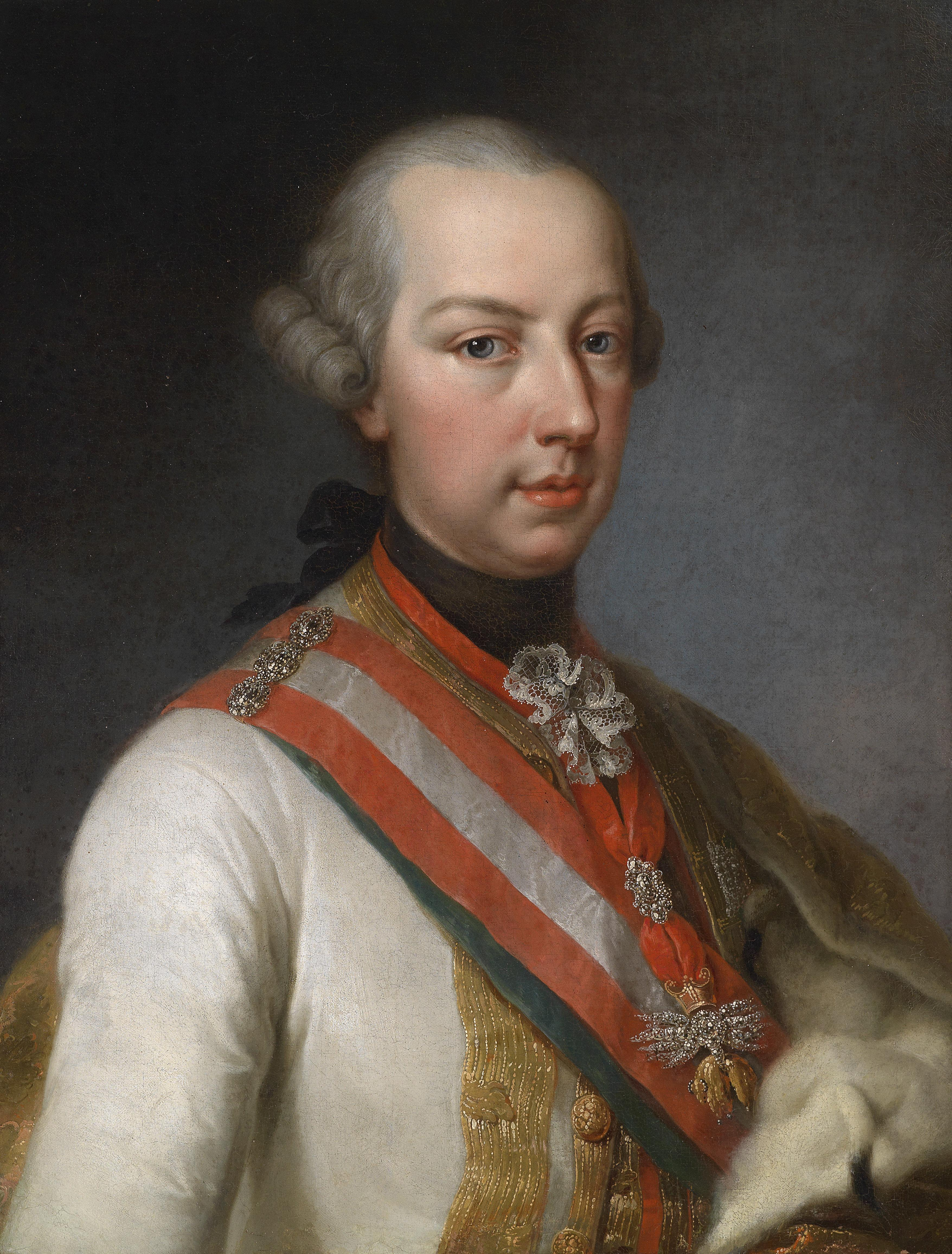
Joseph II, Holy Roman Emperor

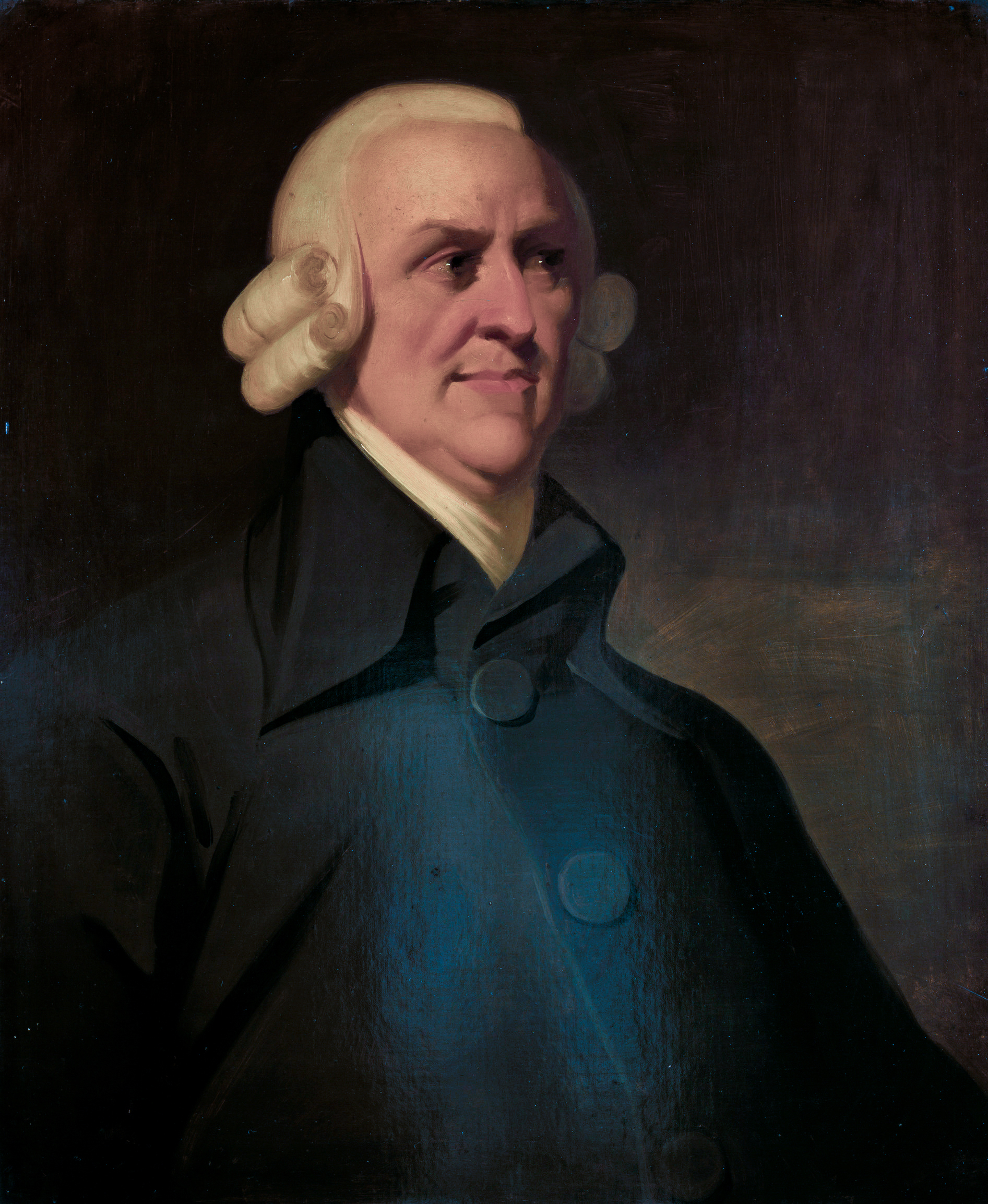
Adam Smith

- January 5 – Jacob Christian Schäffer, German inventor, botanist and professor (b. 1718)
- January 13 – Luc Urbain de Bouëxic, comte de Guichen, French admiral (b. 1712)
- January 15 – John Landen, English mathematician (b. 1719)
- January 20 – John Howard (prison reformer), English philanthropist (b. 1726)
- January 31 – Thomas Lewis, Irish-born Virginia settler (b. 1718)
- February 5 – William Cullen, Scottish physician, chemist (b. 1710)
- February 15– Juan Albano Pereira Márquez, godfather and tutor of Bernardo O'Higgins (b. 1728)
- February 18 – Elisabeth of Württemberg, Archduchess of Austria (b. 1767)
- February 20 – Joseph II, Holy Roman Emperor (b. 1741)
- March 4 – Henry Wisner, American Continental Congressman for New York (b. 1720)
- March 12
  - András Hadik, Austro-Hungarian general (b. 1710)
  - William Grayson, American Continental Congressman and United States Senator for Virginia (b. 1740)
- April 2 – Robert H. Harrison, American jurist and lieutenant colonel of the Continental Army (b. 1745)
- April 6 – Ludwig IX, Landgrave of Hesse-Darmstadt (b. 1719)
- April 17 – Benjamin Franklin, American scientist and statesman (b. 1706)
- April 29 – Charles-Nicolas Cochin, French artist (b. 1715)
- May 16 – Philip Yorke, 2nd Earl of Hardwicke, English politician (b. 1720)
- May 20 – Nathan Miller, American Continental Congressman for Rhode Island (b. 1743)
- May 21 – Thomas Warton, English poet (b. 1728)
- May 23 – George Montagu, 1st Duke of Montagu (b. 1712)
- May 26 – Nathaniel Folsom, American Continental Congressman for New Hampshire and Revolutionary War major general (b. 1726)
- May 29 – Israel Putnam, American Revolutionary War general (b. 1718)
- June 1 – Theodorick Bland, American Continental Congressman and U.S. Representative for Virginia (b. 1741)
- June 25 – Lovisa Augusti, Swedish opera singer (b. 1756)
- July 3 – Jean-Baptiste L. Romé de l'Isle, French chemist (b. 1736)
- July 6 – George Augustus Eliott, 1st Baron Heathfield, British army officer (b. 1717)
- July 7 – François Hemsterhuis, Dutch philosopher (b. 1721)
- July 14 – Ernst Gideon von Laudon, Austrian field marshal (b. 1717)
- July 17 – Adam Smith, Scottish economist, philosopher (b. 1723)
- July 25
  - Johann Bernhard Basedow, German educational reformer (b. 1723)
  - William Livingston, Governor of New Jersey (1776–1790) (b. 1723)
- August 16 – David Brearley, American Revolutionary War colonel, signer of the U.S. Constitution for New Jersey, and federal judge (b. 1745)
- September 2 – Johann Nikolaus von Hontheim, German historian, theologian (b. 1701)
- September 28 – Nikolaus I, Prince Esterházy, Hungarian prince (b. 1714)
- October 7 – Antoine Choquet de Lindu, French architect (b. 1712)
- October 14 – William Hooper, American signer of the Declaration of Independence and Continental Congressman for North Carolina (b. 1742)
- October 19 – Lyman Hall, American signer of the Declaration of Independence and Governor of Georgia (1783–1784) (b. 1724)
- November 2 – Lambert Krahe, German artist (b. 1712)
- November 6 – James Bowdoin, American Governor of Massachusetts (b. 1726)
- November 16 – Daniel of St. Thomas Jenifer, American Continental Congressman and Signer of the U.S. Constitution for Maryland (b. 1723)
- November 24 – Sir Hew Dalrymple, 2nd Baronet, Scottish politician and MP for Haddington Burghs on two occasions (b. 1712)
- December 16 – Benjamin Andrew, American Continental Congressman for Georgia and member of the Georgia House of Representatives (b. 1713)
- December 27/28 – Alvise Foscari, Venetian admiral (b. 1724)
- December 29 – Maria Teresa Cybo-Malaspina, Duchess of Massa, Italian ruler (b. 1725)
- date unknown
  - Helen Gloag, Scottish slave, Empress of Morocco (b. 1750)
  - Susanna Passavant, English luxury goods retailer (b. 1711)
