= Maria Daskalogianni =

Greek fighter

Maria Daskalogianni (Greek: Μαρία Δασκαλογιάννη) was a fighter in the Greek revolution of 1770 and the Greek War of Independence.

She came from the Anopolis village in Sfakia, and was the daughter of Ioannis Daskalogiannis, leader of the revolutionaries in Sfakia during the revolution of 1770. Her mother was known as Sgouromallini, and her siblings were Nikolaos, Andreas, Eleftheroussa, and Anthousa.

She was captured during the Battle of Anopolis and given as a wife to the Pasha's interpreter, Abdulsamet Pasha. She and her husband then went to Constantinople, where he had a house and property. When her Ottoman husband died, Maria moved to Tinos and became a nun.

When the Greek War of Independence burst out in 1821, she offered all the money to buy a nephew of hers a warship, and support the struggle.

She died in Tinos in 1823, and donated as much property as she had left to Evangelistria of Tinos, since she had no children.

== See also ==
- Stavriana Savvaina
- Manto Mavrogenous
- Laskarina Bouboulina
