= Loutro (island) =

Greek islet in the Libyan Sea

Native name: Λουτρό
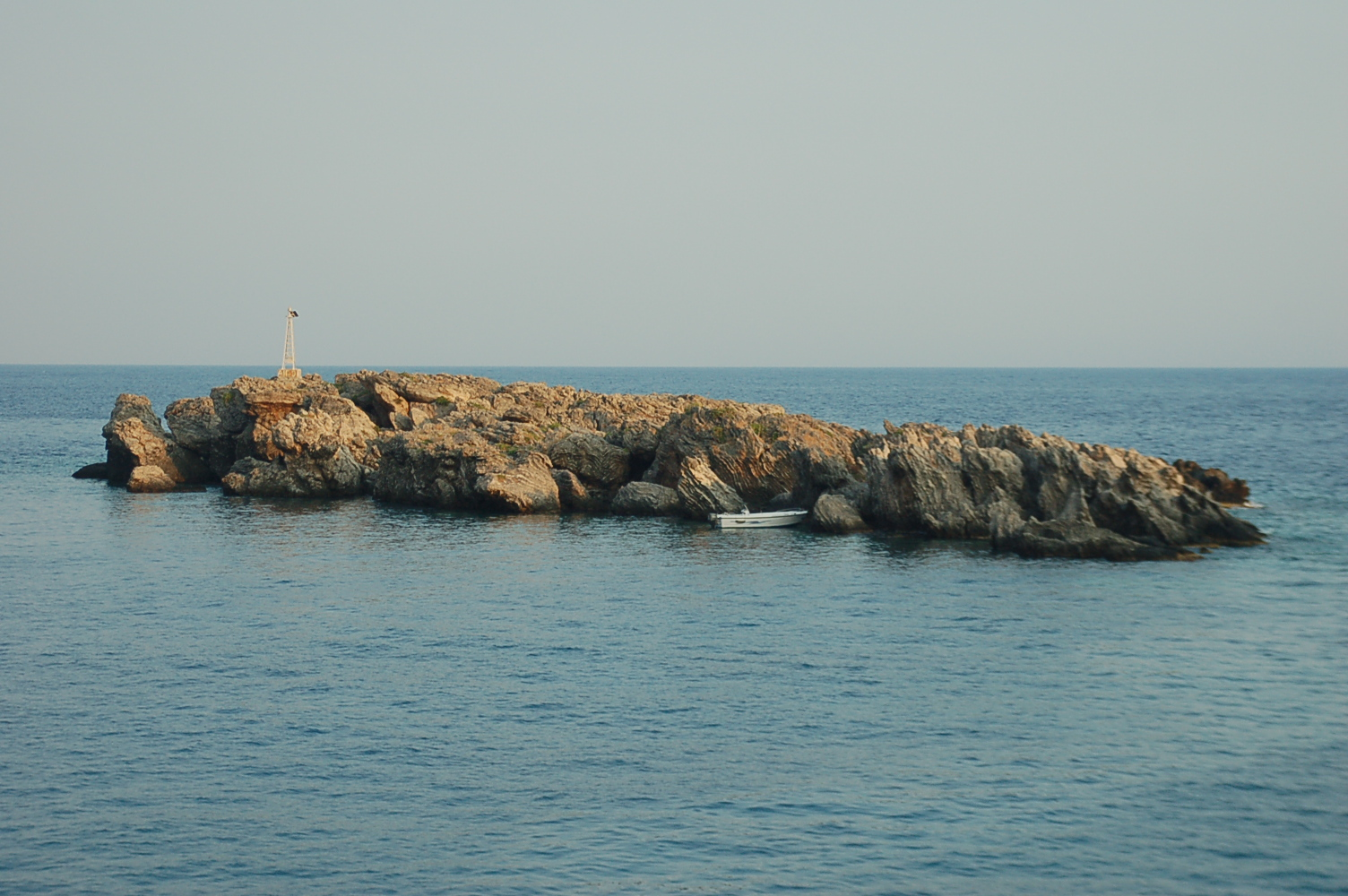
- The rocky islet of Loutro.

- Location within Greece

Geography
- Coordinates: 35.1966°N 24.0827°E
- Archipelago: Cretan Islands

Administration
- Greece
- Region: Crete
- Regional unit: Chania

Demographics
- Population: 0 (2001)

Loutro (Greek: Λουτρό) is a rocky islet in the gulf of Loutro on the southwest coast of Crete in the Libyan Sea. The islet can be found close to the end of the Mouri cape. Administratively, it is part of the municipality of Sfakia. The coastal village of Loutro is approximately 71 kilometres (44 miles) south of Chania. The gulf of Loutro was once used for shipbuilding and by merchant ships.

== Ancient Foinikas ==
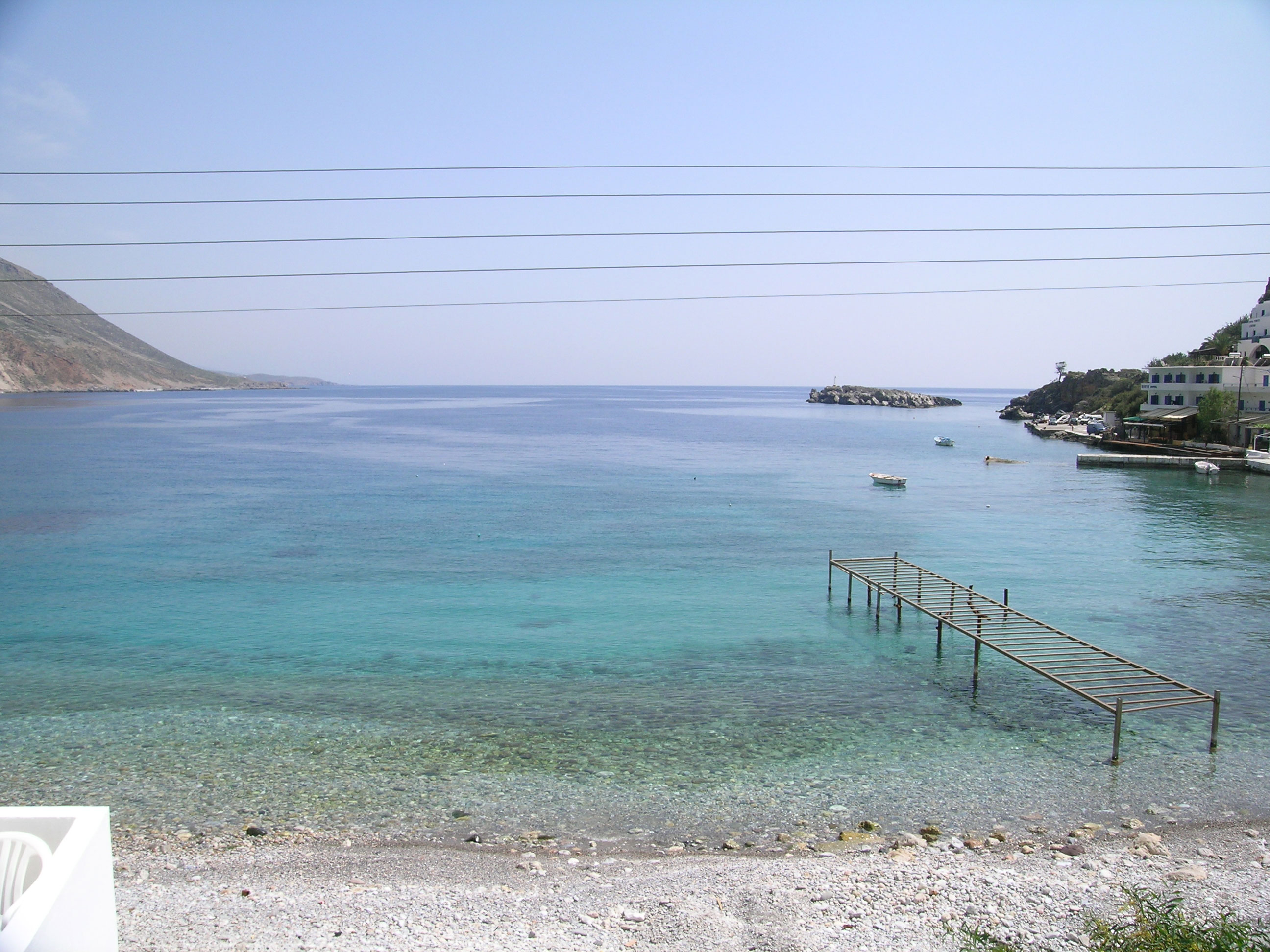
The gulf of Loutro with the islet of Loutro (on the right).

Loutro is believed to be part of ancient Foinikas and the port of ancient Anopolis. It became the winter harbour of Sfakia. The gulf and the islet make a natural harbour where ships can be safe even in the worst of weather.

== Shipbuilding ==
The gulf of Loutro was once used for shipbuilding by the people of Sfakia and the local sailors used to travel throughout the Mediterranean, and as far away as Russia, from Loutro. Shipbuilding, sailing, and navigation contributed to the local economy. One of the successful shipbuilders and shipowners was Ioannis Vlachos, who was better known as Daskalogiannis. He was a wealthy shipbuilder with four large three-mast ships that sailed between the ports of the Mediterranean.

== See also ==
- List of islands of Greece

== Sources ==
- Detorakis, Theocharis (1988). "Η Τουρκοκρατία στην Κρήτη ("Turkish rule in Crete")". In Panagiotakis, Nikolaos M. (ed.). Crete, History and Civilization (in Greek). Vol. II. Vikelea Library, Association of Regional Associations of Regional Municipalities. pp. 333–436.
