= House of Deminoj-Cachoni =

- Дом Деминой-Качони (Russian)
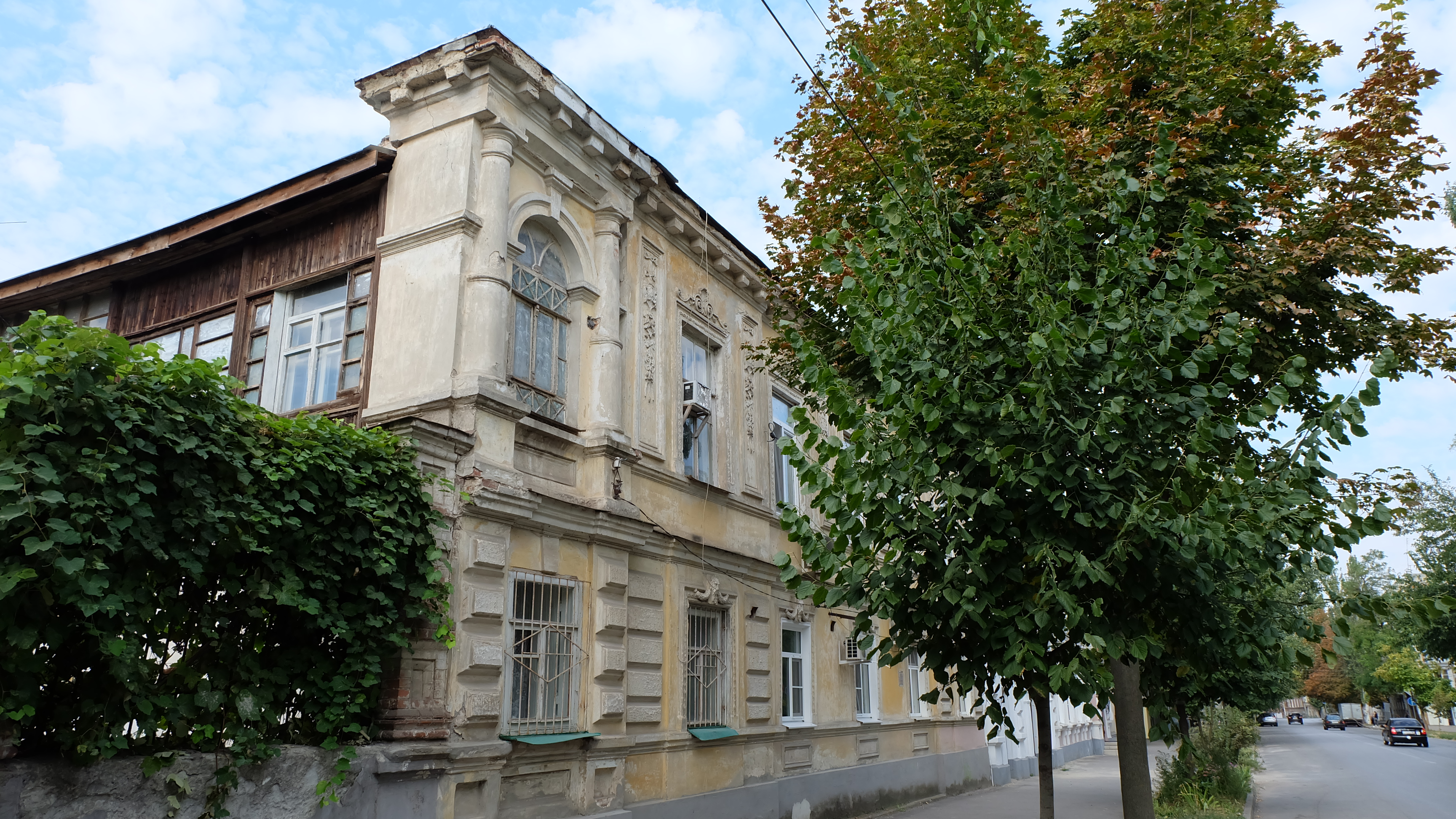
- Interactive map of the House of Deminoj-Cachoni area

General information
- Location: Taganrog, Grecheskaya Street, 47
- Coordinates: 47°12′34″N 38°56′26″E
- Completed: 1860

The House of Deminoj-Cachoni (Russian: Дом Деминой-Качони) is an object of cultural heritage of regional value which settles down the street Greek, 47 in the city of Taganrog of the Rostov Oblast. The structure received the name on the surnames of two most famous owners – Margarita Cachoni (according to other data the surname was read as Kachin) and Aleksandra Dyomina.

== History and description ==
The house in Greek Street (No. 47 in Taganrog) was built in brick style in the 1860s. Margarita Cachoni – the widow of the hero of the Black Sea Fleet in the second Turkish war was his first owner. Her husband is Alexander Likurgovich Cachoni had Lambros Cachoni's grandson. In 1906 the house was got by the wife of the nobleman Alexander Vasilyev Dyomin owning it according to one data to 1915 on others – 1925. In 1926 in a household the comprehensive school for the Poles living in Taganrog worked. Occupations in educational institution began on 27 September. Since 1992 the house is recognized as a monument of architecture and is protected as an object of cultural heritage.

From Grecheskaya Street there is a view of the two houses at this address. The first – two-storeys – is recognized as a historical and cultural monument. His facade decorates a modeled vegetable ornament, Sandvik, panels, and capstones. The second – one-story – is in a typical domestic style of the mid-19th century. It is decorated by a figured pediment, Sandvik, rustovanny shovels and modillions.

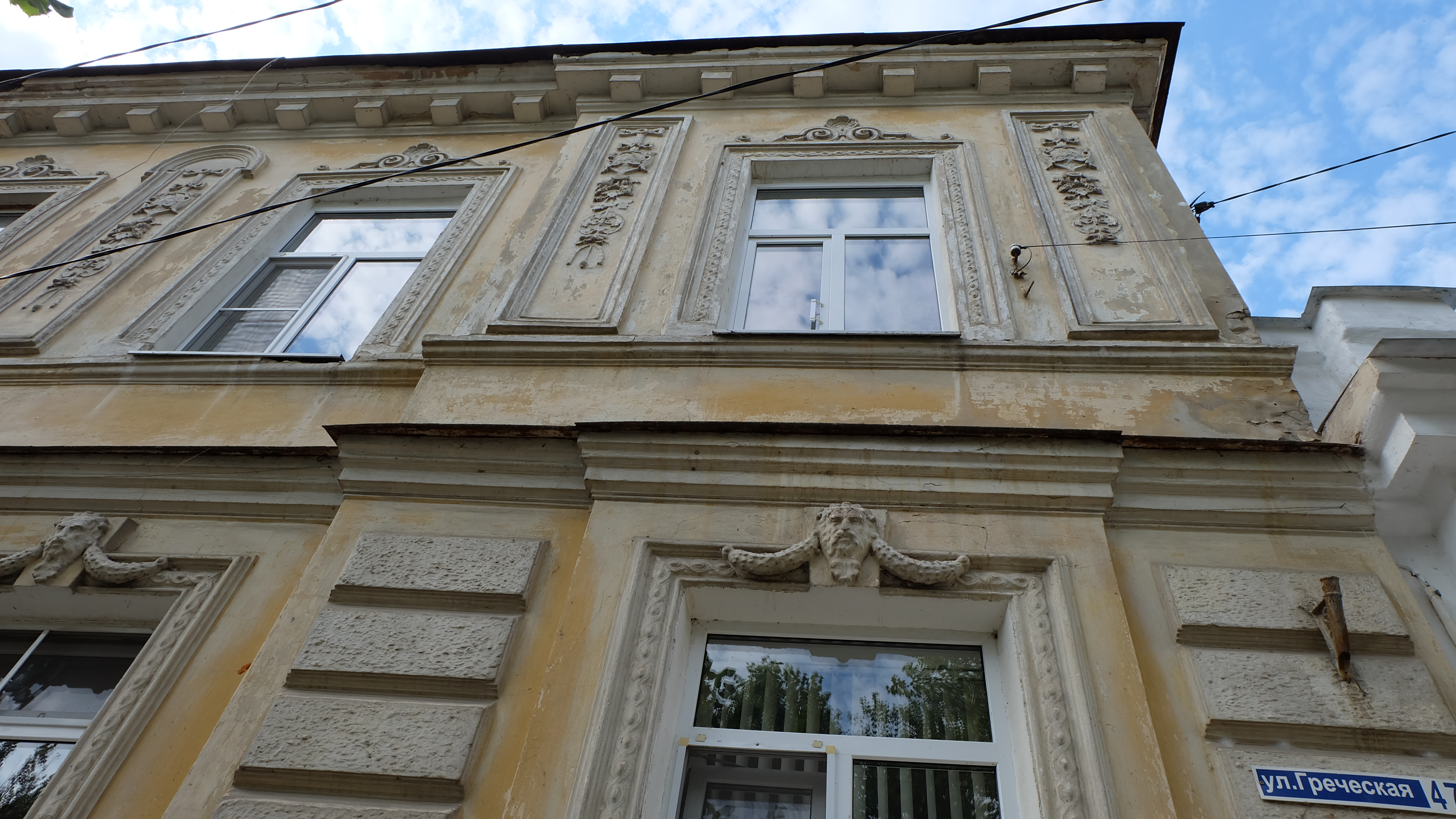

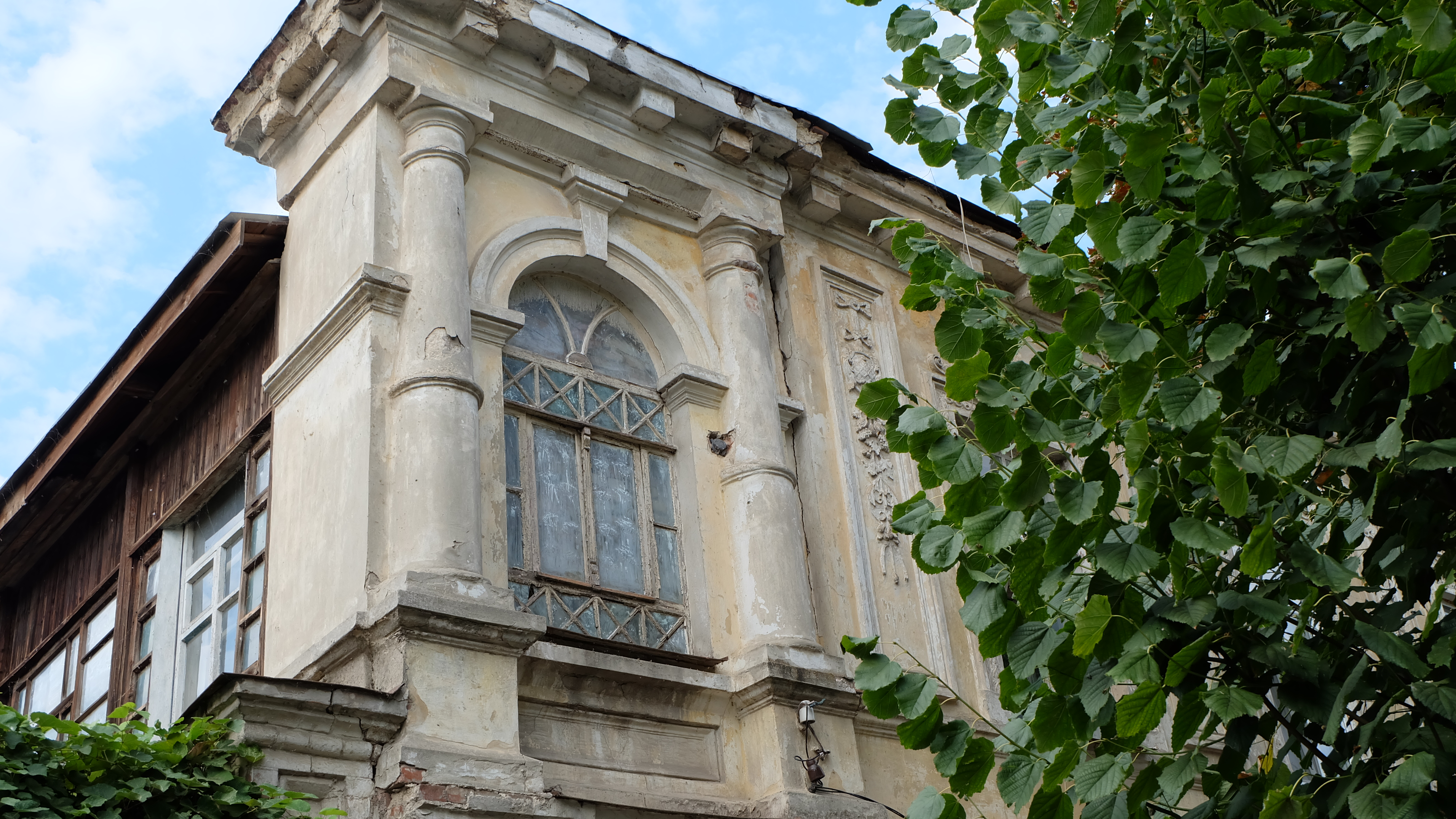
