= Battle of Andros (1790) =

Naval battle of the Russo-Turkish War (1787–1792)

Coordinates: 38°00′N 24°39′E

- Part of the Russo-Turkish War of 1787–1792
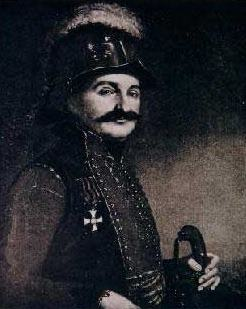
- Painting of Katsonis
Date	17–18 May 1790
Location	Strait between Andros and Cape Kafireas
Result	Ottoman–Algerian victory

Belligerents
Russian Empire	Ottoman Empire; Regency of Algiers

Commanders and leaders
Lambros Katsonis (WIA)	Sai'd Ali

Strength
7 or 9 vessels	19 Ottoman ships 11–13 Algerian xebecs

Casualties and losses
Five ships destroyed, one captured; 565 dead and 53 wounded; several dozen captured and executed	Over 3,000 killed or wounded

The Battle of Andros or Battle of Kafireas was fought on 17–18 May 1790, during the Russo-Turkish War of 1787–1792, between Cape Kafireas and the island of Andros, between the ships of Lambros Katsonis, a Greek privateer in Imperial Russian service, and an Algerian fleet of 30–32 vessels. The battle was a major victory for the Ottomans, as Katsonis lost five ships and his flotilla ceased to exist as an operational unit. On the other hand, the Ottomans suffered heavy casualties as well, and Katsonis was able to escape and reconstitute his forces, remaining active until the end of the war.

== Background ==
Katsonis had participated in the Orlov revolt of 1770, and then entered the service of the Russian Empire under Catherine the Great, reaching the rank of Major. Following the outbreak of the Russo-Turkish War of 1787–1792, in spring 1789 he went to Trieste and recruited Greek crews and ships, forming a fleet to operate Ottoman shipping in the Ionian and Aegean Seas. On his arrival in the Aegean in summer 1789, Katsonis seized, garrisoned, and fortified the island of Kea as a base. From there Katsonis led numerous raids against Ottoman shipping in the northern Aegean, from the Chalcidice to the Dardanelles, and even engaged in a short but eventful blockade of the Dardanelles Straits. Katsonis was an aggressive commander, and did not hesitate to confront the Ottoman navy whenever possible; in June he defeated a Turkish fleet of 14 vessels between Syros and Mykonos, and in the next month he scored another victory in a battle between Syros and Delos. For his exploits, Catherine promoted him to Lt. Colonel on 24 July 1789.

Katsonis occasionally collaborated with another Russian flotilla of five state-funded and four Greek privateer vessels under the Maltese captain Guglielmo Lorenzo, that also operated in the Aegean. Lorenzo's attempt to subordinate Katsonis to his command was strongly rejected by the latter, who insisted on the independence of his command, and the opportunity for uniting the two fleets to greater effect was lost. Indeed, relations soured to such extent that Katsonis prohibited the islanders from assisting Lorenzo's flotilla, while many of the latter's crewmen defected to Katsonis, lured by the greater salary he gave his men. On the other hand, it cannot be denied, as the Russian historian Yuri Pryakhin remarks, that Katsonis' fleet was far more effective an experienced and that Katsonis himself, as a Greek, had far broader appeal among the Greek populations of the Aegean, who regarded him as a hero. Lorenzo, on the other hand, despite assembling a large fleet of 36 vessels, already in August left the Aegean and returned to Sicily, declining to continue operations against the Ottomans as too risky. Katsonis continued his successful activity, defeating a joint Turkish and Algerian fleet off Eleni (Makronisos) on 4 August, so that the Ottoman Porte attempted to bribe him by offering, through the Dragoman of the Fleet, Alexander Mavrogenes, a full pardon, the right to settle with his followers on whichever island he chose, hereditary rule over it, and 200,000 gold coins.

== Return to the Aegean and the battle of Andros ==
In September 1789, Katsonis with his fleet left for the Venetian-ruled Ionian Islands, to repair and replenish his ships. In late August, however, the Ottoman fleet arrived at Kea and sacked the island. The men left behind were killed, and the installations erected razed to the ground. In early spring 1790, after having undertaken repairs to his ships, Katsonis with a fleet of nine vessels returned to the Aegean. Taking on board the klepht Androutsos and his 800 men, he raided Turkish shipping in the Aegean, advancing up to Tenedos in hopes of confronting an Ottoman fleet. On 15 April they arrived at Kea, which they refortified and regarrisoned.

There he received news that an Ottoman squadron of nineteen vessels, including frigates and ships of the line, had exited the Dardanelles with explicit orders from the new Sultan, Selim III, to hunt him down and destroy him. Katsonis sailed forth to meet it, but adverse winds delayed his progress, and on 17 May his fleet encountered the Ottoman squadron in the straits between Cape Kafireas of Euboea and the island of Andros. Sources variously report that Katsonis disposed of nine ships or seven ships; the discrepancy is explained by Katsonis' Greek biographer P. Magiakos in his 1930 work by the fact that two of the originally nine vessels were unable to participate in the battle due to adverse winds.

The two fleets began their engagement near noon of 17 May, and the battle raged the entire day. The fight was initially in favour of the Greeks, but at night the wind fell, and Katsonis' ships were unable to disengage. Early in the morning of the next day, an Algerian squadron (11 ships according to Pryakhin, 12 according to Magiakos, and 13 according to a recently discovered letter by one of Katsonis' crewmen) of 32-gunand 36-gun xebecs came to the Ottomans' aid. Magiakos further reports that the Algerians were informed by the Spetsiot Anargyros Hatzianargyros, cousin of an officer in Katsonis' fleet, who as a reward was then appointed bey of Spetses.

The Greek flotilla was now in a critical position, attacked from two sides by over thirty much heavier ships. As the Greeks began running low on ammunition, they reduced their rate of fire. Katsonis' ships were now exposed to withering fire, their superstructures riddled with holes and with many officers dead, and their opponents moved to board their ships and take them by assault. The 24-gun brig Maria, under Paschalis Kasimis, was rammed and captured by boarding. Four vessels were destroyed, one of which, commanded by Dimitris Alexopoulos, was blown up by its captain to avoid being captured. The ship Achilleus, although heavily damaged, managed to escape the battle. Katsonis' own flagship, the Athena of the North, was boarded but managed to fight off the attack. By nightfall, however, only 60 of its 295-strong crew were still alive, and most of the survivors, including Katsonis himself, were heavily wounded. The ship was almost shot to pieces, and most of its artillery was destroyed or inoperable. Katsonis managed to steer his vessel into the harbour of Kea, where he was blockaded by the Ottoman fleet. In the end Katsonis was forced to put his own ship to the torch, and barely managed to escape, with a few close comrades, on a skiff between the Ottoman ships.

The battle ended with Katsonis' fleet having lost 565 dead and 53 wounded and captured, while Katsonis with his remaining two vessels withdrew to the Venetian-ruled island of Kythira. The Ottoman and Algerian losses were also heavy, reportedly some 3,000 men killed and many wounded. Many vessels had to be towed home, and according to some reports a few sank on the way. Nevertheless, Katsonis' fleet was destroyed as an effective force.

The Ottoman–Algerian fleet received a triumphant welcome at Constantinople. Yegor Palatino, a captain of the Life Guards Grenadier Regiment, who had recently joined the fleet and was taken prisoner, reported that 17 of the prisoners were publicly hung before the fleet, six decapitated in front of the Sultan himself, and on the next day, a further 21 were killed. Palatino himself was saved from execution only because he was known to the serasker, having been employed by Katsonis as a courier to the Ottomans before. Other crewmen of Katsonis, who managed to reach nearby Andros, were hunted down by the Algerians and even some of the local inhabitants for the bounty placed on them and executed. Others, including the future admiral of the Greek War of Independence Nikolis Apostolis, were sheltered by the locals and smuggled off by fishermen the island to Kythira. The Ottomans also retook Kea, razing Katsonis' base there, and even hanging the local priest who had officiated at Katsonis' wedding.

== Aftermath ==
With the remaining ships Katsonis fled to the Ionian island of Ithaca, where he managed to reconstitute his forces and recruit more ships. Despite his defeat, he was rewarded by Empress Catherine, on the recommendation of Grigory Potemkin, with promotion to Colonel and the Cross of St. George, 4th Class. Katsonis and his fleet remained active in the Aegean and continued to score successes against Ottoman shipping. By the summer of 1791, Katsonis disposed of 21 ships. In the meantime, however, the Russian victories at Măcin and Kaliakra led to the war's end with the conclusion of an armistice on 11 August 1791, followed by the Treaty of Jassy. Katsonis was ordered to cease operations. Katsonis refused to obey and gathered his ships at Porto Kagio near Cape Tainaron, but was attacked there by a joint Ottoman–French fleet and his fleet was annihilated. Katsonis himself managed to escape to Russia with a few of his followers, settling at Livadiya in the Crimea.

== Sources ==
- Aspreas, G. (1929). "Κατσώνης Λάμπρος". Μεγάλη Στρατιωτικὴ καὶ Ναυτικὴ Ἐγκυκλοπαιδεία. Tόμος Τέταρτος: Καβάδης–Μωριάς [Great Military and Naval Encyclopaedia. Volume IV: Kavadh–Morea] (in Greek). Athens: Ἔκδοσις Μεγάλης Στρατιωτικῆς καὶ Ναυτικῆς Ἐγκυκλοπαιδείας. pp. 103–104. OCLC 31255024.
- Pryakhin, Yuri D. (2004). Ламброс Кацонис в истории Греции и России [Lambros Katsonis in the history of Greece and Russia] (in Russian). St. Petersburg: Aletheia. ISBN 5-89329-731-8.
- Vakalopoulos, Apostolos (1975). "Η στροφή των Ελλήνων προς τους Ρώσους: Ο Ρωσοτουρκικός πόλεμος του 1787-1792 και οι Έλληνες. Οι αγώνες των Σουλιωτών και η δράση του Λάμπρου Κατσώνη" [The Greeks turn to the Russians: The Russo-Turkish War of 1787–1792 and the Greeks. The struggles of the Souliots and the actions of Lambros Katsonis]. In Christopoulos, Georgios A. & Bastias, Ioannis K. (eds.). Ιστορία του Ελληνικού Έθνους [History of the Greek Nation] (in Greek). Vol. ΙΑ: Ο Ελληνισμός υπό ξένη κυριαρχία (περίοδος 1669 - 1821), Τουρκοκρατία - Λατινοκρατία [Hellenism under Foreign Rule (Period 1669 - 1821), Turkocracy – Latinocracy]. Athens: Ekdotiki Athinon. pp. 85–97. ISBN 978-960-213-100-8.
