= Stavriana Savvaina =

Greek revolutionary (1772–1868)

- Σταυριάνα Σάββαινα
- Born: 1772; Parori, Laconia
- Died: 1868 (aged 95–96); Nafplio
- Spouse: Georgakis Savvas
- Military career
- Allegiance: Kyriakoulis Mavromichalis
- Conflicts: Greek war of independence; Siege of Tripolitsa; Battle of Valtetsi; Ottoman–Egyptian invasion of Mani

Stavriana Savvaina (Greek:Σταυριάνα Σάββαινα; 1772–1868) was a Greek revolutionary who fought during the Greek war of Independence

== Before the war ==
Savvaina was born in 1772 in a Parori a small village in Laconia. she was married to Georgakis Savvas a wealthy dignitary and member of the Philiki Eteria.

== Greek war of Independence ==
In 1821 her husband was hanged in Mystras by the Ottomans. After her husband's death she left her village with her mother-in-law and women from the surrounding villages and made a women's military unit serving under Kyriakoulis Mavromichalis. She and her unit fought in the siege of Tripolitsa. Battle of Valtetsi, battle of Diro and Battle of Verga during the Ottoman–Egyptian invasion of Mani.

== Later life ==
After the war she moved to Nafpilo and she died in 1868.

== See also ==
- Laskarina Bouboulina
- Maria Daskalogianni
- Manto Mavrogenous
