= Greek ship Katsonis =

Four ships of the Hellenic Navy have borne the name Katsonis (Κατσώνης), after the 18th-century naval commander Lambros Katsonis:

- a Town-class light cruiser that was never delivered due to the outbreak of World War I and served in the British Royal Navy as HMS Chester
- Greek submarine Katsonis (Y-1), a French-built boat of the Katsonis class, in service 1927–1943
- Greek submarine Katsonis (S-115), an ex-US GUPPY-IIA boat, in service 1973–1993
- Greek submarine Katsonis (S-123), a Type 214 submarine, in service since 2016
