= Battle of Porto Kagio =

1792 naval battle

- Part of the aftermath of Russo-Turkish War (1787–1792)
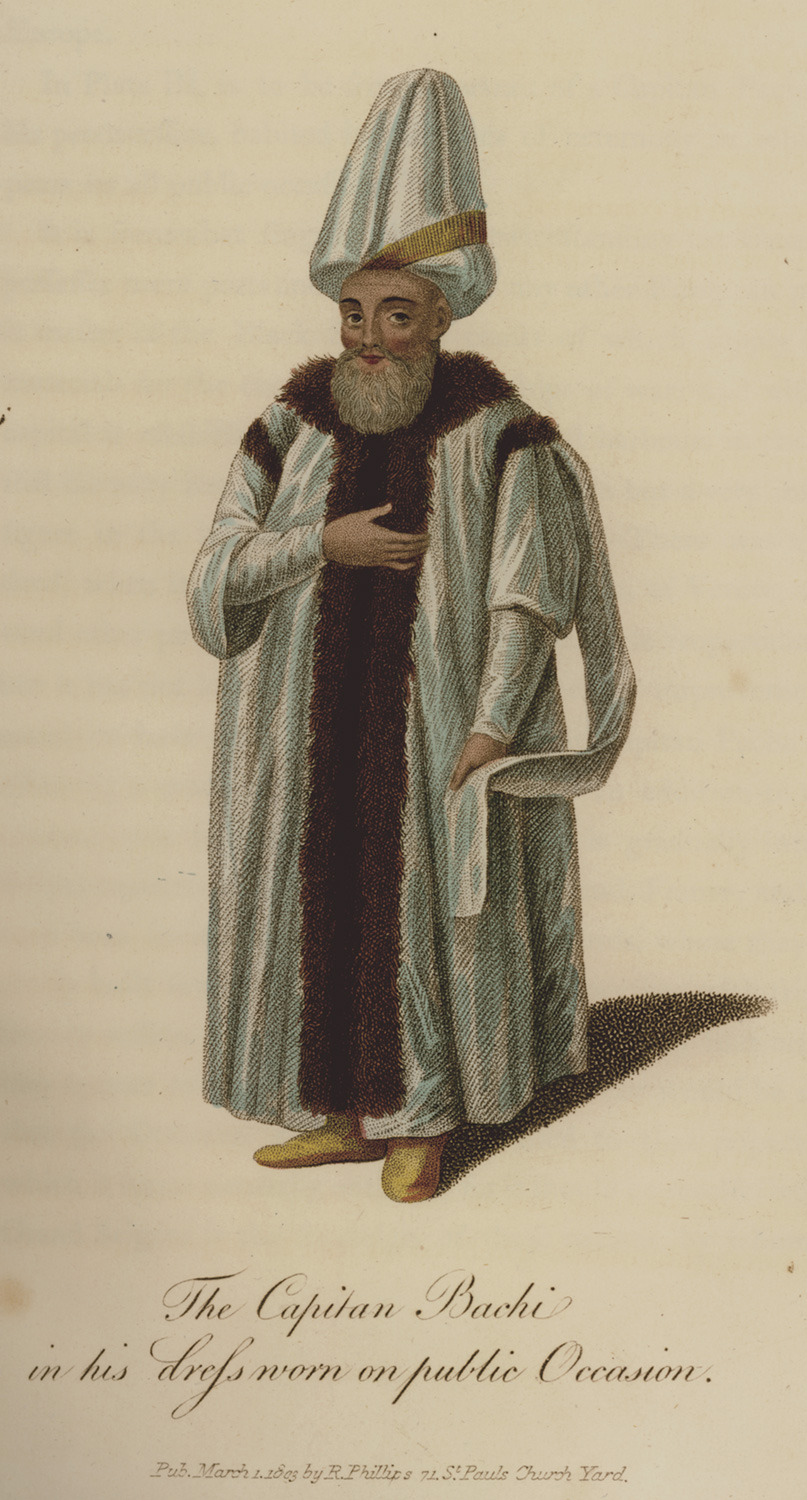
- Küçük Hüseyin Pasha
Date	17–18 June 1792
Location	Porto Kagio, Morea Eyalet, Ottoman Empire
Result	Ottoman victory

Belligerents
Ottoman Empire	Greek pirates

Commanders and leaders
Küçük Hüseyin Pasha	Lambros Katsonis

Strength
10 galleons	16 sailing ships

Casualties and losses
Light	Heavy

The Battle of Porto Kagio was a late 18th century naval engagement. Fought between an Ottoman force and Greek pirates, the battle came in the aftermath of the Russo-Turkish War (1787–1792).

An Ottoman naval force under the command of Kapudan Pasha Küçük Hüseyin Pasha destroyed the Greek fleet under the command of Lambros Katsonis, which was carrying out piracy activities in favor of Russia in the Aegean Sea and Mediterranean off the Porto Kagio in Mani Peninsula.

== Prelude ==
The Russo-Turkish War (1787–1792) ended with the Treaty of Jassy, signed on 10 January 1792; Greek sailor Lambros Katsonis, who carried out piracy activities against the Ottomans in the Mediterranean and Aegean Sea on behalf of Russia throughout the war, continued his activities during peacetime from the base he established in Porto Kagio on the Mani Peninsula, in the south of the Morea Eyalet. The Ottoman Empire asked Russia through diplomatic channels to convince Katsonis to refrain from attacks on the Ottoman navy. Upon receiving the confirmation of peace from Russia and the response that Katsonis was no longer under Russian protection, Sultan Selim III assigned the new Kapudan Pasha Küçük Hüseyin Pasha and Beylerbey of the Morea Eyalet, Mustafa Pasha, to eliminate Katsonis.

Mustafa Pasha advanced on Mani by land and marched onto Porto Kagio. The Ottoman navy under the command of Küçük Hüseyin Pasha, on the other hand, left the Dardanelles on 10 June 1792 and advanced towards Lesbos. While it was around Lesbos, the Ottoman fleet (composed of six ships under the command of Halil Bey, which was sent to the vicinity of Naxos and Paros), caught the fleet of the pirate Karakaçan, under the retinue of Katsonis, at Çamlıca. The next day, after the main Ottoman force arrived to the region, the Greek fleet was destroyed in the Battle of Çamlıca. Then, the Ottoman fleet moved towards Mani Peninsula and anchored at Cinbova Port near Portokale.

== Battle ==
The Ottoman navy headed towards Porto Kagio on 16 June 1792 and blockaded its port as well as the landing of troops. In the ensuing battle on 17 June, the Ottoman navy decisively defeated the Greek fleet, capturing 11 ships and 65 soldiers. The fighting continued until 18 June, and while the Ottoman navy captured the remaining 5 ships, the soldiers who landed destroyed the buildings and fortifications that the Greek pirates had built on the coast and captured 115 cannons of various sizes. Lambros Katsonis, on the other hand, managed to escape in the darkness of the night of 19 June.

== Aftermath ==
Following this victory, the Ottoman Navy under the command of Küçük Hüseyin Pasha entered Istanbul on 25 September 1792, with 18 ships and hundreds of Greek pirates that it had captured. The victory was celebrated with cannon fire the next day. On 29 September, Küçük Hüseyin Pasha was accepted into the presence of Sultan Selim III. Dressed in sable fur, he was presented a dagger inlaid with precious stones.

The diplomatic efforts of the Ottomans to extradite Lambros Katsonis, who was understood to have taken refuge in the Republic of Venice, were unsuccessful.
