= Porto Kagio =

Village and historical site in southern Greece

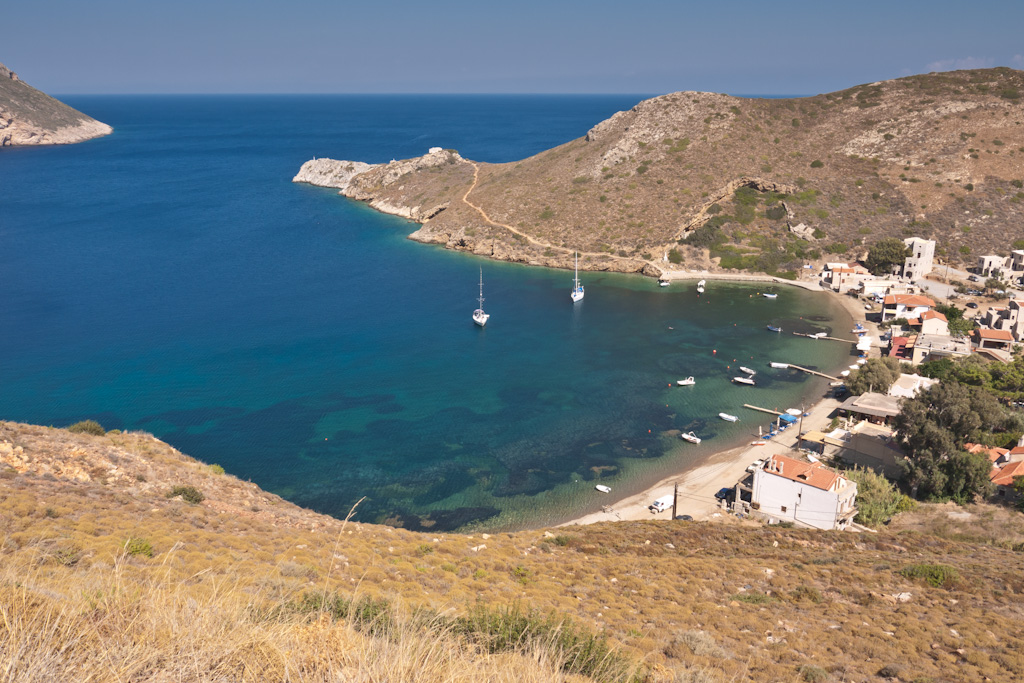
Porto Kagio, Greece

Porto Kagio or Porto Káyio (Greek: Πόρτο Κάγιο) is a seaside village on the eastern side of the Mani Peninsula, in the Peloponnese, Greece. Porto Kagio faces a small bay on the Laconian Gulf, and is about three miles north of Cape Matapan, the southernmost tip of mainland Greece.

Some 17th- and 18th-century maps label the village "Maina"—the historical name for the Mani Peninsula—and some authors consider Porto Kagio a possible location for the castle of Grand Magne; medieval portolans mention no such castle there.

== History ==
Porto Kagio is located near the site of the ancient port of Psamathous. Its name derives from the Venetian Porto Quaglio and the French Port des Cailles (Quail Port).

Greece was absorbed into the Ottoman Empire in the 15th century. To protect the vital harbor of Porto Kagio in their long series of wars with the Republic of Venice, the Ottomans built a castle there in c. 1568, which they used as a base for galleys patrolling the Kythera Channel. The Venetians attacked the castle in 1570; the Ottomans surrendered and abandoned the castle. In 1670, the Ottomans returned and built a new fortress. The Ottomans were driven out in 1770 during the Orlov Revolt.

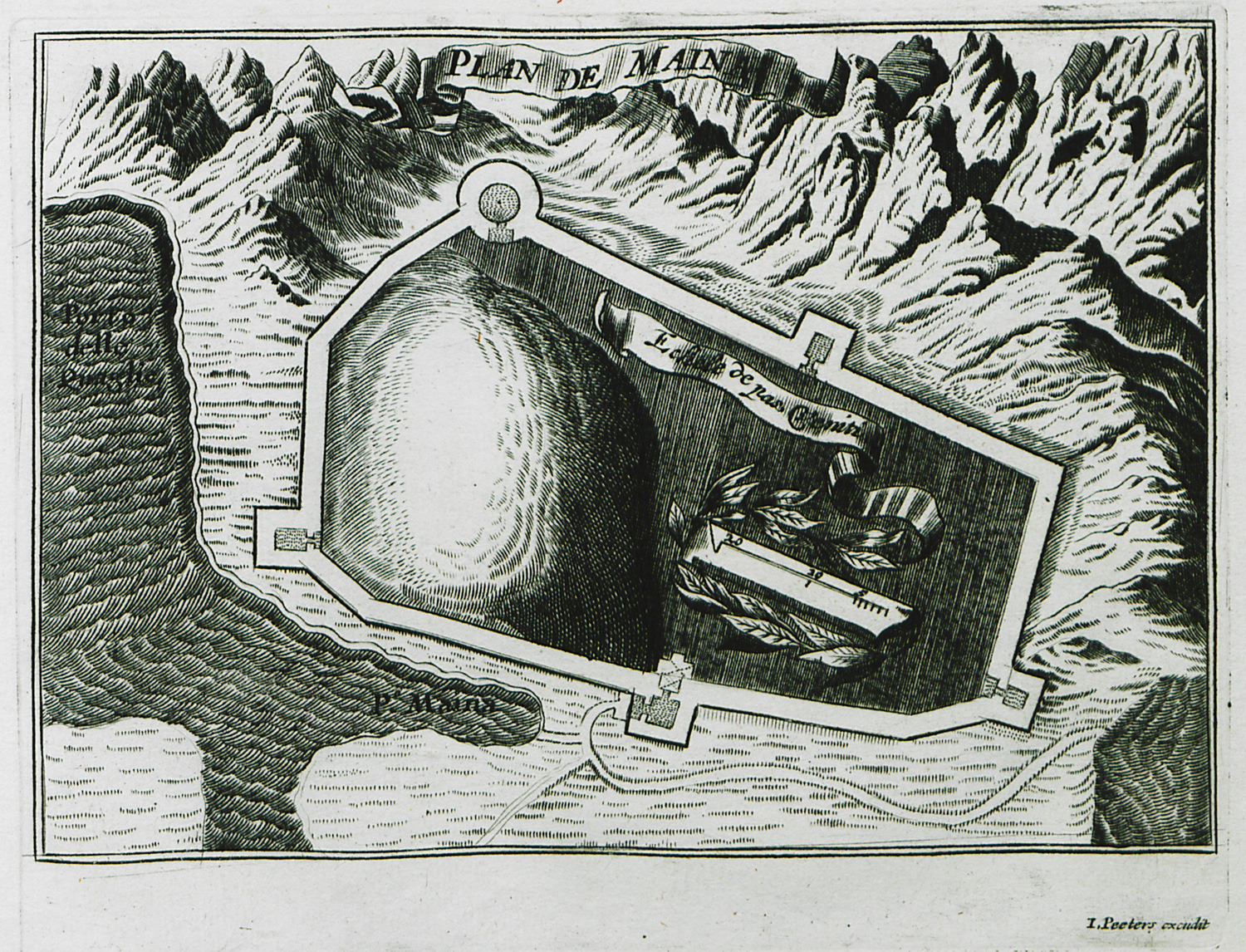
The Ottoman castle at Porto Kagio, c. 1690

In the late 18th century, Porto Kagio was the base of Lambros Katsonis's pirate fleet. In 1792, the Ottomans destroyed Katsonis's fleet in the Battle of Porto Kagio.

In World War II, the armies of Nazi Germany and Fascist Italy invaded Greece from the north; the Axis occupation of Greece followed the invasions. British soldiers stationed in the Peloponnese, evacuated to British Egypt from Porto Kagio ahead of the advancing armies.

== Administration and economy ==
Porto Kagio has been part of the municipality of East Mani since 2011.

Porto Kagio's main economic activity is tourism. It has four small hotels.
