= Araden (Crete) =

Ancient city-state in Greece

Coordinates: 35°13′30″N 24°03′37″E

Araden (Ancient Greek: Ἀραδήν) was a town and polis (city-state) of ancient Crete. Stephanus of Byzantium claims was Araden later name of, rather than a successor settlement to, Anopolis (Ἀνώπολις)

Its site is located near modern Aradena.
