= Panagiotis Benakis =

Greek revolutionary (c. 1700–1771)

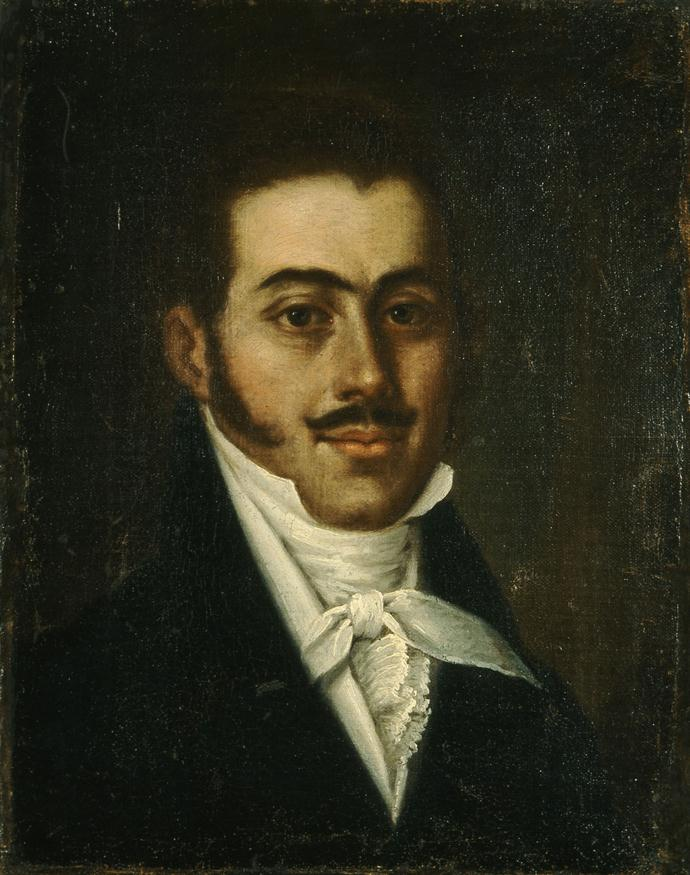
Portrait of Panagiotis Benakis

Panagiotis Benakis (Greek: Παναγιώτης Μπενάκης; c. 1700 – 1771) was a Greek businessman from Kalamata in the 18th century, during the Ottoman rule over Greece, he was in contact of Catherine the Great during the Orlov Revolt.

He was born in Kalamata in ca. 1700, the son of Benou Psaltis and Stathoula Gerakari, daughter of Liverios Gerakaris. He was skilled in trading and quickly made a huge fortune, coming to own estates with thousands of acres. Consequently, he soon became one of the leading Greek notables in the Peloponnese, and the Turkish authorities tried to have him on their side.

In 1767, he came into contact with the envoys of Catherine II of Russia, and tried to organize a revolt. With his own funds, he equipped a corps of Maniots with which he took part in the Orlov Revolt. After the rebellion was suppressed, he fled to Naxos island, still occupied by the Russians, while his family was sent to Venetian-held Kythira. After the conclusion of a peace treaty between the Ottoman Empire and Russia, he endeavoured to meet with Catherine II in person, but did not make it, as he was poisoned at Livorno, possibly by Russian officers who were afraid he would expose their errors during the rebellion.
