= Nathan Miller (Rhode Island shipbuilder) =

American merchant and politician

Nathan Miller (March 20, 1743 – May 20, 1790) was an American shipbuilder and merchant from Rhode Island. He was a delegate for Rhode Island to the Confederation Congress in 1788. Although reappointed to the Congress in 1789, he did not attend that year.

Born in Warren, Rhode Island, Miller attended private school and became a shipbuilder and merchant. He served as a member of the Rhode Island Legislature from 1772 to 1774, and in 1780, 1782, 1783, and 1790. In 1772, he was also commissioned a brigadier general in the Rhode Island Militia, serving in this capacity until 1778, although having duties "of an administrative nature, rather than as a field general". He participated in Revolutionary War privateering and was a co-owner of several vessels, including the General Warren, the United States, the General Stark, the Abigail, the George, and the General Wayne.

On January 8, 1764, Miller married Rebecca Barton, with whom he had four children. Miller died in Warren at the age of 47.
