= Lambros Katsonis =

Greek privateer (1752–1805)

- Λάμπρος Κατσώνης
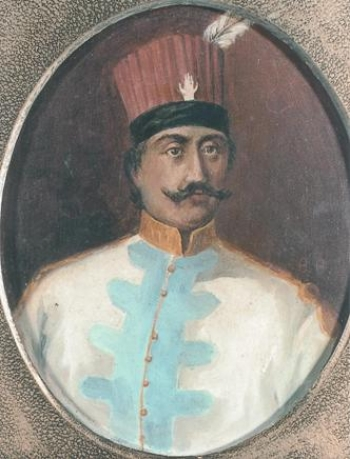
- Portrait, 18th century
- Born: 1752; Livadeia, Ottoman Empire
- Died: 1805 (aged 52–53); Livadiya, Crimea, Russian Empire
- Spouse: Maria Sophianou (Angelina)
- Children: 4
- Relatives: Odysseas Androutsos (godson)
- Military career
- Allegiance: Russia
- Branch: Imperial Russian Army; Imperial Russian Navy
- Rank: Colonel
- Conflicts: Russo-Turkish War (1768–1774); Orlov Revolt; Battle of Chesma; Russo-Turkish War (1787–1792); Battle of Andros; Battle of Porto Kagio
- Awards: Order of St. George IV Class

Lambros Katsonis (Greek: Λάμπρος Κατσώνης; Russian: Ламброс Кацонис; 1752–1805) was a Greek naval commander of the 18th century who would ultimately sail under the Russian flag with the rank of colonel. He became a knight of the Russian Empire and was awarded the Order of St. George.

== Early life ==
Lambros Katsonis was born in 1752 at Livadeia, to a well-off family. He was forced to flee his home in 1767, after feuding with a local Turk and killing him; at Galaxeidi he managed to board a vessel that brought him to the island of Zakynthos, then still under Venetian rule.

Three years later, he went to Livorno, where the Russian fleet under Alexei Grigoryevich Orlov, sent to fight the Ottomans in the Aegean Sea, was gathering. He joined the infantry corps of Greek volunteers set up by the Russians, and distinguished himself due to his intelligence and resolve during the rest of the Russo-Turkish War of 1768–1774. After the war's end, he settled in the Crimea, but soon joined the retinue of the powerful Count Grigory Potemkin. He won the esteem and support of Potemkin when he managed to assassinate an Austrian envoy and steal sensitive documents from him; as a reward, he was promoted to captain and placed in Potemkin's staff.

== Privateer activity ==
=== 1788 ===
When the Russo-Turkish War of 1787–1792 broke out, Katsonis went to Trieste, where with his own money, and through donations from the local Greek community, he bought and equipped a 24-gun warship, and began to raid Ottoman shipping. This first expedition was a great success: over six months, Katsonis remained undefeated, assembling a flotilla of twelve vessels with over 200 guns. His main successes were the destruction of a Turkish pirate base at Kastellorizo, the sinking of an Ottoman frigate off Rhodes, and successfully fighting off the entire Ottoman fleet east of Karpathos. His actions were sanctioned by the Russian Empire in 1788, who took him under its service: Katsonis operated under the Russian flag, the right to award ranks in the name of the Russian Empire, and received financial support from the Russians.

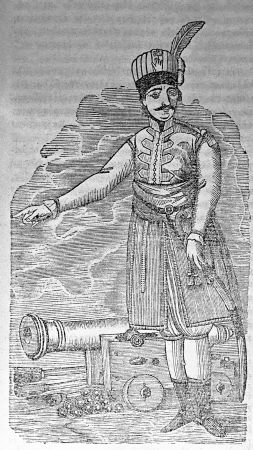
Katsonis with a cannon

=== 1789 ===
His 1789 campaign was even more successful: he gathered a fleet of 17 vessels with 500 guns, and captured Kea Island, which he fortified and made his base of operations. The Ottomans tried to entice him to their side, sending the Dragoman of the Fleet with a letter promising him amnesty for himself and his followers, a salary of 200,000 gold coins, and lordship over an island of his choice. Katsonis rejected the proposal.

On 3 June 1788, he defeated an Ottoman squadron of 11 or 14 ships, including two ships of the line and three frigates, in the strait between Tinos and Mykonos. On 7 August, his ships defeated eight 32-gun Algerian xebecs between Kea and Makronisos, sinking two and pursuing the others until Nafplion. This was followed up by another victory over the Ottoman fleet a fortnight later at Chios. His own fleet increased to 27 vessels, mostly lighter craft, but also including some 24 or 28-gun brigs.

=== 1790 ===
In 1790, Katsonis conceived his most ambitious plan yet. Taking on board the klepht chieftain Andreas Androutsos and his 800 men, he raided Turkish shipping in the Aegean, advancing up to Tenedos, blocking the entrance to the Dardanelles and hoping to confront an Ottoman fleet. The Ottoman government reacted by calling on the aid of the North African fleets, and Katsonis was caught off guard, with his fleet dispersed. He was caught off Andros with only nine vessels between an Ottoman and an Algerian fleet, and defeated in a two-day battle.

With the remaining ships Katsonis fled to the Ionian island of Ithaca, where he managed to reconstitute his forces and recruit more ships. Despite his defeat, he was rewarded by Empress Catherine, on the recommendation of Grigory Potemkin, with promotion to Colonel and the Cross of St. George, 4th Class.

=== 1791–1792 ===
Katsonis and his fleet remained active in the Aegean and continued to score successes against Ottoman shipping. By the summer of 1791, Katsonis disposed of 21 ships. In the meantime, however, the Russian victories at Măcin and Kaliakra led to the war's end with the conclusion of an armistice on 11 August 1791, followed by the Treaty of Jassy. Katsonis was ordered to cease operations. Katsonis refused to obey and gathered his ships at Porto Kagio near Cape Tainaron, but was attacked there by a joint Ottoman–French fleet and most of his fleet was sunken. Katsonis himself managed to escape to Russia with a few of his followers, settling at Livadiya in the Crimea.

== Marriage and children ==
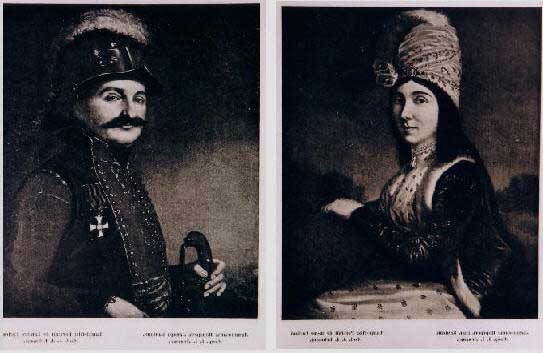
Lambros Katsonis and his wife

His wife was known as Angelina in Russia, but her real name was Maria Sophianou. He had three sons and possibly one daughter. His first son was killed by the Turks when he was still infant, in the Greek island of Kea. The second, Lykourgos (known in Russia as Ликург Ламбрович Качиони, 1790–1863), born on a Greek Island, had a brilliant career as officer in the Imperial Russian Army, including his service in the Greek Battalion of Balaklava. The third son, Alexander who was born in the Crimea, also became an officer in the Imperial Russian Army. According to some sources he had a daughter named Garyfallia, but there is no information about her life. One of Lambros' grandsons, Spyridon son of Alexander, was a known Russian writer. He was also the godfather of Odysseas Androutsos, a commander of the Greek War of Independence.

== Legacy ==
The Livadia Palace, the summer home of the last emperors of Russa was built on Katsonis' Livadia estate after 1861. The name of the estate was given to it by Katsonis, who named it after his birthplace; moreover, this is the origin of the name of the town of Livadiya itself. It is there that the World War II Yalta Conference took place. This is where he was assassinated in 1805, under unclear circumstances.

The Hellenic Navy has named four of its ships after Katsonis.

== Sources ==
- "Ламбро-Качони" . Brockhaus and Efron Encyclopedic Dictionary (in Russian). 1906.
- Aspreas, G. (1929). "Κατσώνης Λάμπρος". Μεγάλη Στρατιωτικὴ καὶ Ναυτικὴ Ἐγκυκλοπαιδεία. Tόμος Τέταρτος: Καβάδης–Μωριάς [Great Military and Naval Encyclopaedia. Volume IV: Kavadh–Morea] (in Greek). Athens: Ἔκδοσις Μεγάλης Στρατιωτικῆς καὶ Ναυτικῆς Ἐγκυκλοπαιδείας. pp. 103–104. OCLC 31255024.
- Pryakhin, Yuri D. (2004). Ламброс Кацонис в истории Греции и России [Lambros Katsonis in the history of Greece and Russia] (in Russian). St. Petersburg: Aletheia. ISBN 5893297318.
- Vakalopoulos, Apostolos (1975). "Η στροφή των Ελλήνων προς τους Ρώσους: Ο Ρωσοτουρκικός πόλεμος του 1787–1792 και οι Έλληνες. Οι αγώνες των Σουλιωτών και η δράση του Λάμπρου Κατσώνη" [The Greeks turn to the Russians: The Russo-Turkish War of 1787–1792 and the Greeks. The struggles of the Souliots and the actions of Lambros Katsonis]. In Christopoulos, Georgios A. & Bastias, Ioannis K. (eds.). Ιστορία του Ελληνικού Έθνους [History of the Greek Nation] (in Greek). Vol. ΙΑ: Ο Ελληνισμός υπό ξένη κυριαρχία (περίοδος 1669 - 1821), Τουρκοκρατία - Λατινοκρατία [Hellenism under Foreign Rule (Period 1669 - 1821), Turkocracy – Latinocracy]. Athens: Ekdotiki Athinon. pp. 85–97. ISBN 978-960-213-100-8.
