= Orlov revolt =

1770 Greek uprising against the Ottoman Empire

- Part of the Russo-Turkish War (1768–1774)
- Operations during the Russo-Turkish War (1768–1774) and Orlov revolt (1770)
Date	February 1770 – 17 June 1771
Location	Ottoman Empire: Morea Eyalet; Ioannina Eyalet; Eyalet of the Archipelago
Result	Ottoman victory

Belligerents
Greeks; Supported by: (Russian Empire) Russia	Ottoman Empire; Pashalik of Scutari

Commanders and leaders
Panagiotis Benakis; Daskalogiannis (executed); Konstantinos Kolokotronis †; Lambros Katsonis (Russian Empire) Alexei Orlov	(Ottoman Empire) Muhsinzade Mehmed Pasha; Mustafa Pasha; Kara Mahmud Pasha

Units involved
Greek revolutionaries Imperial Russian Navy	(Ottoman Empire) Ottoman army Albanian mercenaries

Strength
Unknown	3,000 Gheg Albanians under Mustafa Pasha; 20,000 Albanians and Turks under Kara Mahmud Pasha

Casualties and losses
Unknown	Unknown
- 50,000 Greek civilians massacred

The Orlov revolt (Greek: Ορλωφικά, Ορλοφικά, Ορλώφεια, lit. 'Orlov events') was a Greek uprising in the Peloponnese and later also in Crete that broke out in February 1770, following the arrival of Russian Admiral Alexey Orlov, commander of the Imperial Russian Navy during the Russo-Turkish War (1768–1774), at the Mani Peninsula. The revolt, a major precursor to the Greek War of Independence (which erupted in 1821), was part of Catherine the Great's so-called "Greek Plan" and was eventually suppressed by the Ottomans by June 1771.

== Background ==
=== Rise of the Russo-Turkish conflict ===
The first attempts of the nascent Russian Empire, under Tsar Peter the Great, to expand south to Ottoman-ruled territories in the Crimea and the Sea of Azov failed, and it was not until the Treaty of Niš in 1739 that their possession of Azov was recognized. Russo-Ottoman antagonism continued to grow over the following decades, as the two powers rivalled for influence in their borderlands in Crimea, Ukraine, Poland, and Moldavia, leading finally to the outbreak of war in 1768.

During the same period, Russian influence began to spread among the Christians living under Ottoman rule. Prophecies of a 'golden nation' or 'blonde nation' that would destroy the Ottoman Empire began circulating already in the 1690s, during the height of the Russo-Turkish War of 1686–1700. At the same time, the Franco-Ottoman alliance resulted in advantages for the Catholics in the Ottoman Empire, and particularly the Holy Land. This caused the Greek Orthodox patriarchs of Constantinople and Jerusalem to turn to Russia for support in recovering their privileges. The Austrian advance into the northwestern Balkans during the Great Turkish War also caused concern, with the Serbian patriarch and the ruler of Wallachia, Șerban Cantacuzino, seeking Russian support as early as 1688. The presence of a Russian ambassador at the Ottoman court from 1700 on also allowed direct contacts of Russian officials with the Ottoman Christians, while an increasing number of the latter sought refuge and employment in Russia, where Greek colonies were established.

=== Outbreak of the Russo-Turkish War of 1768–1774 ===
The Ottoman Empire had its longest period of peace between 1739 (Treaty of Belgrade) and 1768 - three decades when it did not engage any of its European rivals. Europe was caught up in costly and bloody conflicts while the Ottomans stayed out and tended to economy, politics, and rebuilding social and administrative organization.

This peaceful period came to an end on 23 October 1768, when the Porte declared war on Russia. Causes included aggressive Russian foreign policy, Russian interference in Crimea (an Ottoman vassal), and the power struggle in Poland-Lithuania. There were insignificant events in 1768–69, as both sides prepared for a long campaign.

Meanwhile, Greek rebels were being prepared. Wishing to weaken the Ottoman Empire and establish a pro-Russian independent Greek state, Russian emissaries had been sent to Mani in the mid-1760s to make a pact with the strongest local military leaders, and at the same time notable Greeks approached various Russian agents, discussing plans for the liberation of Greece. In preparation for war, Russian agents promoted Greek rebellion to support military actions in the north. Russian artillery captain Grigorios Papadopoulos (or Georgios Papasoglu), a Greek, was dispatched to Mani. Georgios Papazolis, another Greek officer of the Russian army, cooperated with the brothers Grigory and Alexei Orlov in preparations for a Greek insurrection in the Morea during the Russian military operations against the Ottoman Empire in 1769. The organization of the Greek rebellion was put under the Orlov brothers, with Alexei as the Russian fleet commander.

Some Greek notables joined the Russian side and promised them men and supplies, while in return they expected massive Russian aid (10,000 soldiers and military equipment). Russia planned to incite Orthodox Christians to revolt, and sent agents to Bosnia, Herzegovina, Montenegro, Albania, Crete, and the Morea. Another Orlov brother, Fyodor Orlov, was sent to coordinate rebels in Morea, deemed the most important strategic area in mainland Greece (due to its ports). Russia assembled a war fleet for deployment in the Mediterranean, described as "one of the most spectacular events of the 18th century", which caught the Ottomans off guard. The first fleet contingent (out of two) departed in August 1769 and arrived in the Aegean in December. This expedition of only four ships, a few hundred soldiers, and inadequate arms supplies greatly disappointed the Greeks. Nevertheless, combined Russian-Greek forces attempted a campaign.

== Progress of the revolt ==
=== Peloponnese ===
The arrival of the Russian fleet in Mani in February 1770 saw the establishment of local armed groups in Mani and Kalamata. However, the small Russian expeditionary force could not convince a part of the local Greeks to take arms. The Russian manpower was much less than expected, and mutual distrust developed between the Greek and Russian leaders. Among the Greek leaders that were approached were Panagiotis Benakis, a notable from Kalamata; the local metropolitan bishop, Anthimos; and the Cretan shipping magnate John Vlachos "Daskalogiannis". Initially an army of 1,400 men was formed, but additional reinforcement of Cretans arrived in the following days. The Greek forces were organized into major units (called legions) with the help of a small number of Russian officers and soldiers. The "Eastern Spartan Legion" in Laconia, with 1,200 men, was organized by P. P. Dolgorukov and led by Georgios "Yiorgakis" Mavromichalis, while the "Western Spartan Legion" in Messenia was led by G. M. Barkov and Antonios Psarros.

The Greek rebels were initially successful and managed to defeat Ottoman forces in Laconia and eastern Messenia in southern Morea. However, the revolt failed to effectively spread, and thus the fortresses of Navarino, Methone, and the administrative center of Morea, Tripolitsa (modern Tripoli), remained in Ottoman hands. The rebels did manage to control the fortress of Mystras, where they set up a local government.

The population of Corinth rose in revolt and began to besiege nearby Nafplio. The Ottoman guard of the citadel of Monemvasia was also threatened. A total of 5,000 volunteers from the Ionian islands of Cephalonia and Zakynthos also reinforced the revolutionary forces in Peloponesse. Gastouni was also taken, while Patras was found under siege by the Greek units. Additional uprisings occurred around the towns of Mesolongi and Nafpaktos in Central Greece.

On 12 March the western legion and the Russian fleet began to siege the fortress of Koroni. However, after six weeks the garrison could not be taken.

=== Crete ===
Meanwhile, the Greek revolt in Crete was led by Daskalogiannis. Soon afterward, Sfakians refused to pay taxes and revolted in great numbers. However, the support promised by the Russian emissaries never arrived at Crete and Daskalogiannis was left to his own devices. He managed to organize a band of 2,000 well-armed men, who descended from the mountains onto the plains of western Crete. There with messianic overtones they spent a week preparing with feasting, and in formations of small bands started to kill local Muslims in an unsuccessful effort to convince other Cretans to join them in their quest to overthrow the Ottomans. The Cretan uprising was soon suppressed by numerically superior Ottoman units.

=== Ottoman response ===
In April the revolutionaries managed to capture the fortress of Navarino; however, the uprising was already doomed and the Russian fleet abandoned the region in following June.

As soon as the first news of the Russian-backed Greek revolt reached the Ottoman capital, the first anti-Greek pogroms broke out in various cities of the Ottoman Empire, including Smyrna.

With the assistance of Greek islanders, the Russian fleet was able to score a major victory against the Ottoman Navy in the Battle of Cesme, but this did not help the Greek army in Morea. As the Russians failed to bring the forces they promised, the revolt was soon crushed. Greek reinforcements from Macedonia and Olympus region faced opposition in their descent to Morea and thus were unable to assist the revolutionaries. Meanwhile, one of the Ottoman Empire's most competent military commanders and former Grand Vizier, Muhsinzade Mehmed Pasha, took up the command of the garrison at Nafplion and, after calling for militia from some northern provinces, crushed the Russo-Greek expedition at Tripolitsa.

== Aftermath ==
The Muslim Albanian mercenaries hired by the Ottomans remained in the Peloponnese for several years after the suppression of the revolt, periodically launching reprisals against the Greeks. Referred to by the local Greek populace as "Turk-Albanians", these forces had also destroyed many cities and towns in Epirus during 1769–1770. In Patras, nearly no one was left alive after the Turkish-Albanian invasion. The city of Mystras was left in ruins and the metropolitan bishop Ananias was executed, despite having saved the lives of several Turks during the uprising. A great number of local Greeks were killed by the Albanian groups, while several children were sold into slavery in the Ottoman Empire. In the nine years following the revolt, c. 20,000–30,000 local Greeks either succumbed or left their homeland.

The Ottoman government was unable to pay the wages the Albanian mercenaries demanded for their service, causing the latter to ravage the region. In 1774, the Russo-Turkish War ended with the Treaty of Küçük Kaynarca, which granted general amnesty to the population. Nevertheless, attacks by Muslim Albanian mercenaries in the region continued not only against the Greek population but also against Turks. The extensive destruction and lack of control in the Peloponnese forced the central Ottoman government to send a regular Turkish military force to suppress the Albanian troops in 1779, and eventually drive them out from Peloponnese.

From the Russian point of view, Count Orlov's mission was mostly a success, damaging the Ottoman fleet, directing Ottoman troops south, and contributing to the victory that led to the signing of the Treaty of Küçük Kaynarca.

From the Greek point of view, the revolt had significant consequences. On the one hand, it cost a huge number of lives (both in battle and in the Ottoman reprisals that followed). On the other hand, the Milet-i Rum, of which Greek were a part, did well out of the Treaty of Küçük Kaynarca. Greek ships, for example, gained the right to sail under the Russian flag and had open access to the Black Sea and the Mediterranean. Russia gained the right to protect the Orthodox population and its churches and to build an Orthodox cathedral in Istanbul. Russia also obtained the right to appoint consuls throughout the empire, and most of these were Greeks.

The treaty ushered in major changes to the Greek world. Greek connections to Russia became even stronger because of the influence of prominent Greeks in Russia such as Count Demetrio Mocenigo, Count Ioannis Kapodistrias, Alexandros Ypsilantis, Skarlatos D. Sturdza, Spyridon Destunis, and others who occupied high positions in the Russian imperial administration. In the decades after the revolt, tens of thousands of Greeks emigrated from the Ottoman to the Russian empire, establishing colonies in the Crimea and along the shores of the Sea of Azov. Cities like Mariupol and Taganrog became booming commercial centers dominated by Ottoman Greek immigrants and their Greek-Russian successors. They would play prominent roles in the history of Greece and the Greeks until their destruction in the 1930s.

== In popular culture ==
The revolt was a crucial event for the further development of Philhellenism as an important literary movement in the Western world. As such, the protagonist in Friedrich Hölderlin's novel Hyperion participates in a 1770 revolt inspired by the Orlov Revolt.

== Gallery ==
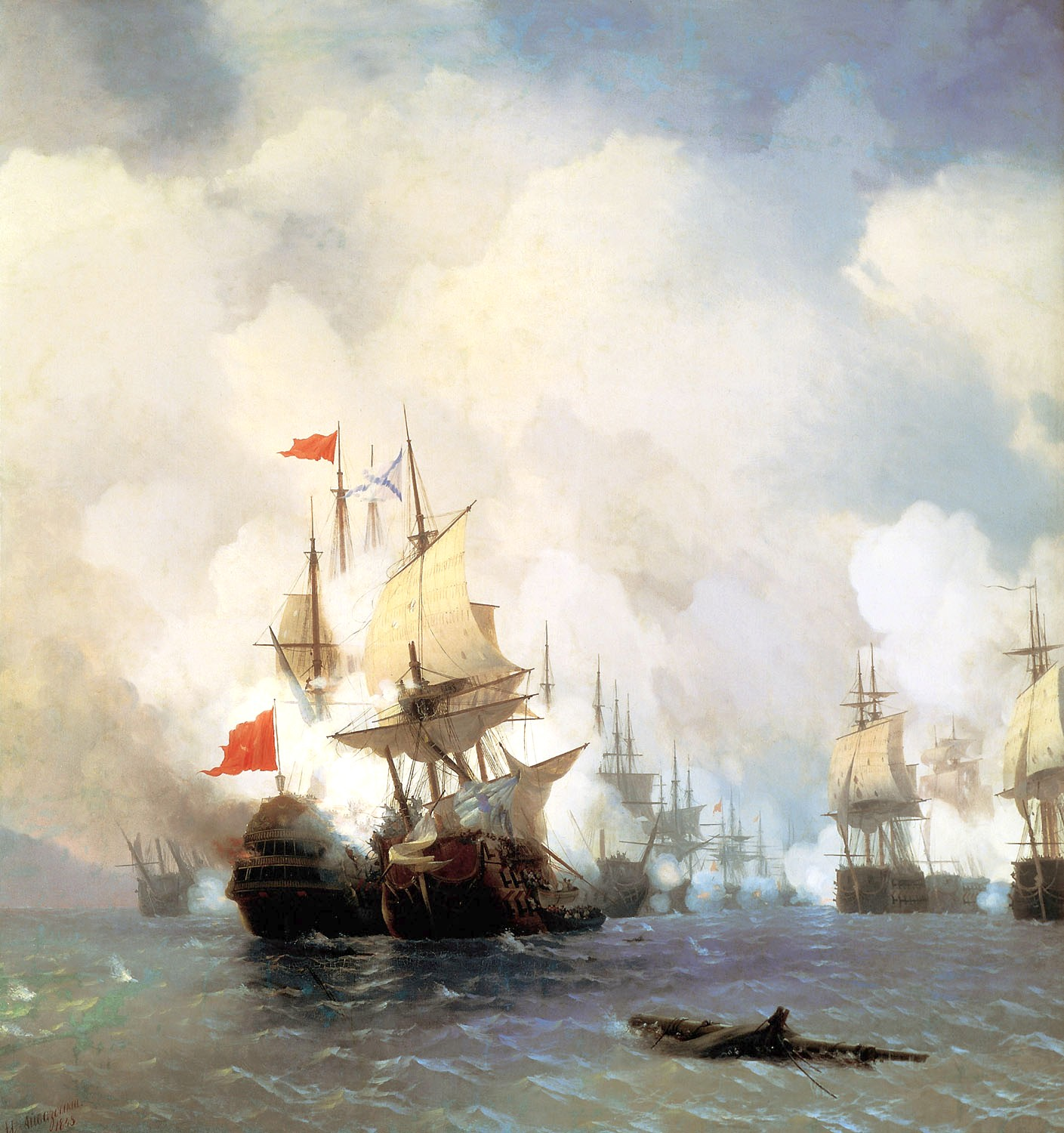
Battle of Chios (Chesma) by Ivan Aivazovsky (1848)

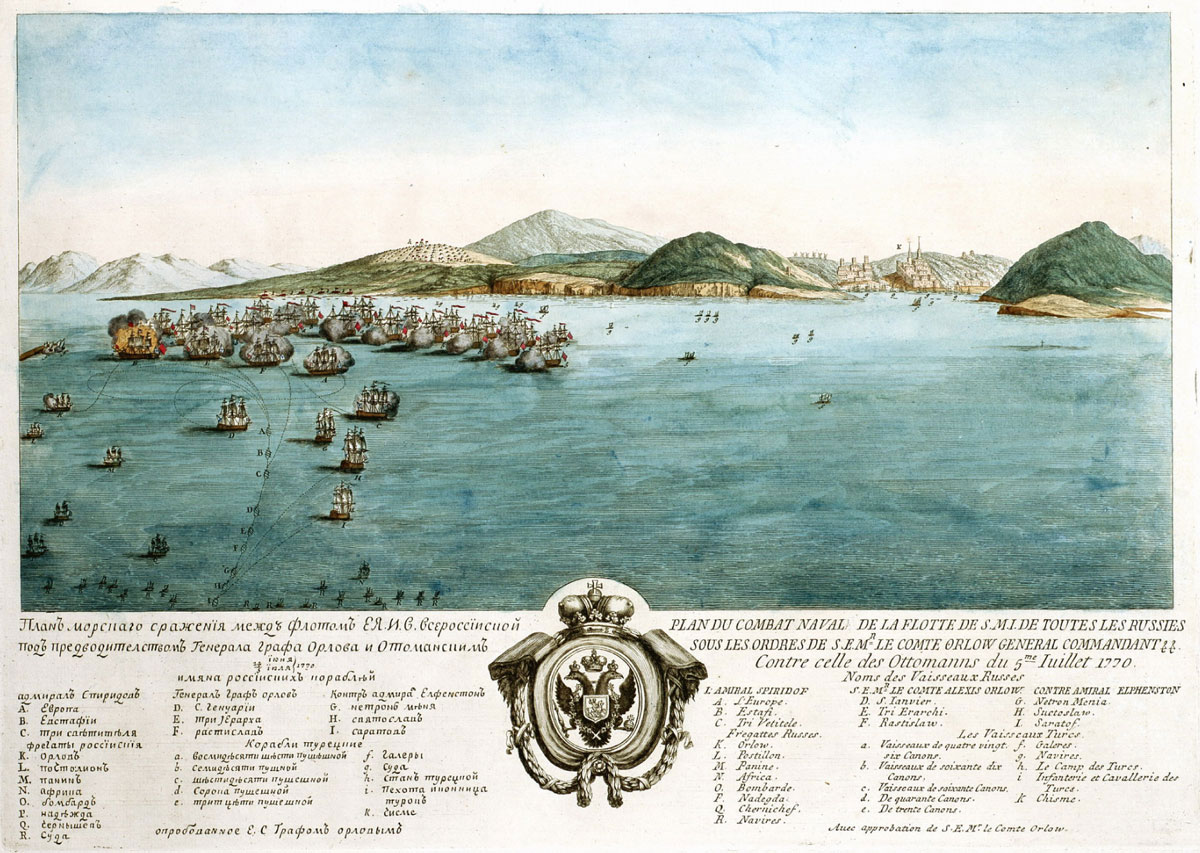
Gravour showing the Battle of Chesma

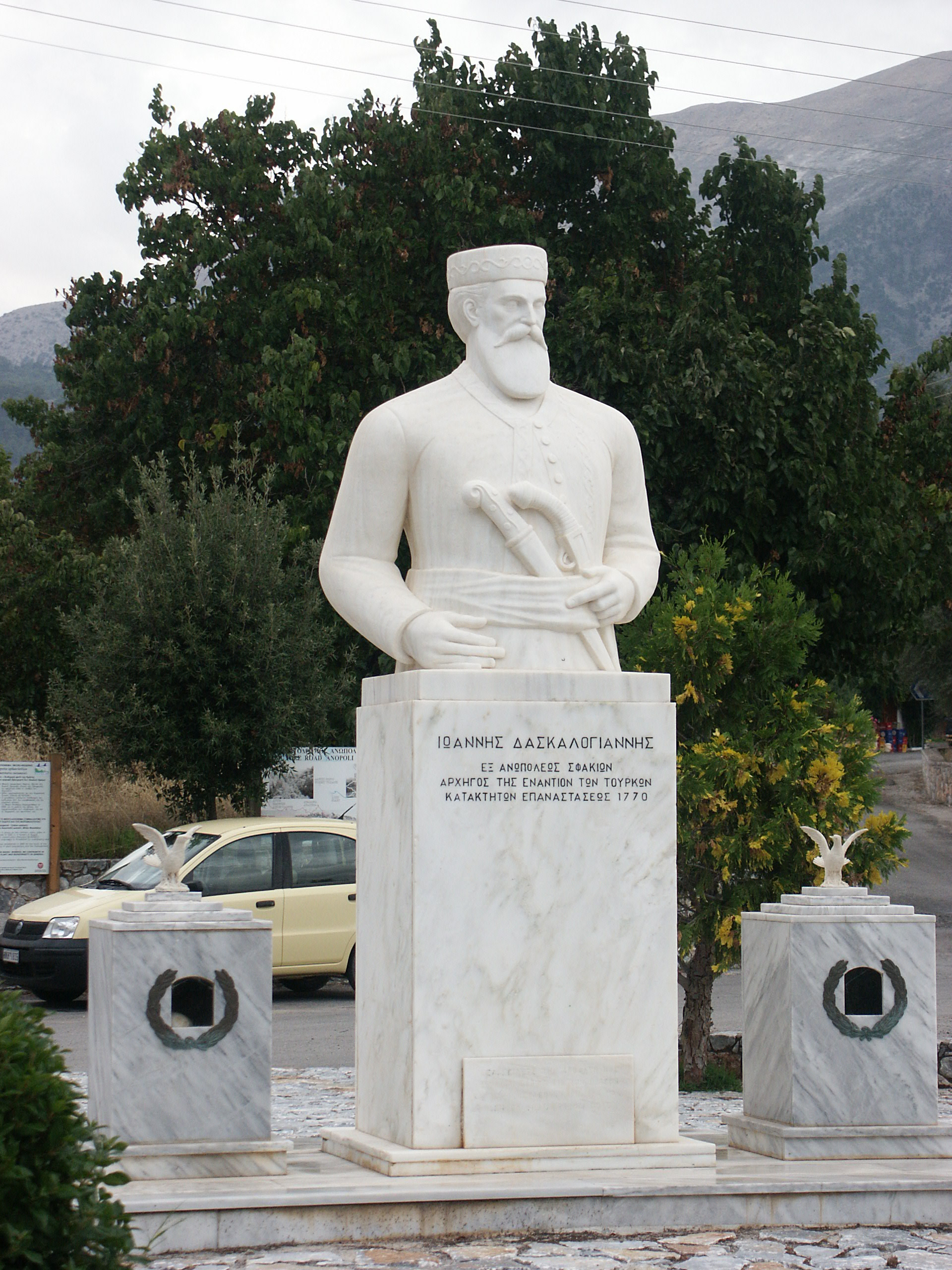
A bust of Daskalogiannis in Anopolis, Crete

== See also ==
- Parthenios IV of Old Patras

== Annotations ==
1. It is known as the Orlov Rebellion, Orlov Revolt

== Sources ==
- Brewer, David (16 April 2012). Greece, the Hidden Centuries: Turkish Rule from the Fall of Constantinople to Greek Independence. Bloomsbury Publishing. ISBN 978-0-85772-167-9.
- Dakin, Douglas (1973). The Greek Struggle for Independence, 1821-1833. University of California Press. ISBN 9780520023420.
- Gallant, Thomas (2015). "The winds of change". The Edinburgh History of the Greeks, 1768 to 1913: The Long Nineteenth Century. Edinburgh University Press. pp. 17–. ISBN 978-0-7486-3607-5.
- Jelavich, Barbara (1983). History of the Balkans. Vol. 1. Cambridge University Press. pp. 69, 78. ISBN 9780521252492.
- Pappas, Nicholas Charles (1982). Greeks in Russian military service in the late eighteen and early nineteenth centuries. Stanford University.
- Papadopoulos, Stefanos (1975). "Η Ελληνική Επανάσταση του 1770 και ο αντίκτυπός της στις ελληνικές χώρες" [The Greek Revolution of 1770 and its impact on the Greek lands]. In Christopoulos, Georgios A. & Bastias, Ioannis K. (eds.). Ιστορία του Ελληνικού Έθνους [History of the Greek Nation] (in Greek). Vol. ΙΑ: Ο Ελληνισμός υπό ξένη κυριαρχία (περίοδος 1669 - 1821), Τουρκοκρατία - Λατινοκρατία [Hellenism under Foreign Rule (Period 1669 - 1821), Turkocracy – Latinocracy]. Athens: Ekdotiki Athinon. pp. 58–85. ISBN 978-960-213-100-8.
- Roessel, David (2001). In Byron's Shadow: Modern Greece in the English and American Imagination. Oxford University Press. ISBN 9780198032908.
- Stavrianos, Leften Stavros (2000). The Balkans Since 1453. C. Hurst & Co. Publishers. pp. 187–190, 195. ISBN 978-1-85065-551-0.
- Vakalopoulos, Apostolos (1975). "Η άνοδος της ρωσικής δυνάμεως" [The rise of Russian power]. In Christopoulos, Georgios A. & Bastias, Ioannis K. (eds.). Ιστορία του Ελληνικού Έθνους [History of the Greek Nation] (in Greek). Vol. ΙΑ: Ο Ελληνισμός υπό ξένη κυριαρχία (περίοδος 1669 - 1821), Τουρκοκρατία - Λατινοκρατία [Hellenism under Foreign Rule (Period 1669 - 1821), Turkocracy – Latinocracy]. Athens: Ekdotiki Athinon. pp. 51–58. ISBN 978-960-213-100-8.
