= Anopolis =

Ancient city-state in Crete, Greece

Coordinates: 35°12′58″N 24°04′55″E

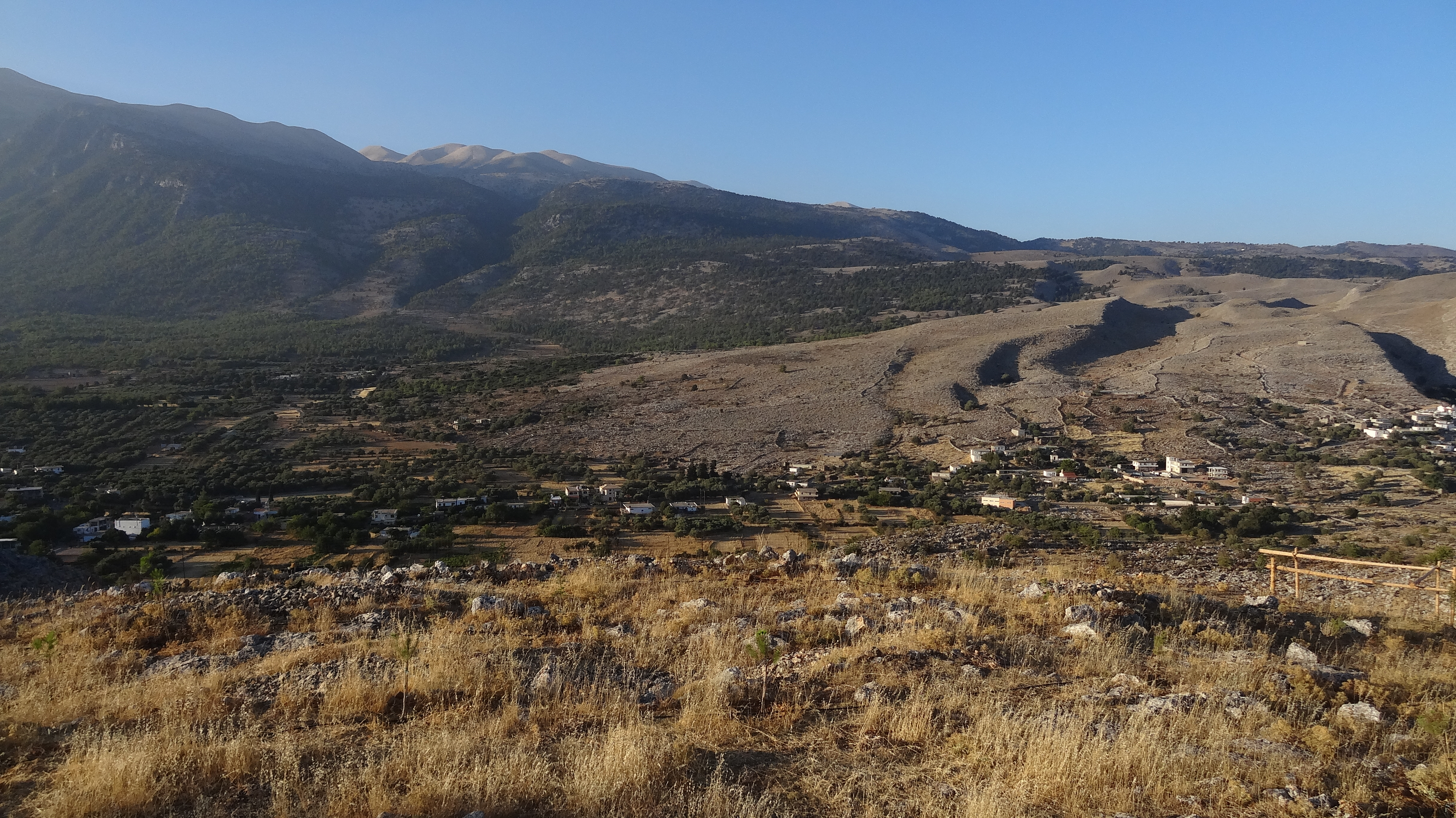

Anopolis (Ancient Greek: Ἀνώπολις) was a town and polis (city-state) of ancient Crete. Stephanus of Byzantium claims Anopolis an earlier name of, rather than a predecessor settlement to, Araden (Ἀραδήν)

Its site is located near modern Anopoli.
