= Kyriakoulis Argyrokastritis =

Greek resistance leader

Kyriakoulis Argyrokastritis (Greek: Κυριακούλης Αργυροκαστρίτης; died 1828) also known as Kyriakoulis Polychronis was a Greek resistance leader of the Greek War of Independence.

He was born in Gjirokastër (Argyrokastron in Greek, his name means 'from Gjirokastër'), modern Albania, when the town was under Ottoman rule. Argyrokastritis joined the Greek revolution and in January 1828 together with the resistance leader Hatzimichalis Dalianis, from Delvinaki, landed on the island of Crete to support the revolution there.

In May 1828, Epirotes and Cretans under the leadership of Hatzimichalis, were besieged by the numerical superior Ottoman army of the local ruler, Mustafa Naili Pasha, in Frangokastello castle, Sfakia region. The castle defence was doomed after seven days and the fortress fell back to Ottoman hands. Both Dalianis and Argyrokastritis were killed during the conflict.

According to a local tradition in Crete, an unexplained phenomenon that usually occurs on the anniversary of the Frangokastello battle where images of advancing troops, called Drosoulites (dew-men) appear at dawn to hover above the tragic location.
