= Sfakians =

Ethnic Greek subgroup

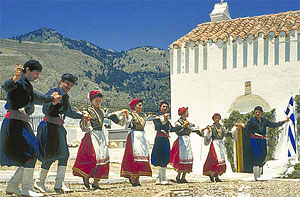
- A group of modern Sfakians dancing at Komitades, Sfakia.

Total population
- Unknown

Regions with significant populations
- Greece, Cyprus, Germany, United States

Languages
- Sfakian Greek

Religion
- Greek Orthodoxy

Related ethnic groups
- Maniots, Tsakonians, and other Greeks

The Sfakians (or Sphakians or Sfakiots; Greek: Σφακιανοί) are the inhabitants of the region of Sfakia located in western Crete. The Sfakians hold themselves to be the direct descendants of the Dorians who came down to Crete around 1100 BC.

The inhabitants of Sfakia have faced numerous foreign invaders, to which fact they owe their reputation as courageous warriors that they have had for centuries.

== Sfakians and Saracens ==
When the Saracen Arabs invaded Crete in 824 AD, many regions of the island, Sphakia included, escaped effective Arab rule. One reason frequently offered is geography: Sphakians, secure in their mountain fastness, could mount a formidable deep defence from high ground gradually retreating upward while imposing relatively high casualties on invaders from the lowlands.

In refusing to submit to the Arabs, the Sfakians established a form of self-government known as the Gerousia ("Council of Elders"); this had its antecedent in the Spartan Gerousia, but it is not clear there is any connection. The members of the council were either known as Gerontes ("Elders") or Dimogerontes ("Public Elders") who were selected based on the general consensus of the members of the entire community (cf. alderman).

Nicephorus Phocas, general of the Greek Byzantine forces sent to liberate Crete, appointed large numbers of Sfakian warriors to defend his rear against Arab attacks from the south while he besieged Chandax. Chandax was the key to Phocas's campaign as it was both the most formidable Arab fortress and the capital of Crete under Arab rule.

The Sfakians not only successfully protected General Phocas's troops, but they also supported him in the siege of Chandax, which fell on March 7, 961 AD, marking the end of Arab rule in Crete. General Phocas was so grateful for the contributions of the Sfakians that he gave the Gerontes many presents which included weapons and lavish clothing. Moreover, the general allowed the Sfakians the right to continue with their own form of self-government with the added benefit of being exempt from all taxes. Moreover, when General Phocas became the emperor of the Byzantine Empire, he reconfirmed these privileges.

== Peace in Byzantine Crete ==
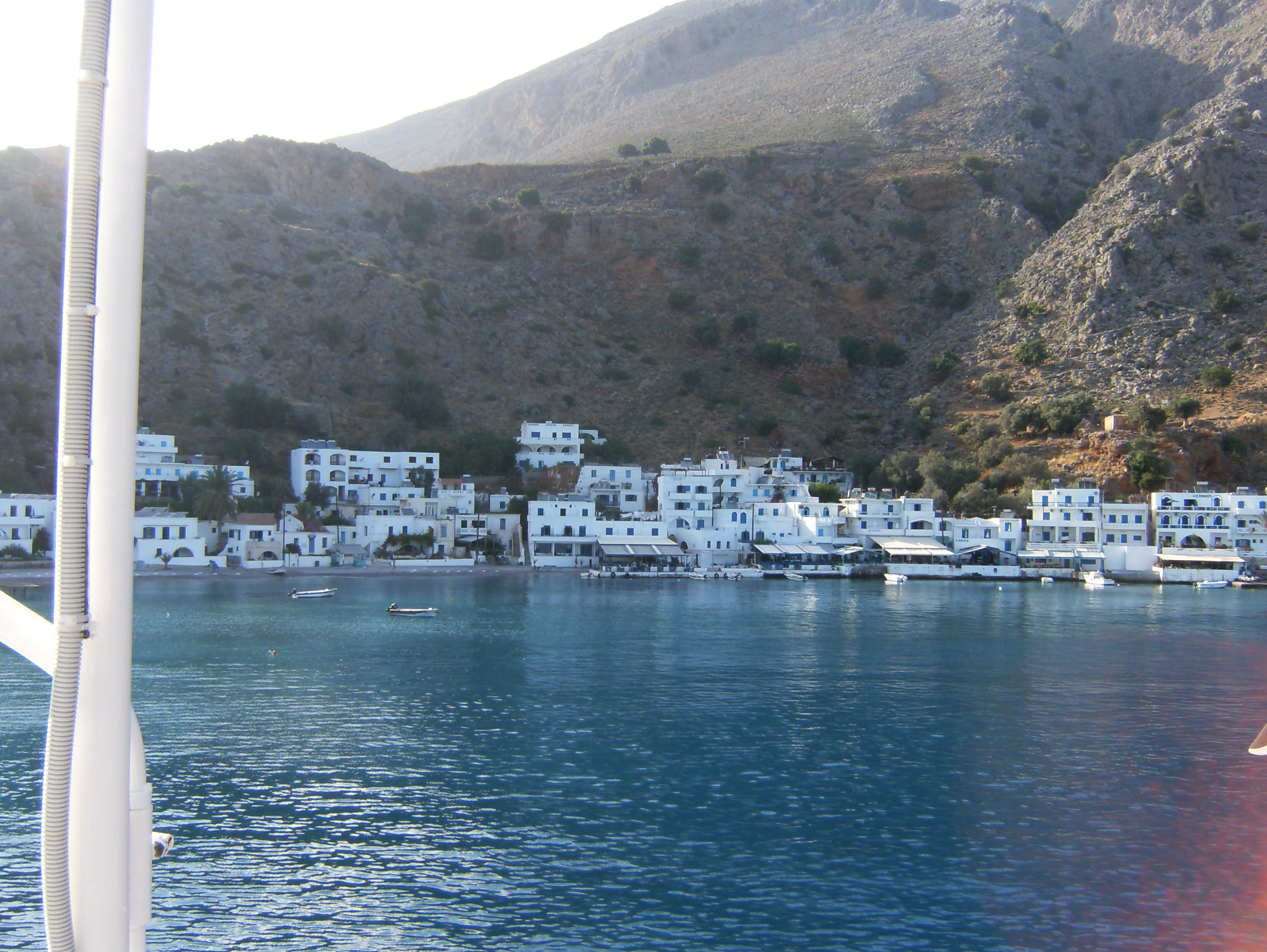
View of Loutro community at Sfakia region.

At the dawn of the second Byzantine period in Crete (961–1204), the island itself was in a state of devastation. Many of the inhabitants were sold to slave markets, the economy was in ruins, and the administrative structure of government had no presence on the island. The Byzantines immediately started to rebuild fortifications on the island in order to guard against future attacks. Also, they placed a new administrative system that divided the island into a number of provinces that appointed their own governors.

A new period of cultural and economic renewal began to emerge in Crete. Christianity in Crete was undergoing a revival thanks to missionaries such as Saint Nikon the Metanoeite ("The Repenter") and Saint Ioannis Xenos ("John the Stranger"). The local population grew and further assistance was provided by Emperor Alexius I Comnenus. In 1080, the emperor ordered the migration and settlement of Greek Byzantine families in Crete.

Emperor Alexius II Comnenus, grandson of Alexius I Comnenus, issued an imperial order that divided the island into twelve provinces and appointed twelve princes from the Byzantine Empire to govern them. Each prince was known as an archondopoulon ("petty lord"; cp. English baron) and he would arrive with his extended family to settle in the area allocated to him. From this event, a number of great aristocratic families of Crete emerged, some of them still in existence today. The archondopoula of Crete entailed the families of Kallergis, Skordilis, Melisseni, Varouchi, Mousouri, Vlasti, Hortatzi, and others.

Sfakia itself was allocated to the emperor's nephew, Marinos Skordilis, who came to Crete with nine of his brothers who also brought over their sons and families. The borders of Skordilis's territory ranged from Askyfou east to Koustogerako and along the south coast to Agia Roumeli, Omprosgialos (today's Hora Sfakion) and to Frangokastello (the largest town in Skordilis's territory was Anopoli and many Sfakian families today claim to be direct descendants of the original Skordiles).

John Phocas, a direct descendant of the emperor who freed Crete from the Arabs, was considered to be the most senior member of the twelve archondopoula. His territory was one of the largest, which covered the greater part of today's province of Rethymno, all the way south to the coast and westward up to the valley of Askyfou, where the border of the Skordilis' territory was located (the name of the family changed a few years later under the Venetians to Kallergis and families that today claim to be direct descendants of the Phocas-Kallergis dynasty are one of the largest family groups in Crete, including a number from Sfakia).

== Revolts against Venice ==
=== Rebellions (1212–1283) ===
During Venetian rule in Crete (1204–1669), the Greek inhabitants of the island rebelled at least twenty-seven times (without counting any of the other smaller local uprisings) particularly during the first decades of Venetian occupation in favor of re-unification with the Byzantines. Some of these revolutions lasted for years and were eventually suppressed by the Venetians with great brutality. Many of these revolutions sprang out of the "Lefka Ori" (or "White Mountains"), which was a Sfakian stronghold. Many of the revolutionaries were led by members of the Archondopouloi families, especially members of the Sfakian-based families of Skordilis and Phocas/Kallergis.

There occurred over fourteen insurrections between 1207 and 1365. The first rebellion in 1212, against Venetian resettlement, was started by the Aghiostephanites or Argyropouli but was quickly quelled by Venice. In 1217, another revolt occurred that was caused by a private dispute over stolen horses between the noble Skordilis and the Venetian Castellan. The revolt spread rapidly, but a treaty was made and signed between a new Duke and the rebels. Another large rebellion occurred in 1230 in the Rethymno area as a result of the gathering of the noble clans of Skordilis, Melisseni, and Drakontopouli. The rebellion went on for six years until Venice conceded much land and many garrisons in order to bring the revolt to an end. Venice, from this point on, had its hands full with Crete.

Over the next few decades starting in 1212, the Venetians began to resettle numerous noble families from Venice in order to acquire better control over Crete. Chandax was renamed Candia (today's Heraklion) and became the seat of the Duke of Candia. The duke was appointed for a two-year term by Venice and the island was known as the "Regno di Candia" or the "Kingdom of Crete." In 1252, Chania was built on the ancient city of Kydonia by the Venetians and Crete was divided into six provinces (sexteria). Eventually, the six provinces became four counties, but Sfakia always remained out of the direct control of the Venetians who maintained only a small garrison at the castle at Omprosgialos (today's Hora Sfakion). The Venetians would rarely venture outside of their castle walls.

In 1273, the Hortatzi brothers Georgios and Theodore became the leaders of a great rebellion supported by all Cretan archons but of one revealing exception. The revolt lasted for six years and the costs to the Venetians were heavy. However, the Cretan nobleman, Alexios Kallergis, was lured by the promises given to him by the Venetians and he eventually supported them. The Venetian attack against the Hortatzi brothers was decisive and in 1279, the entire rebellion was crushed.

The Venetians did not keep their promises to Alexios Kallergis and were unfortunately very cruel in their treatment of the Cretan rebels. As a result, Kallergis started one of the largest and most destructive rebellions against the Venetians in 1283. After sixteen years of fighting, the Venetians and Kallergis secretly negotiated an end to the rebellion with numerous concessions made on both sides. In return for the Venetian concessions that entailed the allowing of mixed marriages (in which such a "privilege" did not persuade the Sfakians and Cretans to perceive the Venetians any more favorably) and the installation of a Greek bishopric, Kallergis would swear allegiance to Venice.

=== The Chrysomallousa revolution (1319) ===
One of the major Sfakian revolutions against Venetian rule was the Chrysomallousa Revolution of 1319. The Venetian garrison maintained at Omprosgialos at Sfakia consisted of only fifteen soldiers and an officer. These troops were merely keeping an eye out on the Sfakians, but rarely did they venture outside and they never interfered in Sfakian affairs. Capuleto, the Venetian officer in charge of the garrison, was attracted one day by a young girl at the well of the village. He approached the young girl and kissed her. She slapped Capuleto in the face, but he managed to pull out a dagger and cut some of the girl's golden hair. The girl's name was Chrysi Skordilis and she was from the Archondopoula family of the Skordilises. She was also called "Chrysomallousa" (or "Golden Hair") due to her blond hair. Upon hearing what happened to Chrysi, her relatives immediately killed the offending Venetian officer and most of the guards. Venetian troops arrived soon from Chania and the locals fought the Venetians bravely throughout the district. The revolution went on for more than a year until Archondas Kallergis intervened and had reached a peace treaty with the Venetians. The peace treaty entailed an agreement for the withdrawal of the Venetian forces from the area and an end to hostilities.

=== Rebellions (1332–1371) ===
More rebellions against the Venetians broke out in 1332 in Margarites and in 1341 in Apokoronas. In Amari, Sfakia, Mesara and elsewhere throughout the island, the Cretans succeeded in winning for themselves many new benefits. As a result of the hard tax policy Venice exercised towards its colony, both Cretans and Venetian settlers revolted in 1363. The revolt, which became known as the revolt of St. Titus, overthrew official Venetian rule and declared a Cretan Republic under the protection of Saint Titus, Crete's patron saint who had Christianized the island thirteen centuries earlier. A new rebellion occurred in 1365 and it was crushed by Venice to the point where life in Crete was very miserable.

The Venetians decided to build a castle on the fertile plains east of Sfakia where they intended to place a strong military presence in order to protect Venetian nobles and their properties. This decision was a result of the constant incursions the Venetians were experiencing on the southern coast of Crete from pirates (some of whom were Sfakians). The castle itself would also serve to protect the Venetians from the Sfakians who lived in the mountains north and west of the plains and who were harassing Venetian nobles. In 1371, a Venetian fleet with soldiers and builders arrived on the fertile plain to begin construction on the castle. However, the local Sfakians were against having a castle on their territory. The Sfakians, under the leadership of the six Patsos brothers from the nearby settlement of Patsianos, would destroy every night what the Venetians built during the day. Eventually, the Venetians were forced to bring in additional troops that surrounded the whole area during the whole period that the castle was being built. The Patsos brothers, ready to resume their campaigns against the Venetians, were unfortunately betrayed, arrested and ultimately hanged at the site of the castle. In 1374, the castle was complete, but the Sfakians were not threatened in their stronghold by the Venetian troops who much preferred to be stationed at the castle looking out for pirates instead of trying to establish control over the Sfakians. The castle is now known as Frangokastello.

=== War of the chickens (1470) ===
Another major Sfakian revolution was known as the "Ornithopolemos" (or the "War of the Chickens"), which took place in 1470. This revolution was caused by the pressures the Venetians were placing on the Cretans in order to extract additional tax revenues. A new tax was introduced requiring all Cretan families to provide one well-fed chicken every month to the Venetian in charge of their area. As time went by and Cretan families began to multiply, the number of chickens demanded was increasing and arguments began to start about the correct number of chickens that should be given to the Venetian in charge of the area. Some villages started giving eggs rather than chickens on the basis that the Venetians would hatch the eggs themselves. Legal action was taken by the Venetians against the villagers for short payment, as well as against the Sfakians who were refusing to pay the tax altogether. Eventually, the Venetians issued over 10,000 indictments. The Sfakians, in return, compiled a report charging the Venetian authorities of corruption and sent the report to Chania for dispatch to Venice. The authorities at Chania imprisoned the Sfakian who brought the report and as a result, the Sfakians declared a revolution and encouraged the rest of the Cretans to refuse the tax. The revolution lasted for three years and at the end of the fighting, the Venetians agreed to withdraw the tax from the whole island, as well as withdraw all outstanding legal actions.

=== Kantanoleon's revolution (1527 or 1570) ===
There occurred yet another Sfakian revolution, which became a part of Cretan mythology since the publication of a book in 1872 known as "The Cretan Weddings" by a Lefkadiot writer and historian named Zambelios. The full historical events have never been proven, but there are Venetian records that substantiate large parts of the overall story. However, the records do not fully explain why the wedding was proposed in the first place and by whom. The name of this major uprising was called Kantanoleon's Revolution and the Cretan Weddings. The protagonists of this revolution were George Kantanoleon (who came from the small village of Koustogerako north of Sougia), his son Petros, Francesco Molino (a Venetian noble from Chania), and Sophia (Molino's daughter). Although Kantanoleon came from Koustogerako, a small village just outside today's province of Sfakia, the village itself was on the border of the Sfakian territory owned by Archondopoulo Skordilis. Kantanoleon was also from the family of Skordilis (some sources also claim that his correct surname was Skordilis and that the surname "Kantanoleon" was given to him by the Venetians).

Some time before 1527 (or 1570 according to another source), many people from western Crete met at the monastery of Saint John at Akrotiri to revolt against their Venetian rulers as a result of taxes and brutal treatment, and elected George Kantanoleon as ruler. Following battles at Impros Gorge near Rethymno and at Samaria Gorge at Lasithi, the Venetians withdrew to Chania, allowing the new Cretan government free rein over western Crete. Kantanoleon established his headquarters at Meskla at the foot of the Lefka Ori, about 15 kilometres south of Chania, and set up his government including a more acceptable level of taxation.

The events that followed are disputed. Zambelios, in his book "The Cretan Weddings", claims that Petros (Kantanoleon's son) fell in love with Sophia (Molino’s daughter) and that Molino conspired with the Duke of Candia to trap and kill all the revolutionaries. Molino's plan was for a marriage between his daughter and Petros in which the invitees would be arrested and the rebels killed. A Venetian historian, however, stated that it was Kantanoleon that tried to impose a reconciliation between Cretans and the noble Venetian families of western Crete by arranging the marriage of his son to Molino's daughter, thus trying to establish a new dynasty to govern western Crete.

Both historians agree on the events that transpired at the wedding. The wedding itself had a large number of invited Cretan guests and traditional festivities had large amounts of wine consumed (spiced with opium according to Zambelios). Eventually, all of the guests were surrounded by Venetian troops that came secretly from Chania, Rethymno, and Candia. The troops arrested both Kantanoleon and his son Petros and hanged them on the spot together with more than thirty other Cretan nobles. The rest of the prisoners, ranging in the hundreds, were divided into four groups and one was hanged at the gates of Chania, one at Koutsogerako, one on the road from Chania to Rethymno, and one at Meskla (the headquarters of the rebel government). Yet, the atrocities did not stop there as whole villages were destroyed including Koutsogerako, Meskla, and a few others. The atrocities continued for some time and quite a few Cretan leaders and their families fled up to the mountains and stayed there for some time until eventually an amnesty was issued.

== Sfakians and the fall of Constantinople ==
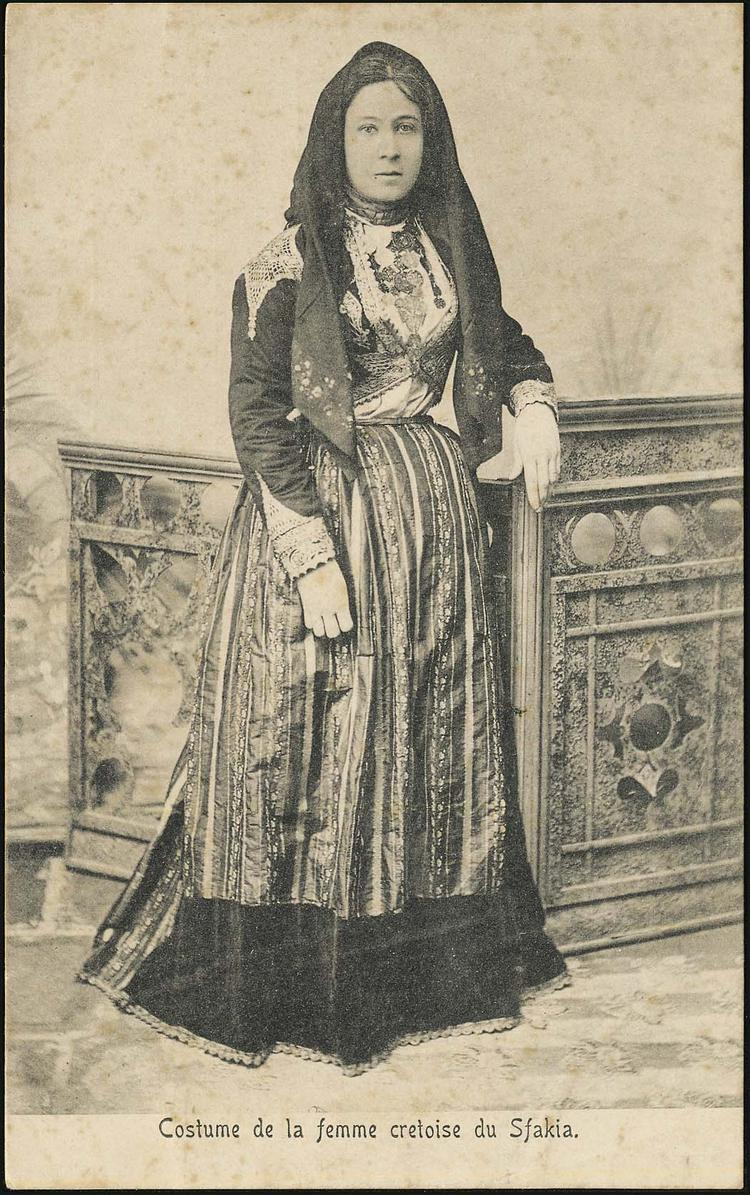
Woman from Sfakia; 19th century.

In January 1453, Sultan Mehmet II had the capital city of the Byzantine Empire, Constantinople, surrounded. He decided that he was going to take it over either by breaking through the city's defenses or by starving the inhabitants into submission. The sultan had his troops and an enormous fleet at his disposal while the besieged Byzantines (and their Christian allies) were demoralized and divided amongst themselves. Responding to a request for help from the Byzantine Emperor, the Sfakian leader Manousos Kallikratis gathered 300 Sfakian warriors and another 760 Cretan fighters from other parts of the island. The leader then sailed in five ships (three of which were Sfakian) and went to help the besieged Emperor.

The Sfakian/Cretan forces fought valiantly by breaking through the Ottoman blockade and by defending the city itself. Many Cretans died alongside the Byzantines, as well as alongside the few Genoese and Venetian co-defenders. When the city fell, the only 170 surviving Cretans had been surrounded by Ottoman troops in one of the city's towers and were refusing to surrender. The sultan was so impressed by their courage and fierce fighting skills that he agreed to let them walk out of the city with their flags, arms, and wounded and sail away to Crete in one of their ships.

A poet of the time has the Byzantine Emperor saying as he was surrounded by the Ottomans, "Christians, Greeks, cut off my head, take it, good Cretans, and carry it to Crete, for the Cretans to see it and be sad at heart." Just a few words from an anonymous poet described the deep impact of the fall of Constantinople had on the Cretans. They were to become the next home of the refugees from Byzantium and responsible for nurturing the rich heritage left to them by the collapsing Byzantine Empire.

== Against the Ottomans with the help of the Imperial Russia ==
During the Ottoman occupation of Crete (1669–1898), and especially from the 18th century onwards, the Greeks looked towards Christian Russia as its savior. Peter the Great, as part of his plan to expand southward to the Black Sea, promoted himself as a champion of the Christians residing in the Balkans. His overall policy, with some variations, was continued by Catherine the Great (1762–1796) in her wars against the Ottoman Turks. She dreamed of resurrecting the Byzantine Empire and placing her grandson as its emperor. Before the first Russo-Turkish War, she sent Russian agents to Morea and the islands in order to stir up the Greeks to fight against the Turks. One of the Russian agents reached a man named Daskaloyiannis and told the Sfakian from Anopoli to lead a revolt. This was ill advice since the Sfakians, let alone the Cretans in general, were hardly ready for such a revolt, as they had virtually no weapons.

Yet, when in 1770, a Russian fleet under Count Aleksey Grigoryevich Orlov appeared in the Aegean, precipitating the Orlov Revolt, Daskaloyiannis and his Cretan followers revolted. However, when the Russo-Turkish conflict ran to an end, the Cretans were left alone against Turkish troops from Chania, Rethymno, and Heraklion. The pasha of Crete had captured the brother and daughters of Daskaloyiannis and with the promise of leniency he demanded that Daskaloyiannis surrender. Daskaloyiannis decided to surrender so that he could see his brother and daughters released. Most of the other leaders of the revolt were killed, and the pasha had Daskaloyiannis first tortured in order to provide any valuable strategic information. Naturally, Daskaloyiannis refused to surrender his people to the Turks. Even after the pasha had the Sfakian flayed alive in front of hundreds summoned at a public square, Daskaloyiannis did not betray his people.

Neither the failed revolt of 1770 AD nor the death of Daskaloyiannis went in vain since both events aroused the national sentiments of all Cretans. The revolts made by the Cretans and the legendary Sfakians contributed to the rise of the independent Cretan state in 1898, which also paved the way for Crete’s union with Greece in 1912.

== The Sfakian dialect ==
The Sfakian dialect is similar to other Cretan dialects, and yet it is also quite different. Like many other Cretan dialects, /k/, /ɡ/, /x/, and /ɣ/ before front vowels become [tʃ], [dʒ], [ʃ], and [ʒ]. However, one oddity present in the Sfakian dialect is how it treats /l/. Before an /i/ or an /e/, ⟨λ⟩ is a lateral [l]. However, before an /a/, /o/, or /u/, it becomes an approximant [ɹ], much like the English "r" sound. For example, "θάλασσα" (thalassa, meaning "sea") is pronounced by a Sfakian as [ˈθaɹasa], but πουλί (pouli, meaning bird) is [pouˈli], closer to standard Greek. This feature is not shared anywhere else outside of Crete, except for certain villages in the Aegean, including the village of Apiranthos on the Cyladic island of Naxos. Indeed, the Sfakians believe that hundreds of years ago, probably after the Ottoman conquest of Constantinople, a group of Sfakians left Crete and came to Apiranthos on Naxos. The cultures of Sfakia and Apiranthos bear many striking similarities, not least of which includes the aforementioned dialectal peculiarity.

== Notable Sfakians ==
- Georgios Tsontos, general and politician
- Emmanouil Manousogiannakis, general
- Manousos Voloudakis, Greek politician and Member of the Hellenic Parliament.
