= Aradaina =

Village in Chania, Greece

Coordinates: 35°13′24″N 24°03′44″E

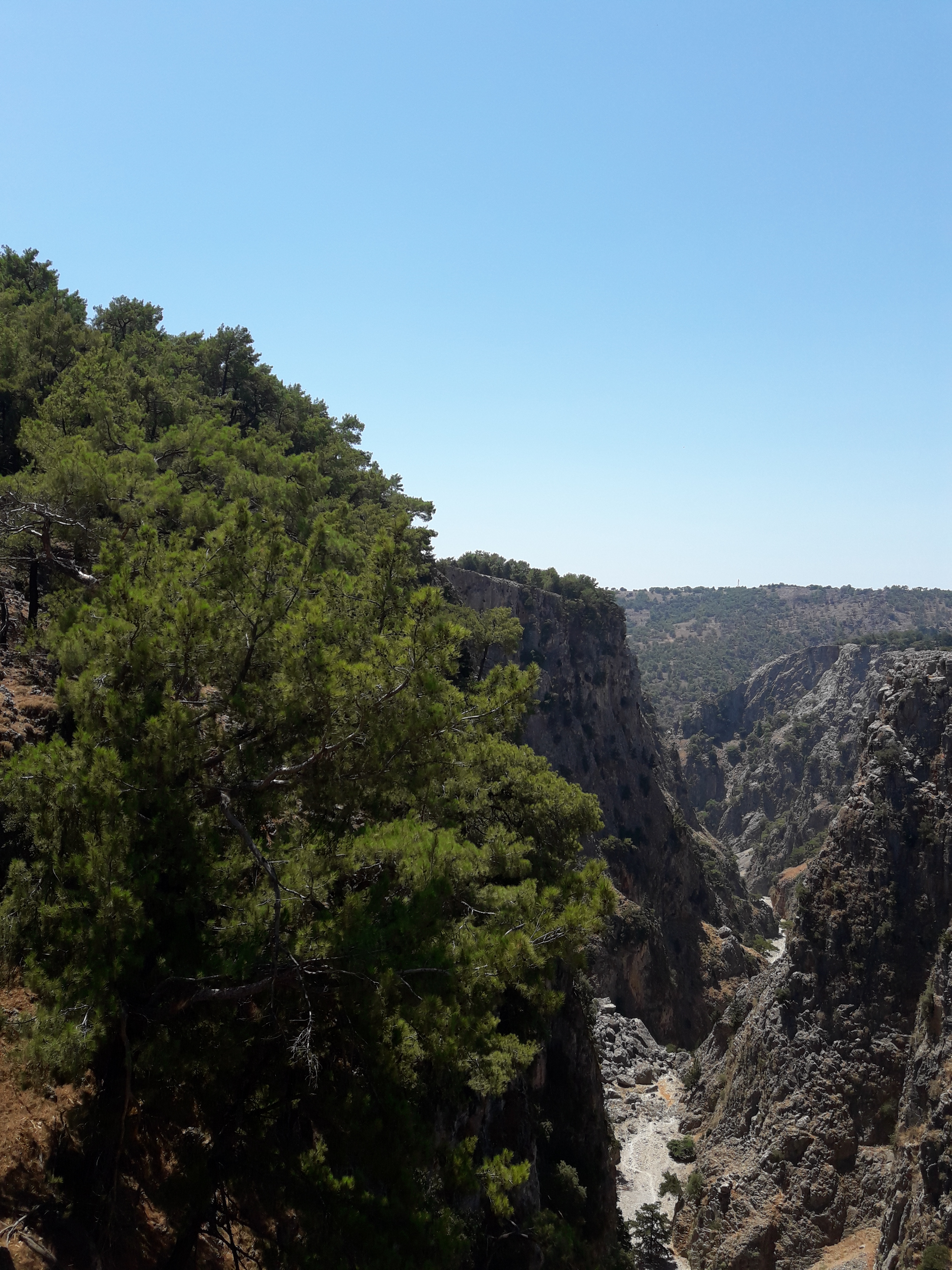
The Gorge of Aradaina

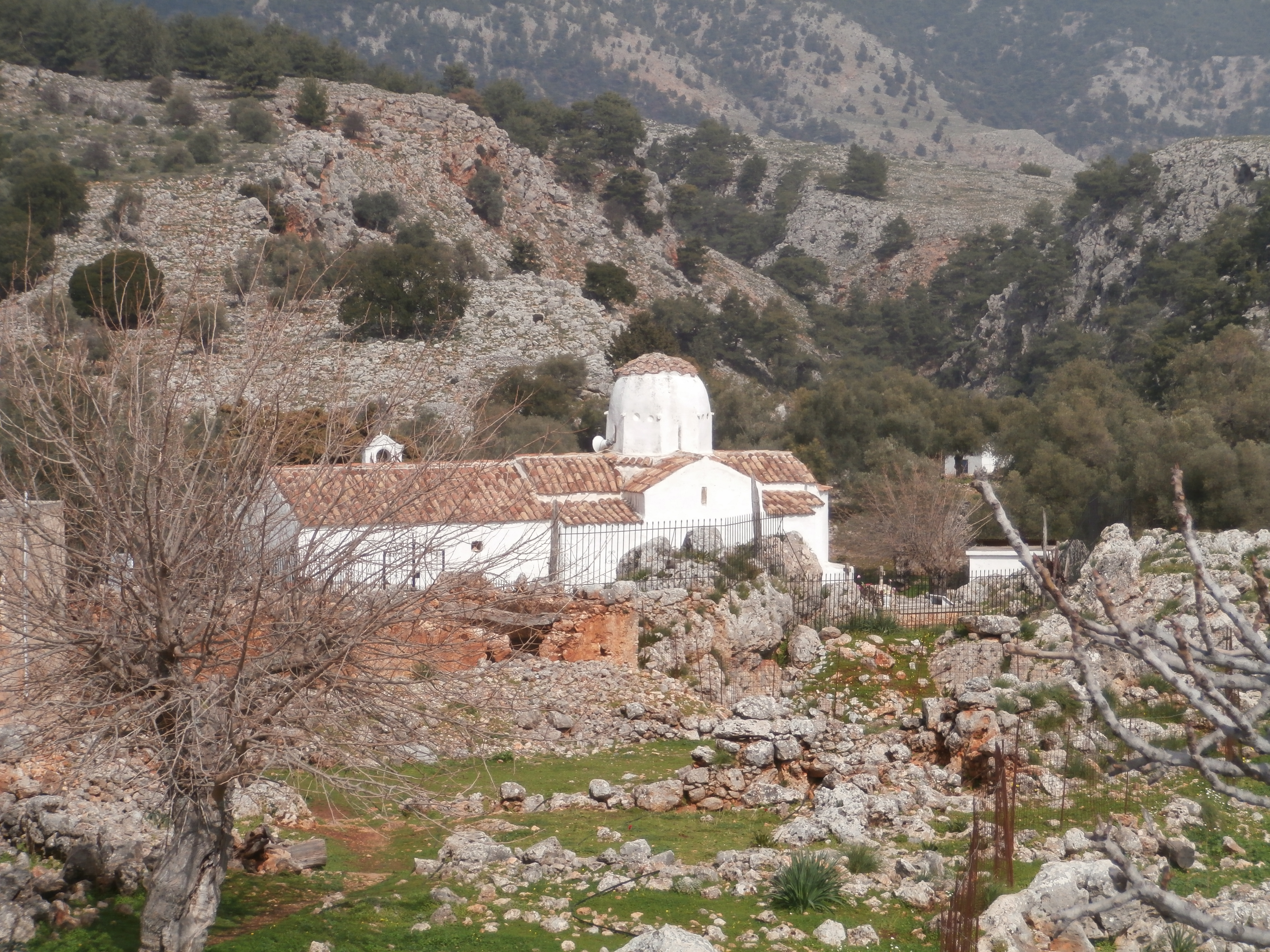
The St. Michael church

Aradaina (or Aradena) is a village in Greece located in the Agios Ioannis Community of the Sfakia municipality in the Chania Regional Unit of Crete. According to the 2011 census it has 4 residents.

== Geography ==
Aradaina is located at an altitude of 520 meters, on the southern hillside of the Lefka Ori mountains. The village is located near the gorge of the same name, which is west of it and has a depth of around 100 meters. The gorge divides Aradena from the Anopolis Plateau. Aradaina is 3.5 kilometers apart from the larger village of Anopolis.

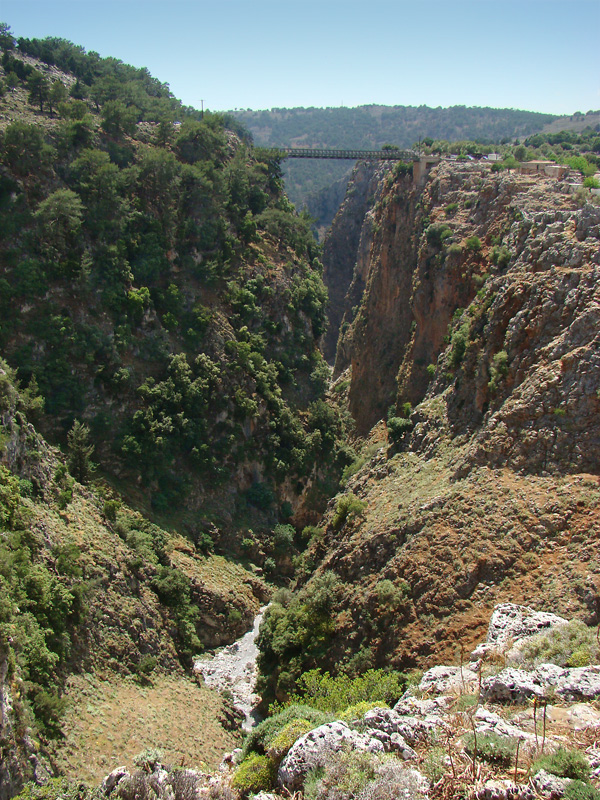
The Gorge of Aradaina

== History ==
At Passopetra, near the current settlement, the ruins of the ancient city of Aradin or Iradin (from which the name of the village derives to this day) are preserved. Stergios Spanakis mentions that it was founded by Phoenicians and the name Aradin is etymologically derived from the Phoenician word aruad, which means shelter. According to Vladimir Georgiev, the name Aradin comes from the word arados, which means commotion or violent movement, and which refers to the waves that could be heard up to the city. It was one of the 30 Cretan cities that had entered into an alliance with Eumenes II in 183 BC. The ancient necropolis is preserved at the site of Xenotifi and for portage the ships docked at Phoinika (today's Loutro). It continued to exist in Byzantine times, as it is mentioned by Hierocles, and it is possible that it was populated continuously in the first and second Byzantine periods, as it is mentioned in the documents regarding the determination of the possessions of the 12 aristocrats. In the village, the church of Michael the Archangel is preserved, which was built at the beginning of the 14th century in the place of the middle aisle of an early Christian basilica, which was the seat of a bishop.

Aradena, although a mountain village, prospered thanks to shipping and trade, with its inhabitants docking their ships in Loutro. It prospered from the end of the Venetian times until the unsuccessful revolution of Daskalogiannis in 1770. Daskalogiannis fought his last battle in the gorge of Aradena, which was completely destroyed. During the revolution of 1821, Hatzi Georgis Maniatis and Anagnostis Manouselis with a few of their companions were isolated in Aradaina, where they were killed fighting for Hussein and the Turkish-Egyptian army. On August 11, 1867, during the revolution of 1866, a battle was fought in the gorge of Aradaina between Cretans and Turks, which ended with the retreat of Cretans, due to sea cannon fire from Turkish ships.

== Demographics ==
Aradena is not mentioned in the Venetian censuses, like the other villages of Sfakia, but the toponym Aradhena is mentioned by Francesco Barozzi and it is also mentioned in the list of villages of Crete in 1645, by Antonio Trivan.

Aradaina is mentioned in the Egyptian census of 1834, when it was inhabited by 36 Christian families.

In the 1881 census, Aradena belonged to the municipality of Agios Ioannis and had 124 inhabitants. The village was deserted during the 1950s due to a feud. Detailed demographic progress of the village, from 1900 onwards, according to the censuses:

Census	1900	1920	1928	1940	1951	1961	1971	1981	1991	2001	2011
Population	188	180	146	140	36	44	13	8		5	4

== Transportation ==
Aradena was cut off from the road network until 1987, when a 70-meter long iron bridge over the Aradena gorge was built with the financing of the Vardinogiannis family - which has roots with the place. The bridge was inaugurated on December 28, 1986. In the middle of the bridge there is a platform for bungee jumping, as from the bottom of the gorge, the bridge is 138 meters high.

Also, Aradaina communicates via buses with Chora Sfakion from KTEL Chanion-Rethymnou.
