= Kyriakoulis =

Kyriakoulis is a given name. Notable people with the name include:

- Kyriakoulis Mavromichalis
- Kyriakoulis Mavromichalis (military commander)
- Kyriakoulis Argyrokastritis
