= Panellinion (steamship) =

Steamship Panellinion
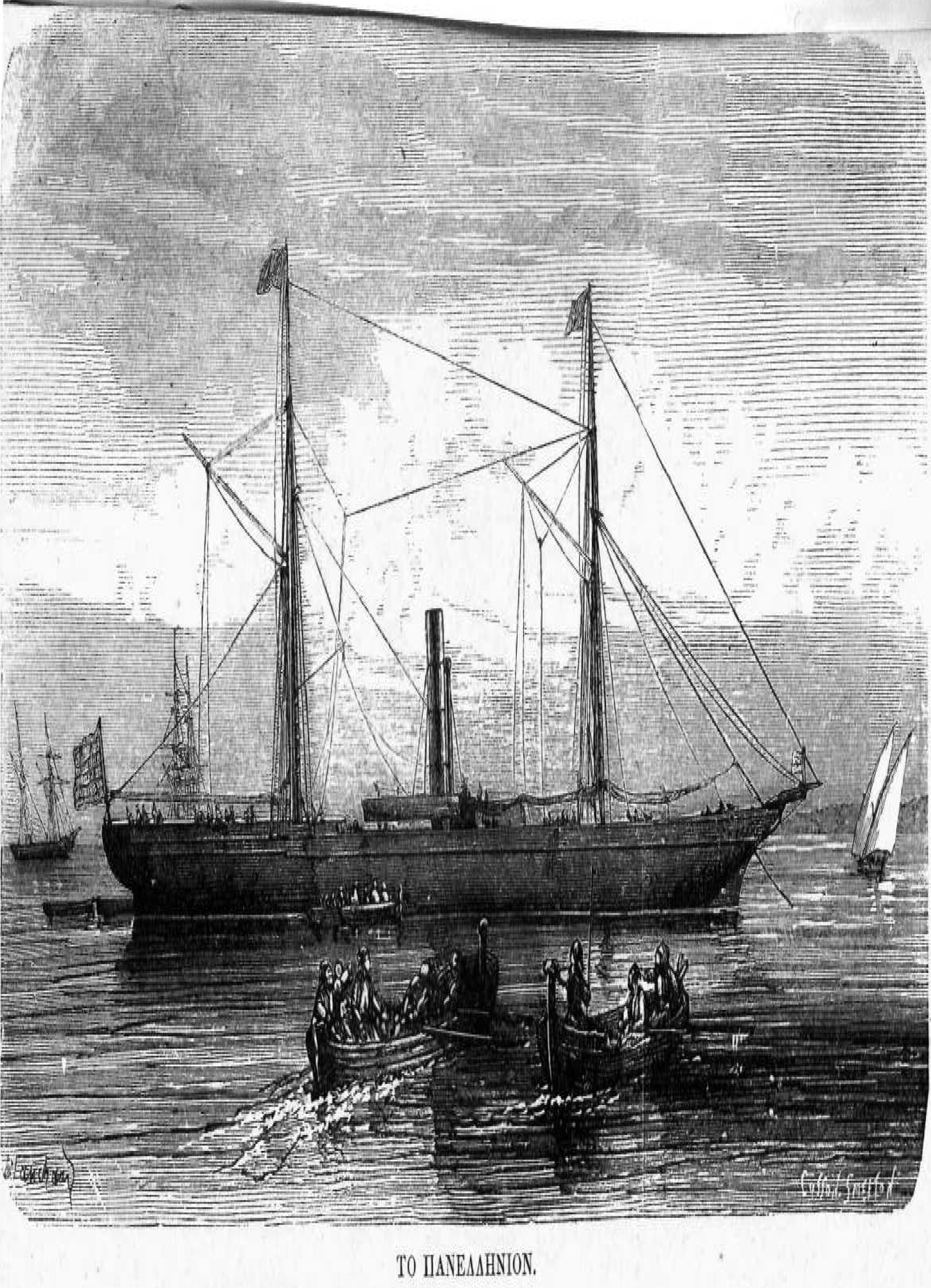

History

Greece
- Laid down: 1855
- Commissioned: 1857

General characteristics
- Displacement: 310 tons
- Length: 47,5 m
- Beam: 6,6 m
- Propulsion: Steam 94 hp
- Speed: 11 knots

The steamship Panellinion (Greek: Πανελλήνιον) was one of the first Greek ships of its kind with a propeller, used initially as a postal ship, later as an auxiliary warship, and finally as a merchant ship for almost half a century. The ship had a distinguished career and rose to fame in the country.

== Shipbuilding ==
Built in 1855, during the reign of King Otto, it was part of the efforts to modernize and renew the Royal Greek Navy. The ship was built in the Henderson ship yards under the supervision of G. Tombazis. It had two masts and a chimney. Its speed reached 11 knots.

After this ship was built, another four were ordered creating the most advanced fleet of its kind in the Eastern Mediterranean and were used for the postal service:

- Hydra
- Arkadi
- Kriti
- Enosi

With the arrival of the Panellinion and her sister ships in 1857, a special contract was signed with the then new Hellenic Steamships company of Ermoupolis to undertake seaborne transportation which until then barely existed.

== Cretan revolt of 1866 ==
During the reign of King George I, a revolution began in Crete in 1866. Panellinion along with Hydra were equipped at the Syros shipyard with two guns each and were immediately used to break the Ottoman blockade of Crete as well as with the delivery of troops and supplies. Due to the restricted capacity, these two ships were later replaced by Arkadi, Kriti, and Enosi.

During this revolution, Panellinion conducted a total of nine missions and several smaller reconnaissance patrols. In the three years of service in the revolution, its commanders were N. Sachtouris, B. Orloff, and N. Angelikaris.

On 1 October 1866, after the Panellinion delivered a squad of volunteers under the command of major Charalambos Zymvrakakis and supplies in Loutro, it was engaged by the Ottoman coast guard. However, it managed to escape by cutting its anchor off.

== Cretan Revolt (1878) ==
During the 1878 revolution in Crete, Panellinion played a similar role and completed 17 missions. Its commanders during this period were N. Sourmelis and N. Drivas.

== Sources ==
- Μεγάλη Στρατιωτική και Ναυτική Εγκυκλοπαίδεια (in Greek). Vol. Ν–Σ. p. 248.
