= Cretan Republic =

Cretan Republic can refer to:

1. the republic declared in 1362 during the Sfakian rebellion;
2. the Cretan State (1898–1913).
