= Hatzimichalis Dalianis =

Greek revolutionary leader

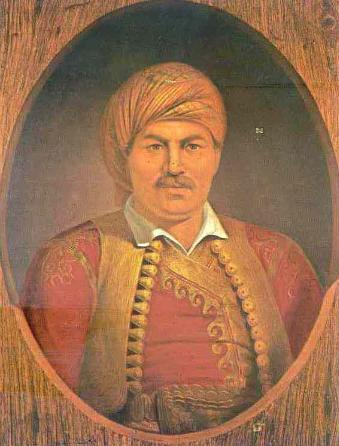
- A portrait of Hatzimichalis Dalianis
- Native name: Χατζημιχάλης Νταλιάνης
- Born: c. 1775; Delvinaki or Premeti or Vouliarates, Pashalik of Yanina, Ottoman Empire (now Albania and Greece)
- Died: 17 March 1828 (aged 52–53) Sfakia, Eyalet of Crete, Ottoman Empire (now Greece)
- Allegiance: (Greece) First Hellenic Republic
- Branch: Hellenic Army
- Service years: 1821–1828
- Conflicts: Greek War of Independence; Battle of Phaleron; Battle of Frangokastello †
- Other work: Member of the Filiki Etaireia

Hatzimichalis Dalianis (Greek: Χατζημιχάλης Νταλιάνης, 1775 – 17 March 1828) was a Greek revolutionary leader of the Greek War of Independence and commander in Crete in 1828.

== Early life ==
According to some Greek historians, the Greek speaking towns of Argyrokastro, Vouliarates, Premeti, and Delvinaki argue over his origin. Some believe he was born in the Greek-speaking town of Delvinaki, Epirus, when the region was under Ottoman rule. Consequent research, however, by other Greek historians disputes this fact. Nevertheless, all agree that he was born in Epirus. Alexander Mammopoulos attributes his birthplace to an Albanian-speaking village of the same name in modern Përmet District, while Stavros Karkaletsis, claims that he was born in the Greek-speaking village of Bularat, in Dropull.

He grew up in Trieste, where his father worked as a merchant. In 1816 he became a member of the Greek patriotic organization Filiki Etaireia.

== Greek War of Independence ==
In March 1826, while the War of Independence was in full swing, he participated, together with other revolutionary leaders, in an attempt to create an alliance with the Emir of Lebanon, Bashir Shihab II, against the Ottoman Empire. However, when Dalianis landed in Beirut to incite a revolt there, the local emir was far from certain that he would defy the Ottomans.

Back in Greece, Dalianis fought in the Battle of Phaleron (1827). In January 1828, he became the leader of an expeditionary force to assist the faltering uprising in Crete. In an attempt to revive the revolution there, Dalianis, with 700 men (600 on foot, 100 with horses and mules), landed initially at Gramvousa on 5 January 1828, but decided to restart their expedition from Sfakia. In March, he took possession of Frangokastello castle, a 14th-century Venetian fortification in the Sfakia region. The Korçë-born Ottoman Albanian ruler, Mustafa Naili Pasha, gathered an army of 8,000 men in order to suppress the revolt. The castle's defence was doomed when Mustafa's Ottoman force of 8,000 men and 300 cavalry arrived on 13 May 1828. After several days, the fortress fell back into Ottoman hands, and Dalianis perished along with 385 men. Mustafa's force also lost 800 men. The few men who remained at the fort continued to resist for a few more days.

It is said that Hatzimichalis Dalianis was buried by a nun at the nearby monastery of Saint Charalambos. Mustafa's Turkish troops were ambushed on their return at a nearby gorge by a group of Cretan freedom fighters from Sfakia and suffered around 1,000 casualties.

== Legacy ==
This failed revolt of 1828, is the basis for the local legend of the ghost army of the Drosoulites (Δροσουλίτες, "dew shadows"). According to the local Cretan tradition, the spirits of the fallen revolutionaries return each year to Frangokastello. This unexplained phenomenon usually occurs on the anniversary of the battle where images of advancing troops (Drosoulites) appear at dawn to hover above the tragic location. The subject has been investigated and various scientific interpretations have been suggested.

Later, in the early 20th century, volunteer groups from Crete, in order to repay the sacrifice of Dalianis and his Epirote men in 1828, joined the Epirus front of the First Balkan War, as well as the armed struggle for the establishment of the Autonomous Republic of Northern Epirus, against annexation to Albania.

== Sources ==
- Detorakis, Theocharis (1988). "Η Τουρκοκρατία στην Κρήτη ("Turkish rule in Crete")". In Panagiotakis, Nikolaos M. (in Greek). Crete, History and Civilization. II. Vikelea Library, Association of Regional Associations of Regional Municipalities. pp. 333–436.
