= Kotsifos Gorge =

Coordinates: 35.221°N 24.401°E

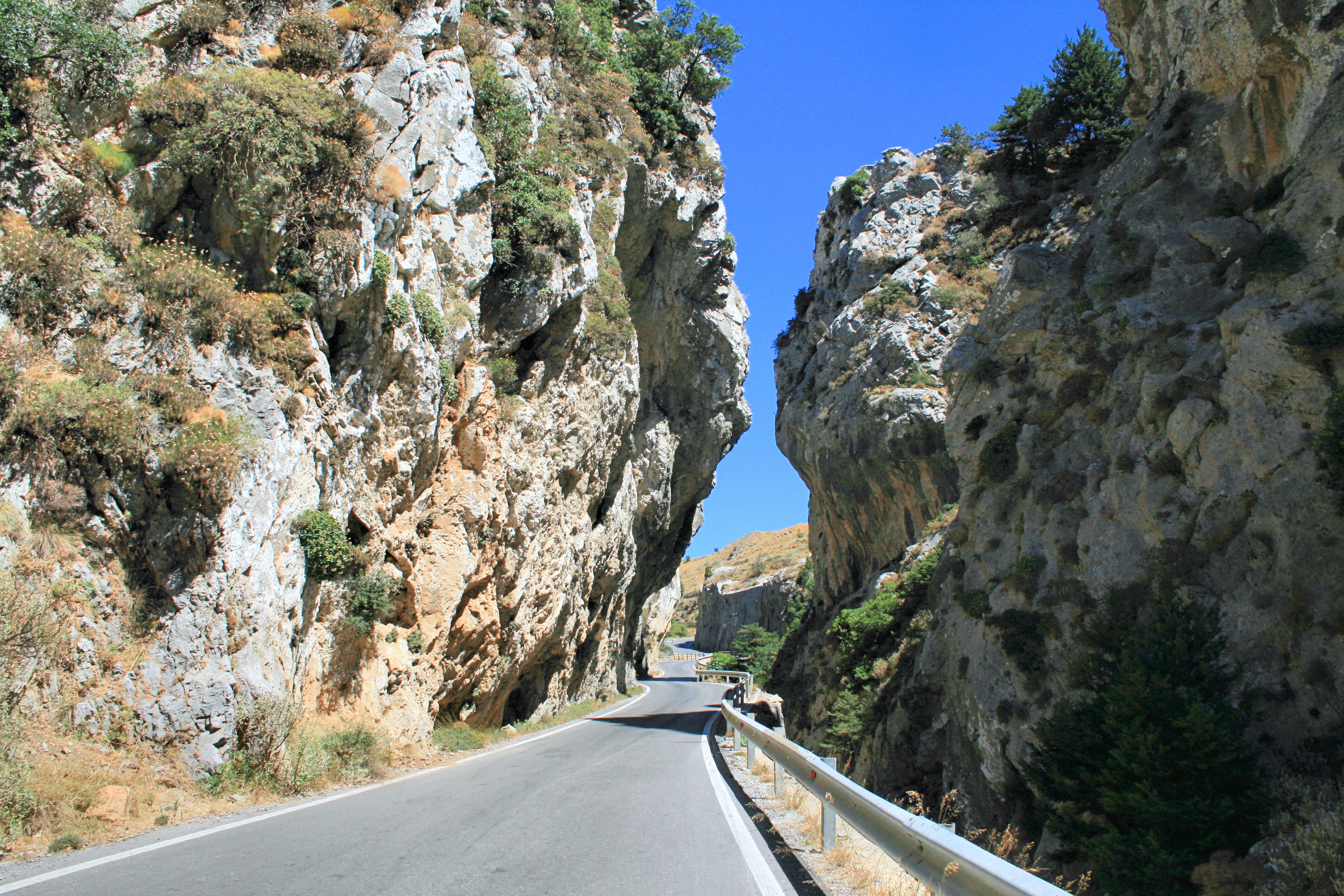
In the Kotsifos Gorge

The Kotsifos Gorge (Greek: Φαράγγι Κοτσιφού) is a gorge on the southern side of the western part of the island of Crete. It is situated west of the mountain of Kouroupa, north of the town of Plakias, and on the road between Sellia and Angouseliana. It is noted for the high number of Cretan endemic plant species that grow there.

== See also ==
- Kourtaliotiko Gorge
