= Mustafa Naili Pasha =

Grand Vizier of the Ottoman Empire (1853–1854, 1857)

Giritli Mustafa Naili Pasha
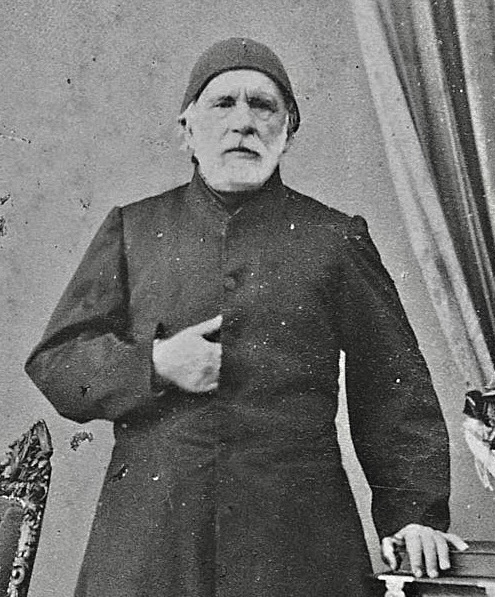

Wali of Crete
- In office 1830–1851
- Preceded by: Mehmed Zehrab Pasha
- Succeeded by: Salih Vamık Pasha
- In office 1866–1867
- Preceded by: Hekim Ismail Pasha
- Succeeded by: Hüseyin Avni Pasha

Grand Vizier
- In office May 14, 1853 – May 29, 1854
- In office August 2, 1857 – October 23, 1857
- Preceded by: Mustafa Reşid Pasha
- Succeeded by: Mustafa Reşid Pasha

Personal details
- Born: 1798 Pojan, Sanjak of Görice, Ottoman Empire
- Died: 1871 (aged 72–73) Istanbul, Ottoman Empire
- Profession: Statesman

Military service
- Battles/wars: Cretan revolt (1866–1869)

Mustafa Naili Pasha (Ottoman Turkish: مصطفى نايلي باشا or Giritli Mustafa Naili Pasha, literally "Mustafa Naili Pasha of Crete"; 1798–1871) was an Ottoman-Albanian statesman, who held the office of Grand Vizier during the reign of Abdülmecid I, the first time between 14 May 1853 and 29 May 1854, and the second time between 6 August 1857 and 22 October 1857.

His office of Grand Vizier has been marked by the tensions between the Ottoman Empire and the Russian Empire. His first period of office coincides with the immediate eve of the start of the Crimean War and his second, with the aftermath of that war.

== Biography ==
He was raised and started his career in Egypt under the protection of the Albanian ruler Kavalalı Mehmed Ali Pasha and was of Albanian descent like the founder of modern Egypt. He suppressed a rebellion of Cretan Greeks during the troubles of the 1820s in various Aegean Islands in league with the Greek War of Independence and subsequently (in 1832) was appointed governor to Crete. On 18 May 1828 he regained Frangokastello (in Crete), to Ottoman control, from Hatzimichalis Dalianis. The Ottoman sultan, Mahmud II, who had been caught unprepared and without an army of his own (having suppressed the Janissaries), had been forced to seek the aid of his rebellious vassal and rival in Egypt. As of 1832, when Mustafa Naili Pasha got appointed governor of Crete which was under the domains of Mehmet Ali Pasha, he already had been present on the rebellious island for four years, which is why Ottoman records immediately refer to him as "Giritli" (the Cretan).

His rule attempted to create a synthesis between the Muslim landowners and the emergent Christian commercial classes. Mustafa Naili Pasha's rule has been generally cautious, pro-British, and he has tried harder to win the support of the Cretan Greeks (having married the daughter of a priest and allowed her to remain Christian) than the Cretan Turks. In 1834, however, a Cretan committee was already set up in Athens to work for the union of the island with Greece.

In 1840, Egypt was forced by Palmerston to return Crete to direct Ottoman rule. For a time, Mustafa Naili Pasha angled unsuccessfully to become a semi-independent prince but the Cretan Greeks rose up against him, once more driving the Muslims temporarily into siege in the towns. An Anglo-Ottoman naval operation restored control in the island and Mustafa Naili Pasha was confirmed as its governor, though under command from Istanbul. He remained in Crete until 1851 when he was summoned to the capital, where at a relatively advanced age he pursued a successful career.

== See also ==
- List of Ottoman grand viziers

Preceded by Mustafa Reshid Pasha	Grand Vizier; 2 August 1857 - 23 October 1857	Succeeded by Mustafa Reshid Pasha
