= Georgios Tsontos =

Greek general and politician

- Γεώργιος Τσόντος
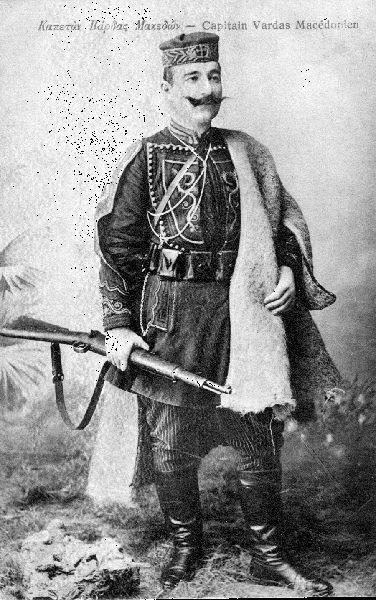
- Georgios Tsontos c. 1908-09

Minister Governor-General of Crete
- In office 10 October – 30 November 1935
- Monarch: George II
- Prime Minister: Georgios Kondylis

Member of Parliament for Kastoria Prefecture
- In office 1933–1935
- President: Alexandros Zaimis
- Prime Minister: Panagis Tsaldaris

Member of Parliament for Florina Prefecture
- In office 1932–1933
- President: Alexandros Zaimis
- Prime Minister: Panagis Tsaldaris; Eleftherios Venizelos; Alexandros Othonaios

Personal details
- Born: c. 1871 Sfakia, Eyalet of Crete, Ottoman Empire (now Greece)
- Died: 1942 Athens, Hellenic State
- Resting place: First Cemetery of Athens
- Education: Hellenic Army Academy
- Nickname(s): Kapetan Vardas; Καπετάν Βάρδας

Military service
- Allegiance: Kingdom of Greece; Aut. Rep. of Northern Epirus; Second Hellenic Republic
- Branch/service: Hellenic Army
- Years of service: 1893-1917; 1920-1923; 1927; 1935
- Rank: Lieutenant General
- Commands: Commandant of the Hellenic Military Academy; Garrison Commander of Athens
- Battles/wars: Greco-Turkish War (1897); Cretan Revolt; Macedonian Struggle; Balkan Wars; First Balkan War; Second Balkan War; North Epirote Struggle

Georgios Tsontos (Greek: Γεώργιος Τσόντος) (c. 1871–1942) also known with the nom de guerre Kapetan Vardas (Καπετάν Βάρδας), was a Greek guerrilla fighter, general, and later politician from Crete.

== Early life ==
Georgios Tsontos was born in the village of Askifou in Sfakia, Crete, Ottoman Empire in about 1871. His father Charalambos had distinguished himself as a rebel leader during the Cretan Revolt (1866–69) against the Ottoman Empire, was assassinated in Athens in 1874. Georgios entered the Hellenic Military Academy in 1888, graduating in 1893 as an Artillery Second Lieutenant.

== Military career ==
In the Greco-Turkish War of 1897, he participated in the Greek expeditionary force to Crete under Colonel Timoleon Vassos. There he would assist in the Cretan Revolt (1897-1898) which would lead to the establishment of the Cretan State.

In 1904 he went to Ottoman-ruled Macedonia as part of the Macedonian Struggle, and spent two and a half years leading guerrilla detachments in the Monastir area to fight the Ottomans and Bulgarian Komitadjis. It was in Macedonia where operated under the nom de guerre of Kapetan Vardas. He also fought in the Balkan Wars of 1912–13 as a captain. In the Second Balkan War against Bulgaria in particular, he once more led irregular forces to clear out eastern Macedonia from Bulgarian irregulars (Komitadjis).

In 1914 he temporarily resigned his commission to join the armed forces of the Autonomous Republic of Northern Epirus. During the North Epirote autonomy, he was named military and civil governor of Korytsa. During World War I, he organized guerrilla groups in Northern Epirus in order to operate against Albanian bands that were raiding the Greek populated areas In the National Schism, he supported the monarchists, and as a result found himself dismissed from the army in 1917–20.

== Later career ==
Following the electoral victory of the monarchists in November 1920 he was reinstated, and served as commandant of the Hellenic Military Academy and garrison commander of Athens. He retired from the army in February 1923 with the rank of major general. He was restored to inactive service in 1927 and finally in 1935, reaching the rank of lieutenant general.

He also served as MP for Florina Prefecture in 1932-33 and for Kastoria Prefecture in 1933-35. He died in Athens in 1942.
