= Kouroupa =

Mountain in Agios Vasileios municipality, Rethymno, Greece

Coordinates: 35°13′N 24°26′E

Kouroupa (Greek: Κουρούπα) is a mountain in western Crete. Its summit is 984 metres above sea level. To the east of the mountain lies Kourtaliotiko Gorge. The summit, its telecoms masts and chapel are accessed by an unsurfaced road up from Atsipades village on the northern side of the mountain. On the southern side of the mountain are the villages of Asomatos and Mirthios.
