= Frangokastello =

Settlement in Crete, Greece

- Φραγκοκάστελλο
- Frangokastello, Crete
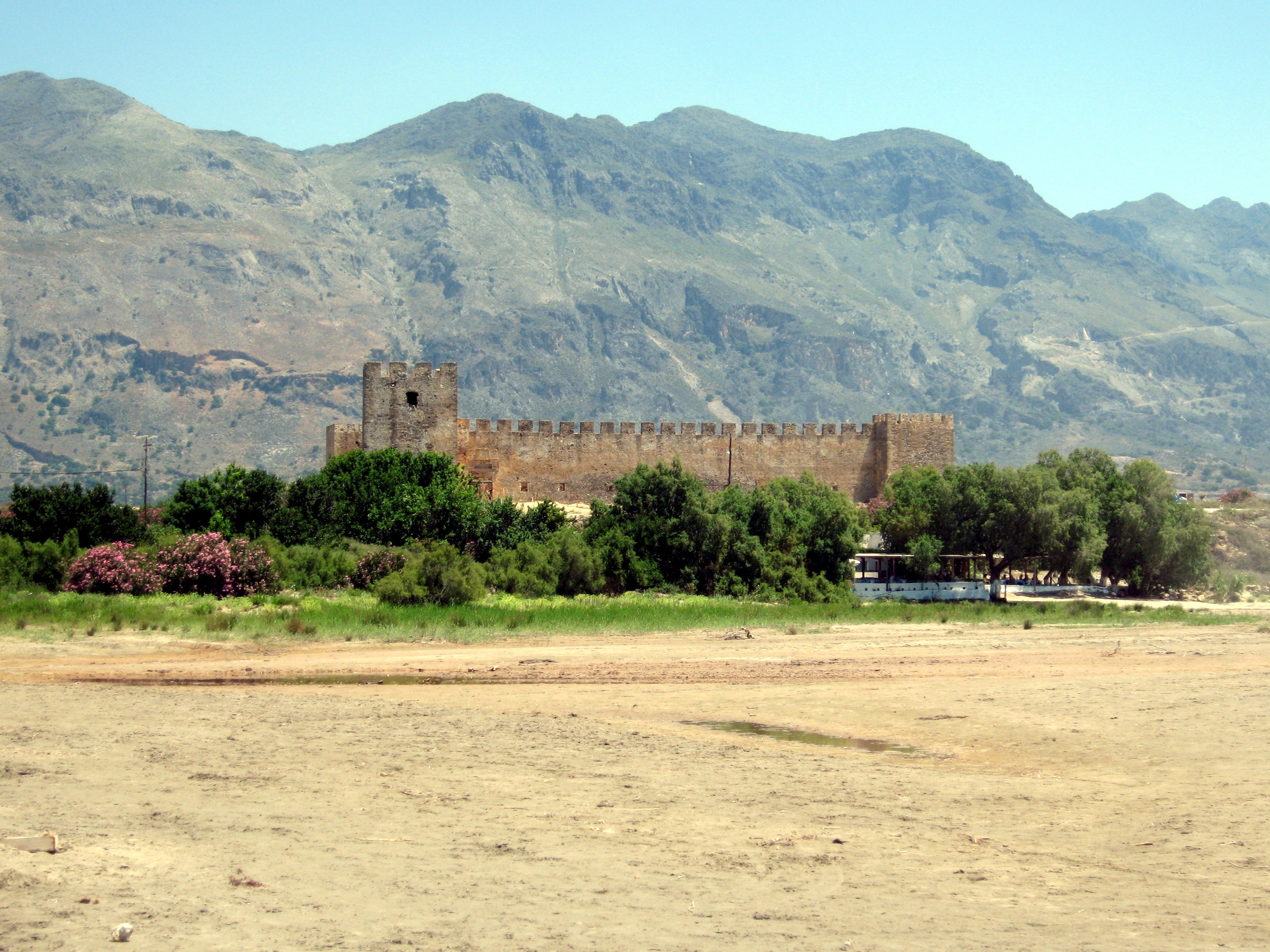
- Frangokastello castle (2007)

Site information
- Type: castle
- Owner: Greek Ministry of Culture
- Controlled by: Venetian Republic 1371–1669; Ottoman Empire 1669–1830; Egypt 1830–1840; Ottoman Empire 1840–1898; Cretan State 1898–1913
- Open to the public: Yes
- Condition: ruin

Location
- Coordinates: 35.18205°N 24.23414°E

Site history
- Built by: Venetian Republic
- Materials: hewn stone (ashlar)

Frangokastello (Greek: Φραγκοκάστελλο) is the location of a castle and scattered settlement on the south coast of Crete, Greece, about 12 km (7.5 miles) east of Chora Sfakion and within the prefecture of Chania.

Frangokastello has an extensive, sheltered and gently shelving sandy beach, which has provided the basis for a low key tourist industry in recent years. Tourist accommodation is scattered over the flat plain around the castle, but the area's relative remoteness has discouraged major development.

== History ==
The castle was built by the Venetians in 1371–1374 as a garrison to impose order on the rebellious Sfakia region, to deter pirates, and to protect Venetian nobles and their properties. The Venetians named it the Castle of St. Nikitas after the nearby church. The locals, however, who never saw it in a positive light, contemptuously dubbed it Frangokastello, meaning the Castle of the Franks (i.e. Catholic foreigners), Castelfranco or Franco Castello. The name eventually stuck and was adopted by the Venetians as well. According to local lore, when soldiers and builders arrived on the fertile plain to begin construction of the castle, the local Sfakians, led by six Patsos brothers from the nearby settlement of Patsianos, would destroy every night what the Venetians built during the day. Eventually, the Venetians were forced to bring in additional troops and the Patsos brothers were betrayed, arrested and hanged.

The castle has a simple rectangular shape, with a tower at each corner and the remains of a Venetian coat of arms above the main gate. The buildings within the walls, as well as the battlements, were constructed during the Ottoman Turkish occupation.

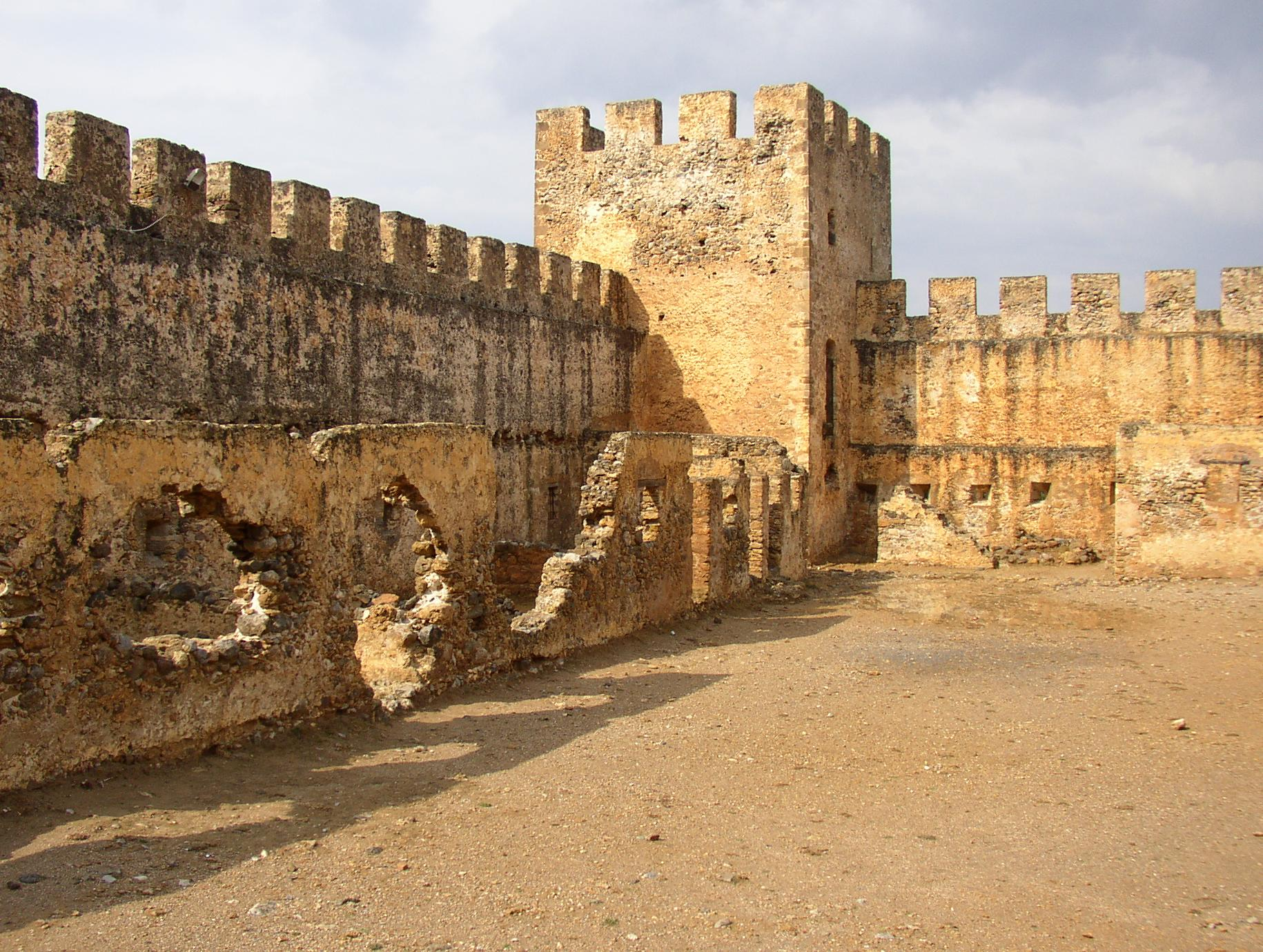
Inside the castle

In 1770, the Cretan rebel Ioannis Vlachos, otherwise known as Daskalogiannis, was captured at Frangokastello by Turkish forces. He was later tortured and executed at Heraklion.

On 17 May 1828 a celebrated battle was fought at Frangokastello. Hundreds of Sfakiots and Epirotes led by Hatzimichalis Dalianis, a Greek patriot from Epirus attempting to spread the Greek War of Independence from the mainland to Crete, occupied the castle, but were besieged by the Turks and massacred. However, many of the Turks were then themselves killed by rebel ambushes launched from the local gorges. According to tradition, around the anniversary of the battle each May, shadows of the armed Cretan and Epirote soldiers who lost their lives there seem to march towards the fortress around dawn. These are called Drosoulites (Greek: Δροσουλίτες), or dew-men, and have been explained as a meteorological phenomenon.
