= Hora Sfakion =

Town in Crete, Greece

Chora Sfakion Χώρα Σφακίων
- Community
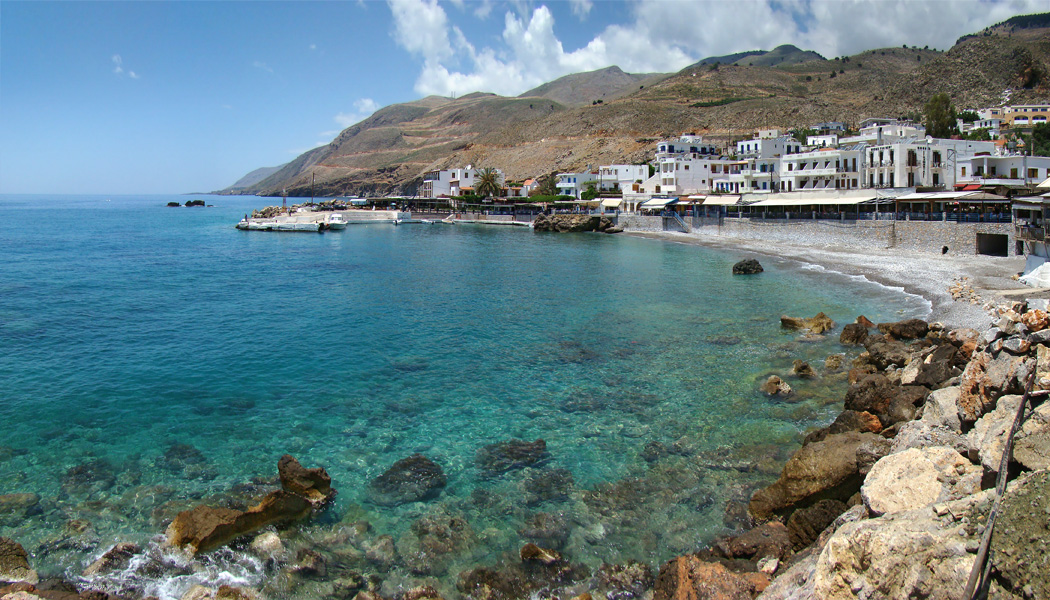

- Location within Greece
- Coordinates: 35°12′03″N 24°08′14″E
- Country: Greece
- Administrative region: Crete
- Regional unit: Chania
- Municipality: Sfakia

Population (2021)
  - Community: 322
- Time zone: UTC+2 (EET)
  - Summer (DST): UTC+3 (EEST)

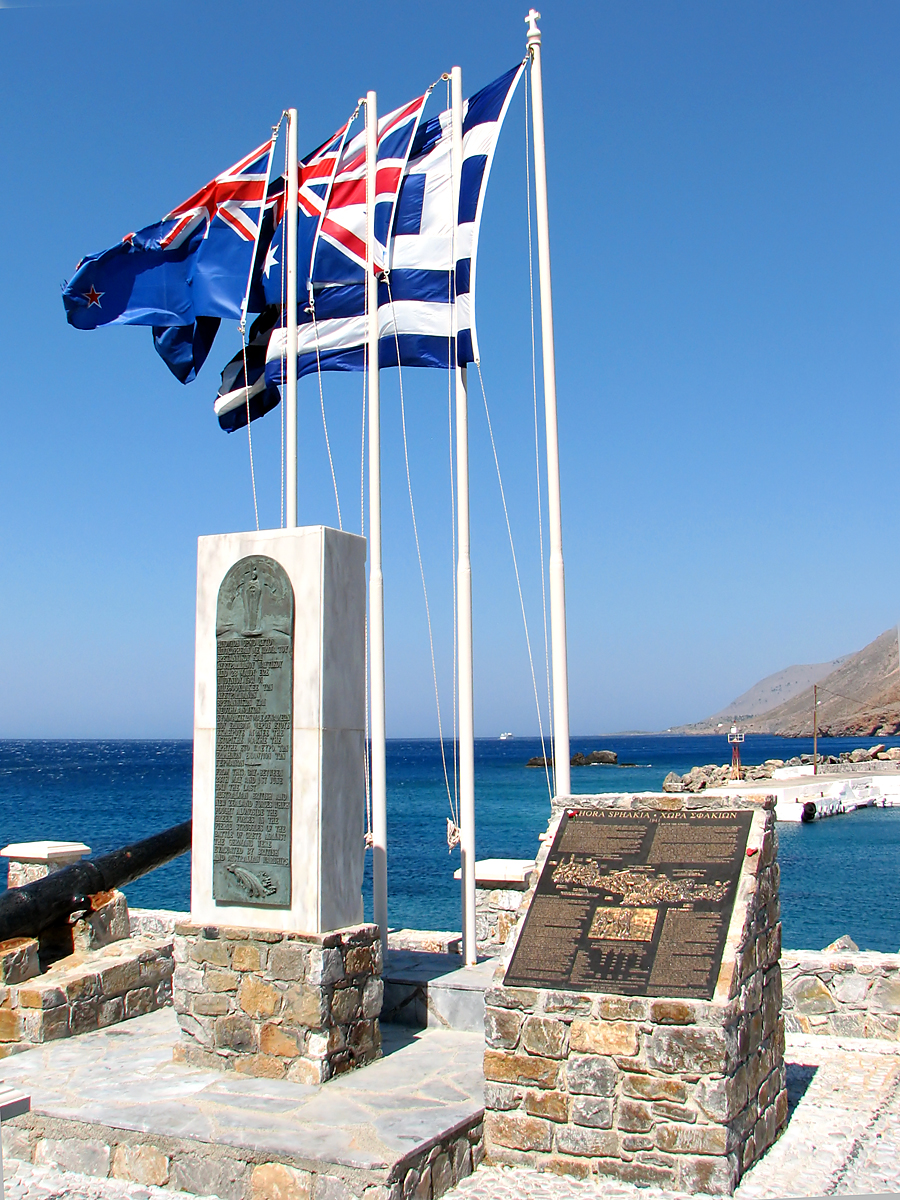
Monument commemorating the evacuation during WW2 of British and ANZAC forces from Hora Sfakion in May 1941. Click on the left plaque for a closer view

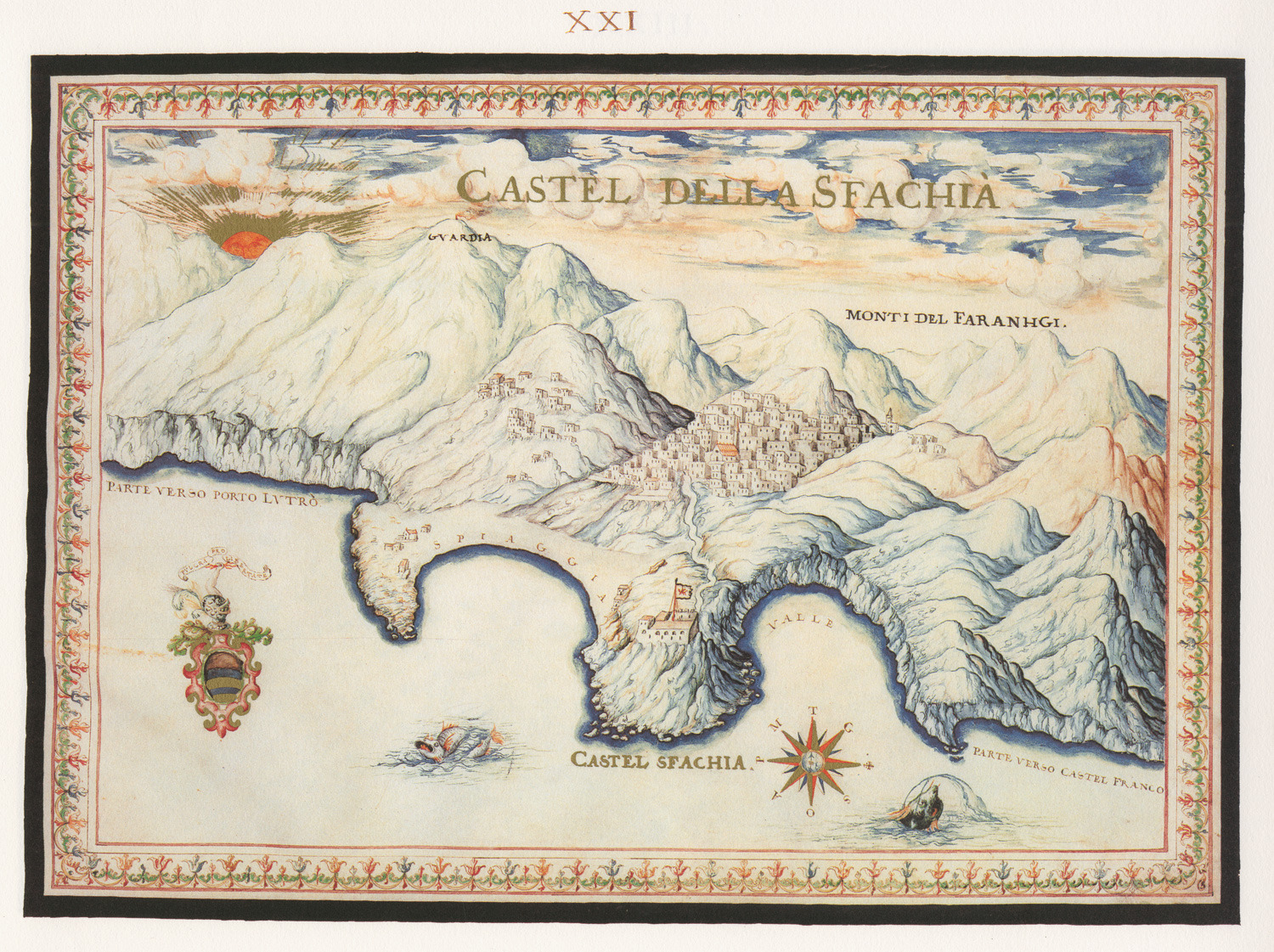
Sfakia castle by Basilicata

Hóra Sfakíon (Greek: Χώρα Σφακίων) or simply Sfakia (Σφακιά [sfaˈca]) is a small town on the south coast of Crete, Greece. It is the capital of the remote and mountainous region of Sfakiá, and has just 322 inhabitants (according to the 2021 census). It lies on the south coast near the end of the Imbros Gorge, 74 km south of Chania. It has two small harbours, where the ferry boats from Agia Roumeli dock, which in the summer bring the hikers from the Samaria Gorge to ride buses back to the northern coast. From Hóra Sfakíon, ferries also sail to the nearby coastal village of Loutro and Gavdos island.

Hóra Sfakíon is a small village with a main harbourfront of tavernas, two minimarkets, a butcher shop, and a bakery. There is a quiet local beach next to the west side of the village, and several pebbly beaches nearby. Hóra Sfakíon has a variety of tourist accommodations: rooms, studios, and apartments. The local economy is based on tourism, fishing, olive oil production, and sheep and goat herding.

Hóra Sfakíon prospered during the Venetian and Ottoman occupations and up to the 18th century carried on a flourishing trade with its own small fleet. It was said to have had a hundred churches, but it suffered badly from wartime bombardment during the Battle of Crete and the Allied naval evacuation that followed.

Hóra Sfakíon is known as one of the centres of resistance against the occupying forces of both the Venetians and the Ottomans. The impenetrable White Mountains to the north combined with the rocky beaches on the south helped the locals fight off all invaders. Anopolis, a village near Hóra Sfakíon, is the birthplace of Daskalogiannis, one of the most celebrated Cretan revolutionaries.

== See also ==
- Battle of Crete
- Sfakians

== Gallery ==
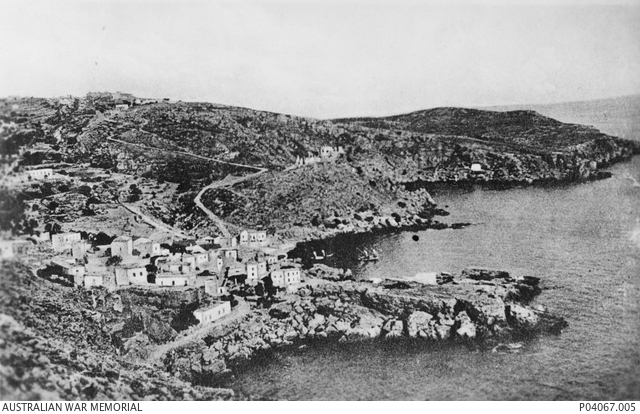
Thousands of Allied troops were evacuated from Hóra Sfakíon after the Battle of Crete in 1941

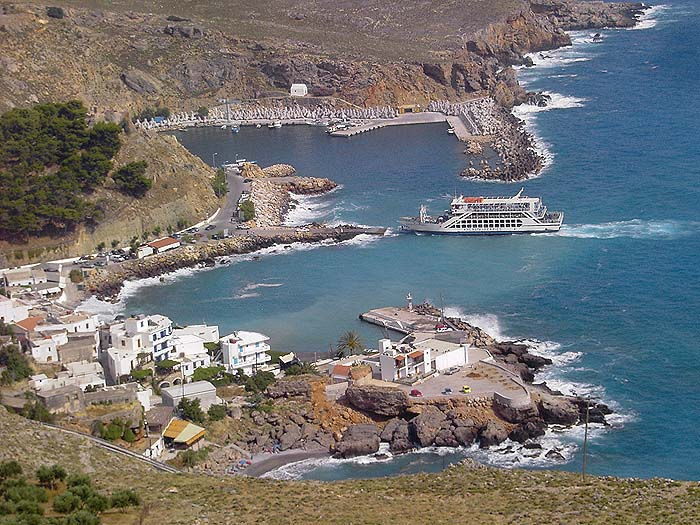
Modern day view of the Hóra Sfakíon cove

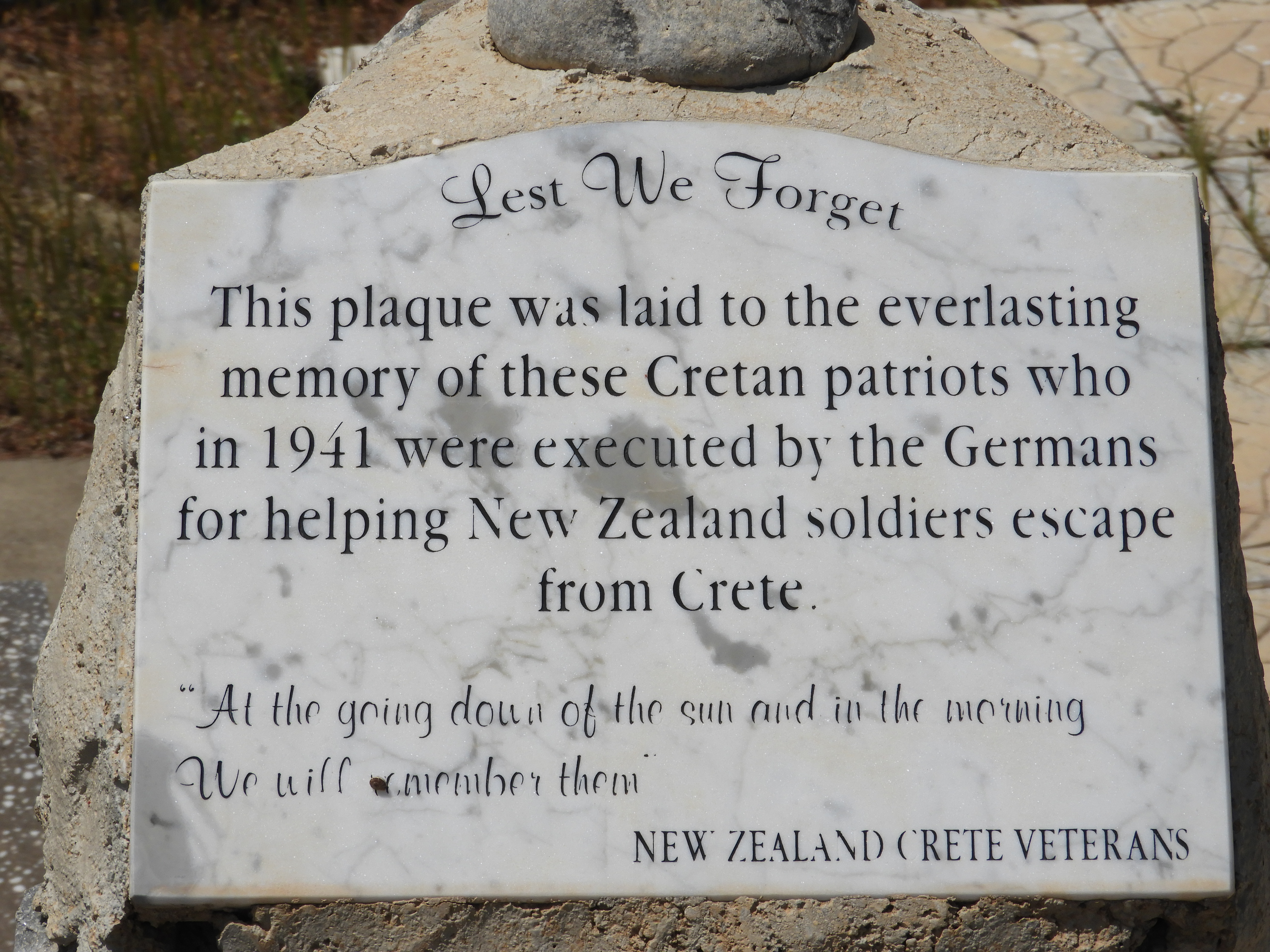
Commemorative plaque for Cretans executed by the Germans for helping New Zealanders escape from Crete
