= Kourtaliotiko Gorge =

Gorge in Crete, Greece

Coordinates: 35.203°N 24.469°E

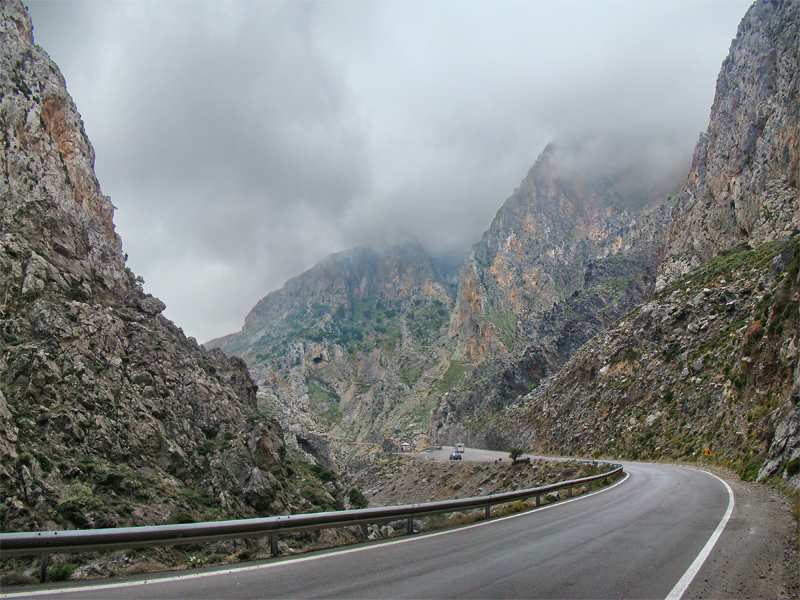
Kourtaliotiko Gorge

The Kourtaliotiko Gorge (Greek: Κουρταλιώτικο Φαράγγι), also known as the Asomatos Gorge (Greek: Φαράγγι Ασώματου), is a gorge on the southern side of the western part of the island of Crete. It is situated where the Kourtaliotiko River flows southwards between the mountains of Kouroupa and Xiron.

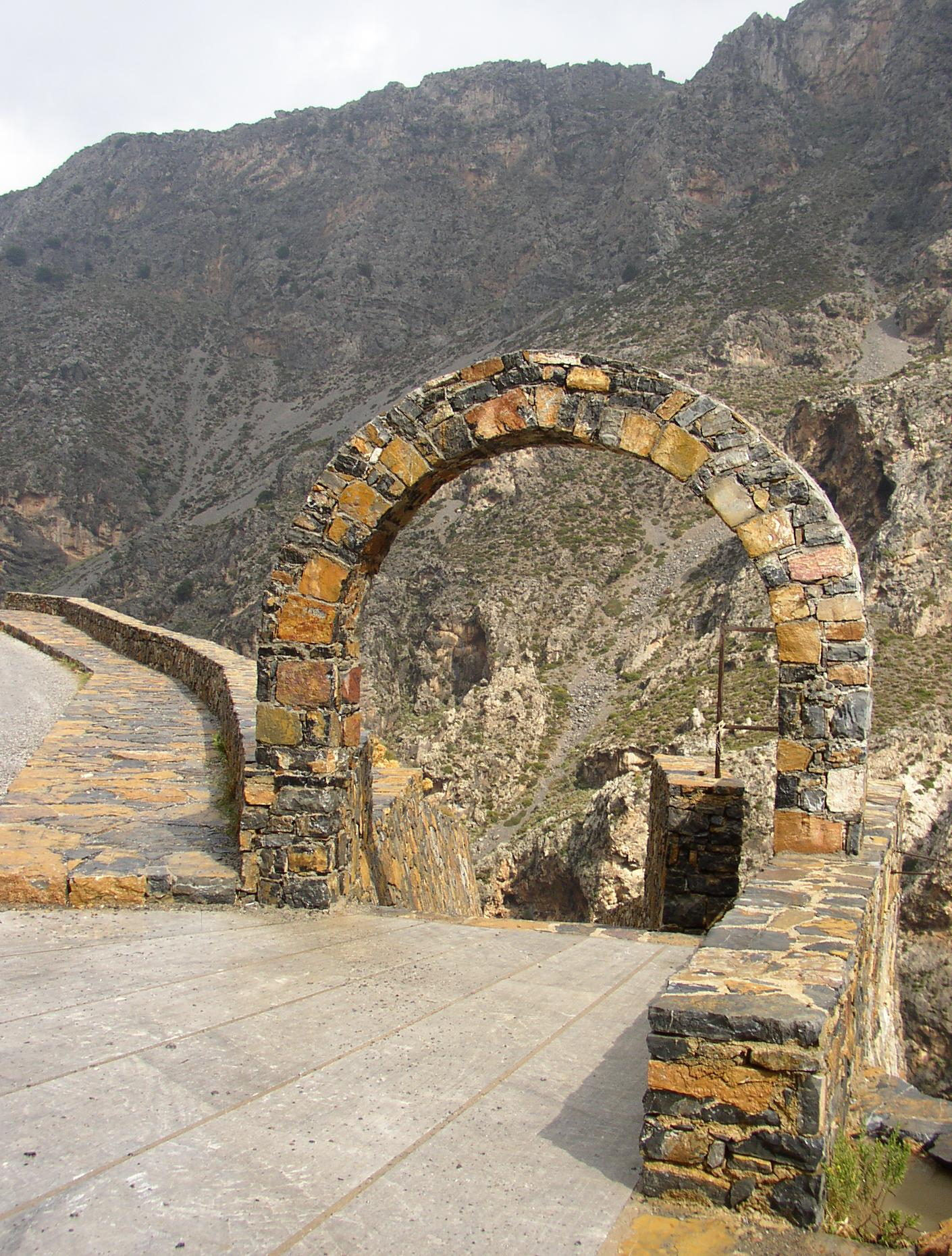
Entrance Arch

The village of Koxare is at the northern end of the gorge. A road runs north to south through the gorge connecting Koxare to Asomatos; it then leads west, to the town of Plakias on the southern coast of Crete.

There is a small church (Agios Nikolaos) in the gorge and a 40-metre-high waterfall.

The cliffs on the side of the gorge provide a roosting site for the Lammergeier vulture.

There is a specific point on the gorge, about 20 metres from the northern entrance, some "claps" can be heard, like hands coming together. These "claps" are the "kourtala", that give the name ο Κουρταλιώτης ( o Kourtaliotis, "the rattle" and "the noisy") to the gorge. These are a consequence of the wind being funnelled through the high caves of the gorge and breaking the sound barrier. The point near the northern entrance is the main point where this sound can be heard.

The gorge leads to a sandy beach Preveli, and is inhabited by native palm trees. An experienced hiker could follow the path across the river in order to reach the beach. It takes about 2 and a half hours at an average pace. However, there is an alternative path, one parallel to the river, which easier and faster to walk through.

== See also ==
- Kotsifos Gorge
