= Loutro, Chania =

Village in Chania regional unit, Crete, Greece

Coordinates: 35°12′N 24°5′E

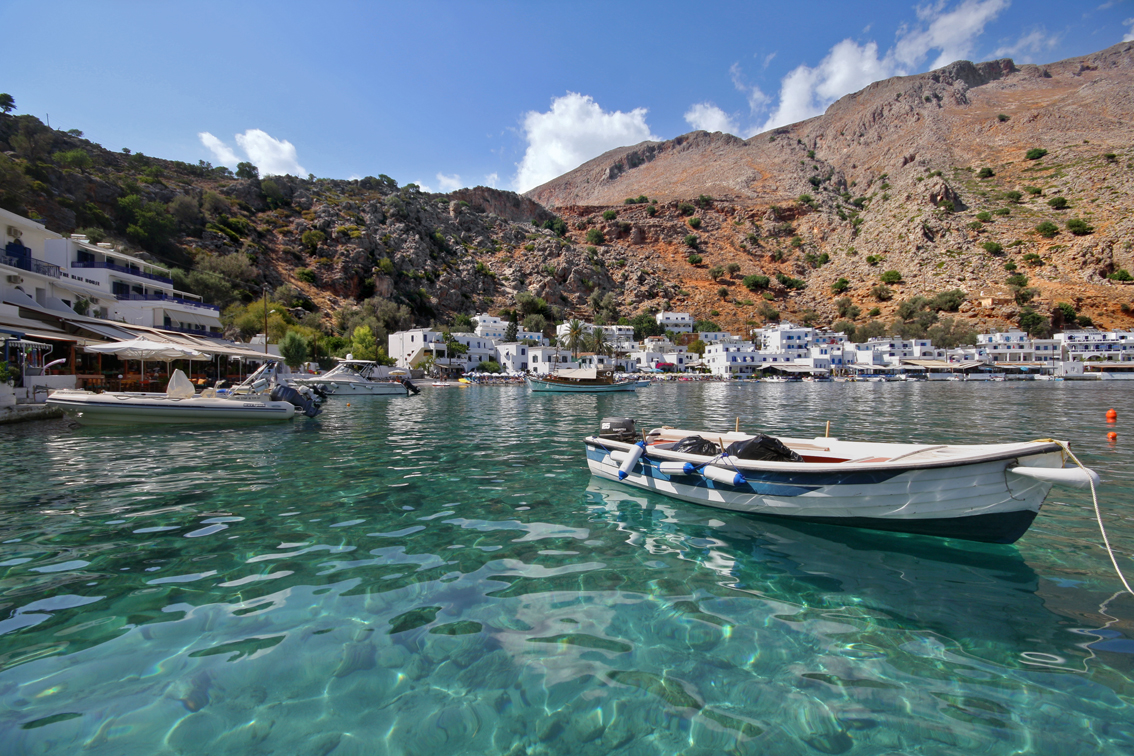
Loutro coast

Loutro (Greek: Λουτρό) (Greek: "Bath") lies in the municipality of Sfakia, on the south coast of Chania regional unit in west Crete, between Chora Sfakion and Agia Roumeli, the exit to the Samaria Gorge. The whole area is known as Sfakia. The village got its name from the Greek word for "bath," for the many ancient baths found in the area.

== History ==
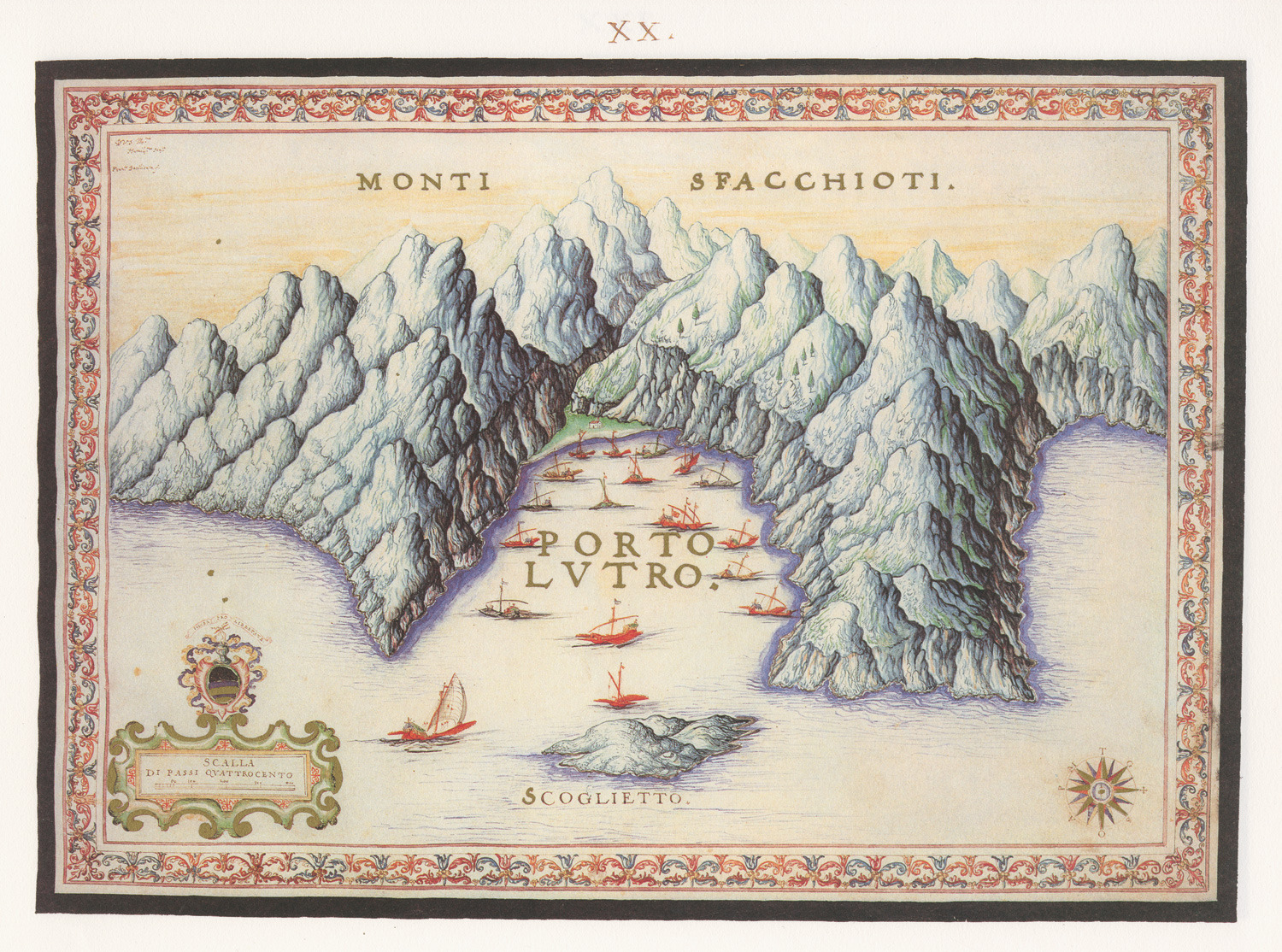
Map by Francesco Basilicata, 1618

Loutro is the site of the ancient city of Phoenix (Finikas), which was the port town of ancient Anopolis, and an important harbour in Hellenistic and Roman times. It later became the wintertime port of the town of Sfakia because of its natural protection during harsh weather. Today nothing remains of ancient Phoenix except the name preserved by the small village in the bay west of Loutro.

Later the Saracen pirates used Loutro as a lair from which to attack the ships sailing south of Crete. The Venetians managed to drive out the Saracens and fortified Loutro with a small fortress whose ruins are still visible today. Another fortress preserved in better condition in Loutro is evidence of the Turkish presence here.

== Access ==
Loutro is accessible only by foot or by sea. Ferries run daily connecting Loutro to nearby towns and the exit-point of the Samaria Gorge.

== Economy ==
Much of Loutro's economy is based on tourism and fishing.

== See also ==
- Sfakia
