= Drosoulites =

The term Drosoulites (Greek: Δροσουλίτες) refers to a long procession of visions, seen by residents around Frangokastello castle in Sfakia region of Crete (Greece). The phenomenon is rumored to be visible every year, on the anniversary of the Battle of Frangokastello or even in early June near a small village in southern Crete.

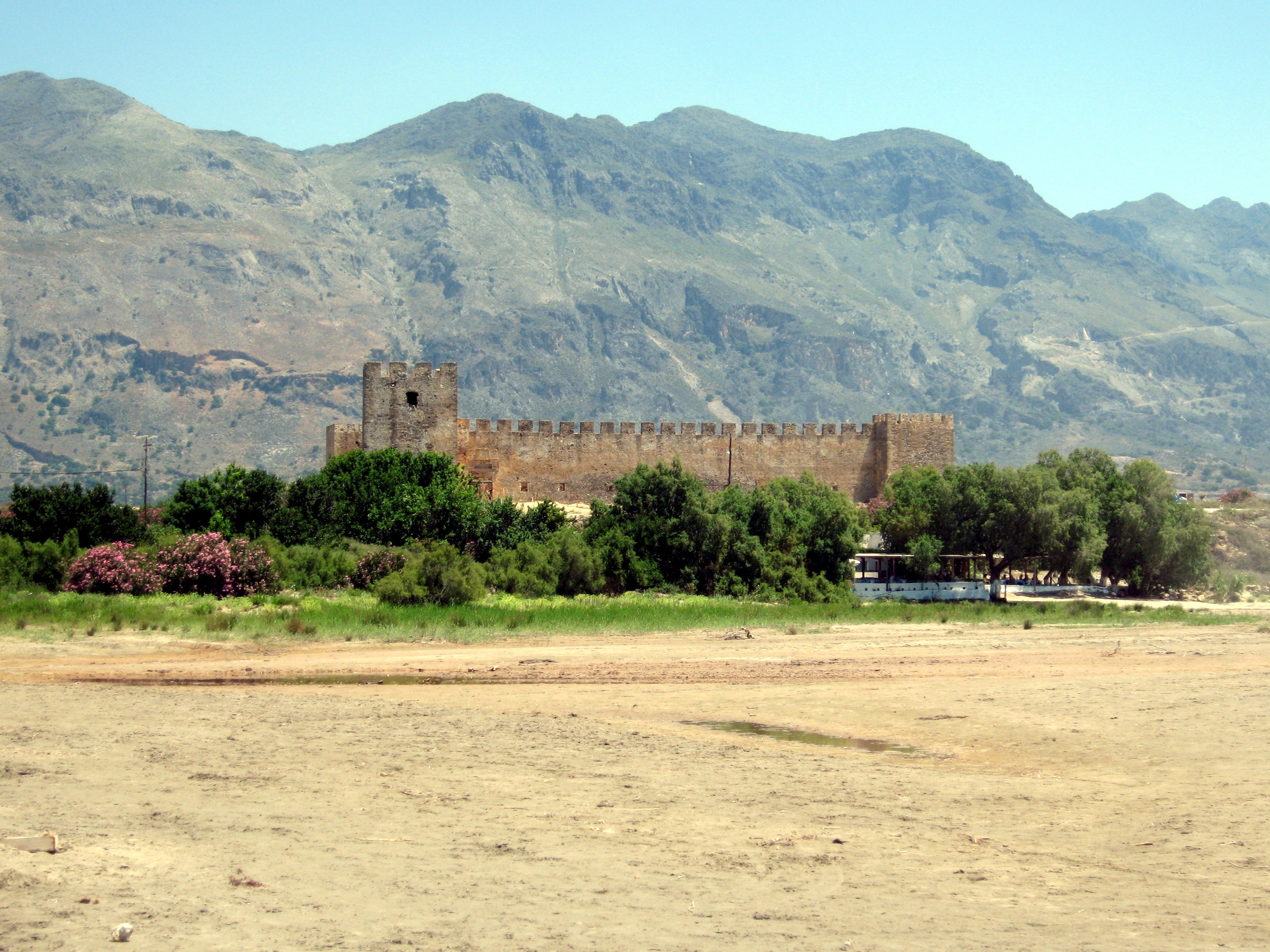
Frangokastello

The visions, as described by witnesses, consist of a group of human-like shadows dressed in black, walking or riding, armed with weapons, moving from the monastery of Agios Charalambos and advancing towards the old fort, Frangokastello, a 14th-century Venetian fortification. Legend has it that this group of people are Greek fighters that died during the Battle of Frangokastello (17 May 1828) and since then they appear as supernatural beings in the area.

The ghost army is led by Hatzimichalis Dalianis, from Delvinaki in Epirus, the chief of the Greek men, 350 of whom were lost, in the battle. The army took refuge in the fort during the Greek War of Independence against the Turks, where they were killed after a seven-day siege.

The local people named them Drosoulites ("dew shadows") due to the time of day that the phenomenon takes place. The phenomenon is observed when the sea is calm and the atmosphere is moist and before the sun rises too high in the sky. It usually lasts about 10 minutes.

The shadows are visible from the valley at a distance of 1000 m. Many have tried to explain the phenomenon scientifically, and at one time it was explained as a mirage from the coast of North Africa, but still there is no accepted consensus. On the other hand, another, occult, interpretation implies the existence of a psychic phenomenon, clairvoyance, seen in some countries like Britain and Germany, also regarding ghost armies. The appearance of the Drosoulites is documented over the ages. In 1890 a transient Turkish army took the images for rebels and fled away. Even during the Second World War, a German patrol is said to have opened fire on the visions.

== Sources ==
- Detorakis, Theocharis (1988). "Η Τουρκοκρατία στην Κρήτη ("Turkish rule in Crete")". In Panagiotakis, Nikolaos M. (in Greek). Crete, History and Civilization. II. Vikelaia Library, Association of Regional Associations of Regional Municipalities. pp. 333–436.
- Omnibus vol. 15-20. Joint Association of Classical Teachers. J.A.C.T., 1991, p. 10
- Athanassouli E., Pavlidou S., Theodossiou I.. W. Crete and Gavdos Island. Institute of Geology & Mineral Exploration. ISBN 978-960-98903-0-4, p. 6.
- Davaras, Costis, Guide to Cretan antiquities. Noyes Press, 1976. ISBN 978-0-8155-5044-0, p. p.103.
- Davaras, Costis, Führer zu den Altertümern Kretas, Athens 2003, p.78.
- Leadbeater, C.W., Clairvoyance, London 1899, pp.141-147; cf.www.anandgholap/on line library of theosophical books.
