= Samaria Gorge =

Gorge and national park in Crete, Greece

Coordinates: 35°16′16″N 23°57′41″E

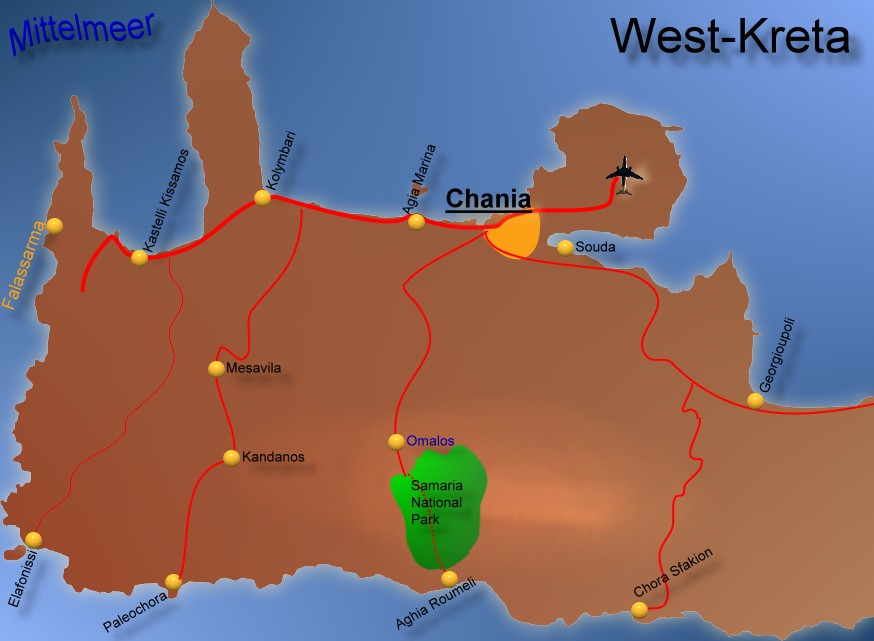
Samariá Gorge national park

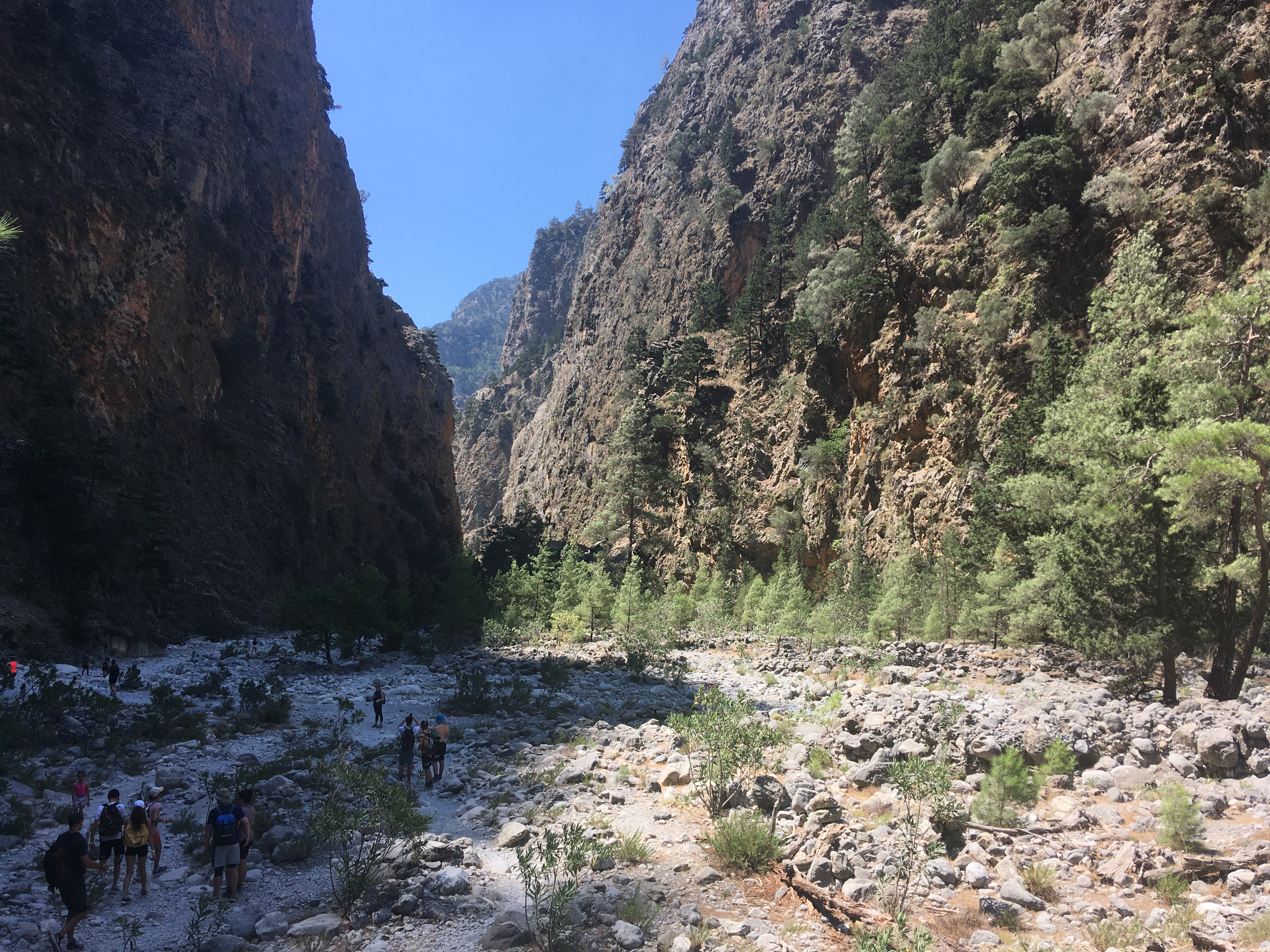
Walkers in the Samariá Gorge in 2022

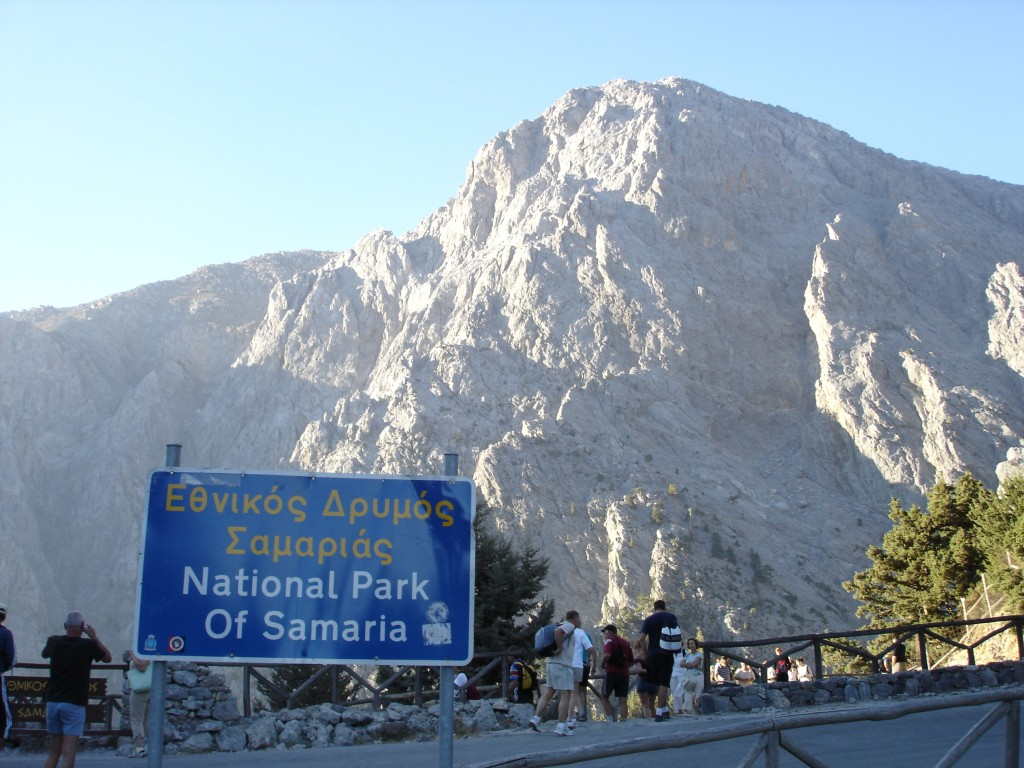
Entrance to the Gorge

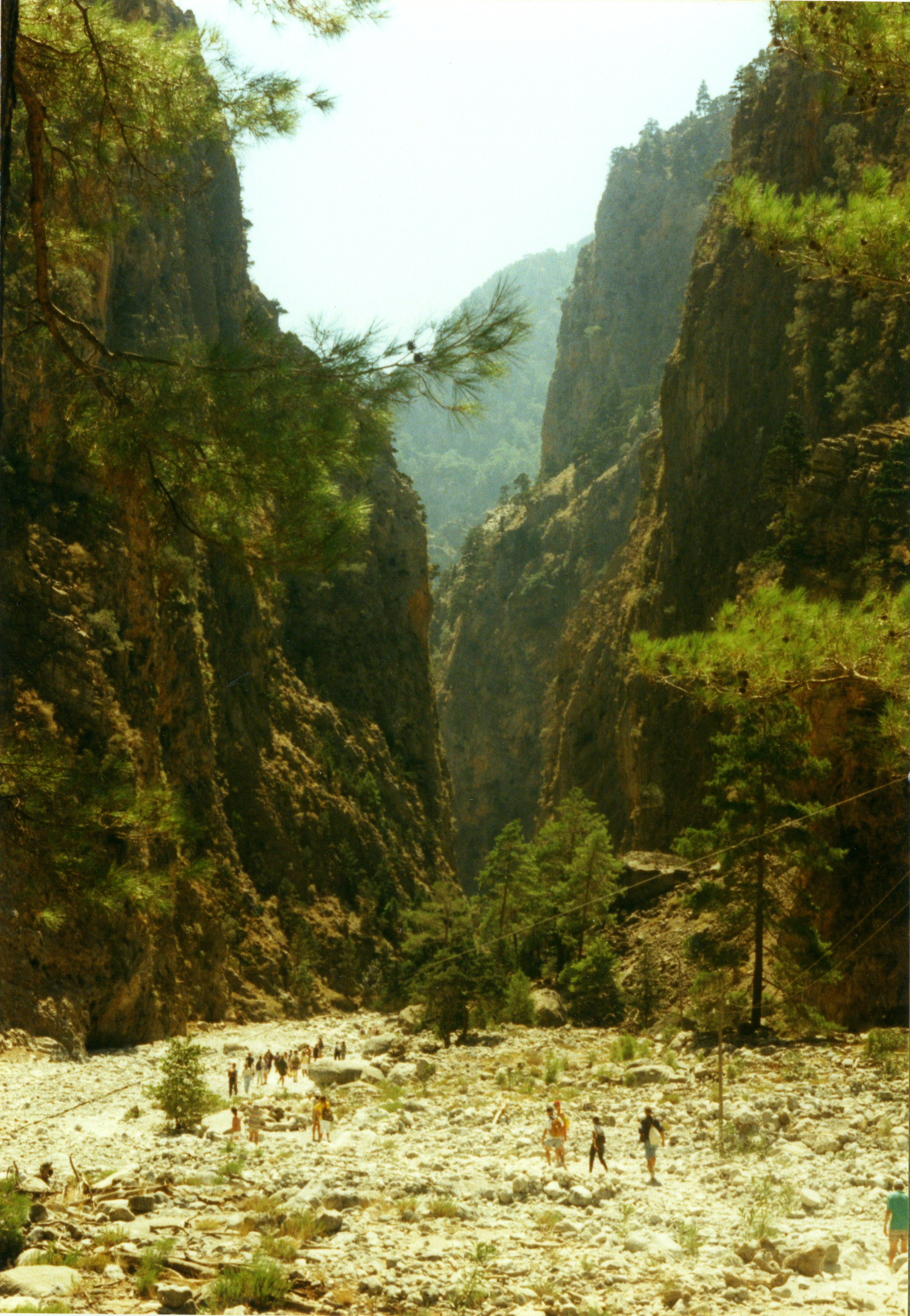
Upper entrance

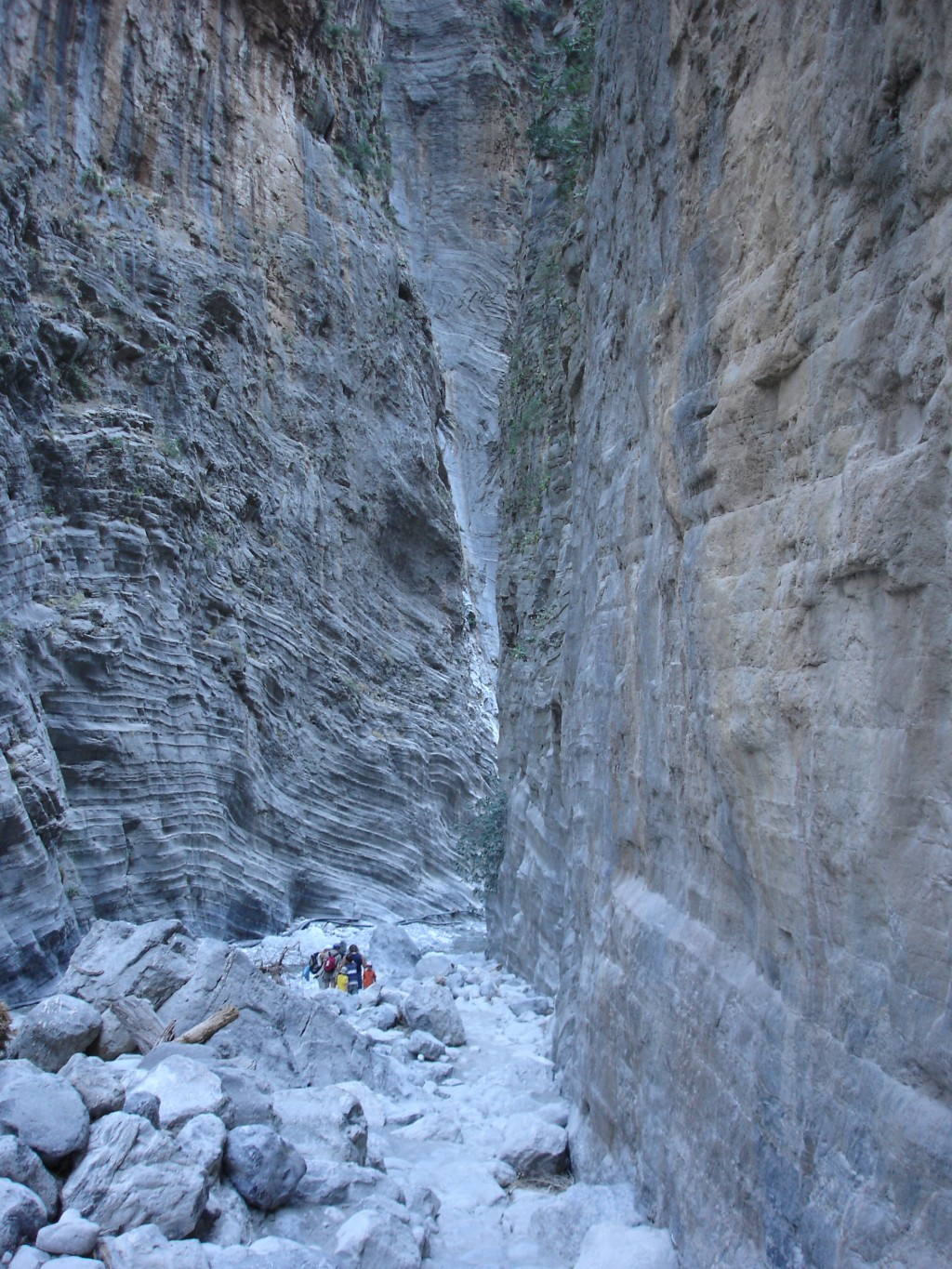
Samaria Gorge

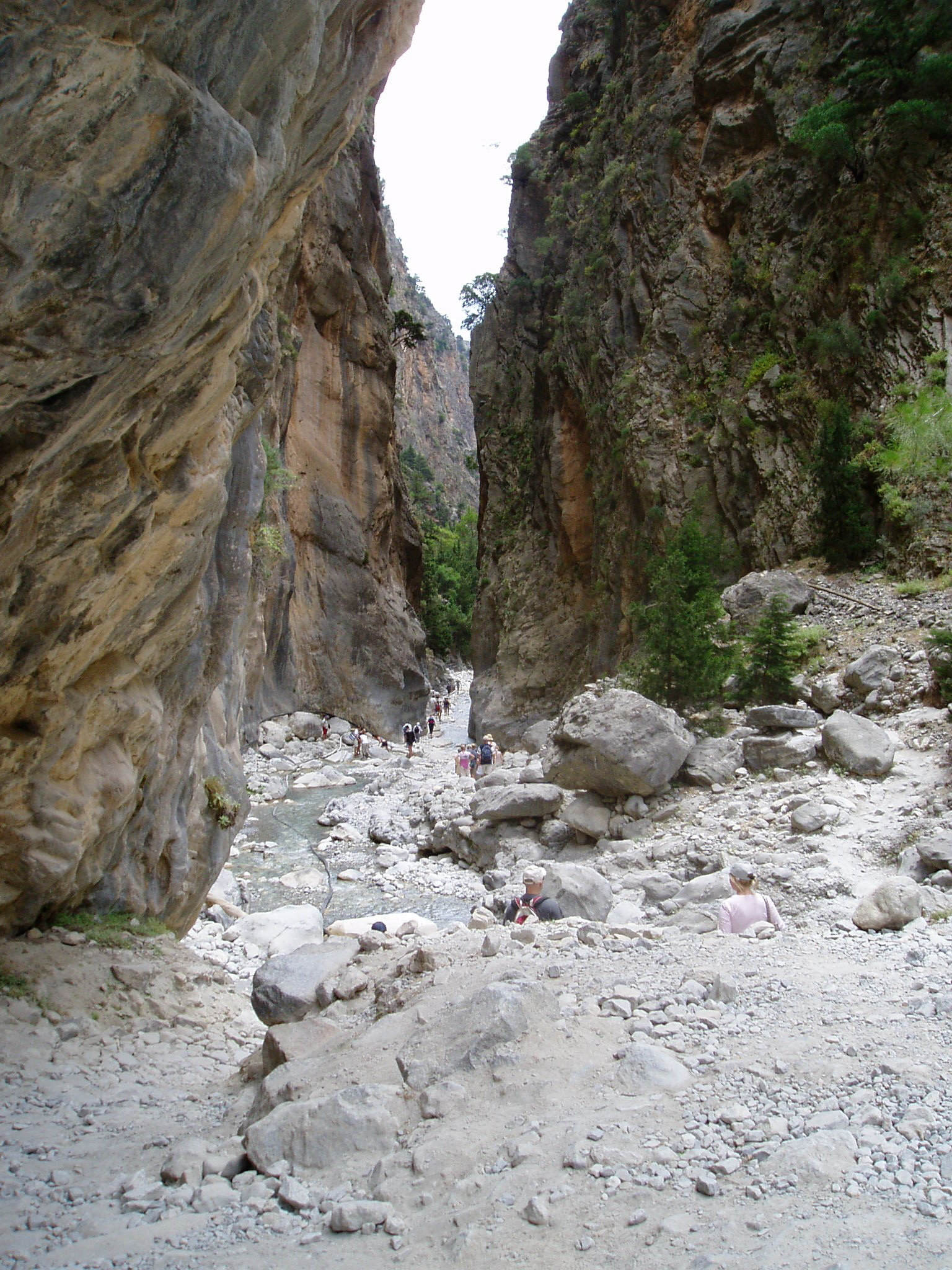
Portes – the narrowest part

The Samariá Gorge (Greek: Φαράγγι Σαμαριάς or just Φάραγγας) is a National Park of Greece since 1962 on the island of Crete – a major tourist attraction of the island – and a World's Biosphere Reserve.

The gorge is in southwest Crete in the regional unit of Chania. It was created by a small river running between the White Mountains (Lefká Óri) and Mt. Volakias. There are a number of other gorges in the White Mountains. While some say that the gorge is 18 km long, this distance refers to the distance between the settlement of Omalos on the northern side of the plateau and the village of Agia Roumeli. In fact, the gorge is 16 km long, starting at an altitude of 1,250 m at the northern entrance, and ending at the shores of the Libyan Sea in Agia Roumeli. The walk through Samaria National Park is 13 km long, but one has to walk another two kilometers to Agia Roumeli from the park exit, making the hike 15 km long. The most famous part of the gorge is the stretch known as the Gates (or, albeit incorrectly, as "Iron Gates"), where the sides of the gorge close in to a width of only four meters and soar up to a height of almost 300 meters (980 feet). The gorge became a national park in 1962, particularly as a refuge for the rare kri-kri (Cretan goat), which is largely restricted to the park and an island just off the shore of Agia Marina. There are several other endemic species in the gorge and surrounding area, as well as many other species of flowers and birds.

The village of Samariá lies just inside the gorge. It was finally abandoned by the last remaining inhabitants in 1962 to make way for the park. The village and the gorge take their names from the village's ancient church, Óssia María.

Visitors to Crete can complete the walk down the gorge from the Omalos plateau to Agia Roumeli on the Libyan Sea, at which point tourists sail to the nearby village of Sougia or Hora Sfakion, where they could spend a night there, or they could catch a coach back to Chania. The walk takes five to seven hours and can be strenuous, especially at the peak of summer.

Local tourist operators provide organized tours to the Gorge. These include bus transportation from one's hotel to the entrance (near Omalos village), and a bus connection that will be waiting for hikers after they disembark the ferry in Sougia or Sfakia (Chora Sfakion). If you are on your own, you can make a one-day round trip from Chania (see below) or from Sougia or Paleochora. Note that the morning buses from Sougia and Paleochora do not operate on Sunday. The ferries leave Agia Roumeli to Chora Sfakion (eastbound) and to Sougia/Paleochora (westbound) at 17:30.

There also exists a way from Agia Roumeli to the Gates and back.

== Information provided by the Chania Forest Protection Service ==
- Visits to the National park are allowed from May 1 to October 31.
- Park visiting hours are 07:00 to 15:00 daily. From 15:00 to sunset, visitors are allowed to walk a distance of only two kilometers within the park, either from Xyloskalo or from Agia Roumeli.
- Within the park it is strictly prohibited to camp, stay overnight, light fires, or swim in the streams of the gorge.

== Other gorges in Crete ==
- Agia Eirini Gorge
- Gorge of the Dead
- Ha Gorge
- Imbros Gorge
- Kotsifos Gorge
- Kourtaliotiko Gorge
- Richtis Gorge
- Sarakina Gorge
