= Sfakia =

Municipality in Crete, Greece

Sfakia Σφακιά
- Municipality
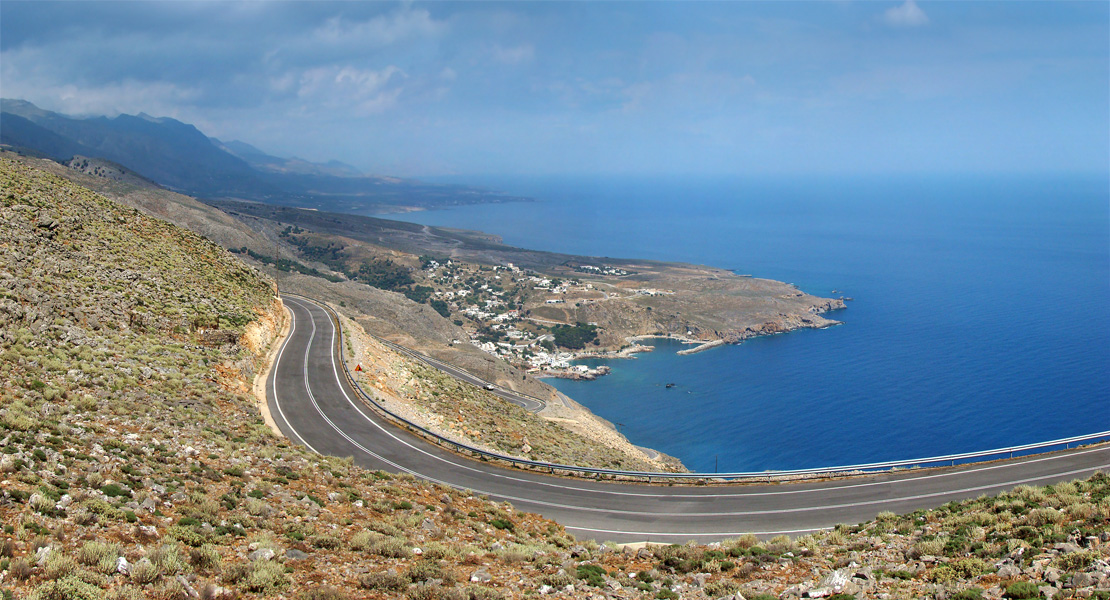
- Sfakia landscape around Hora Sfakion

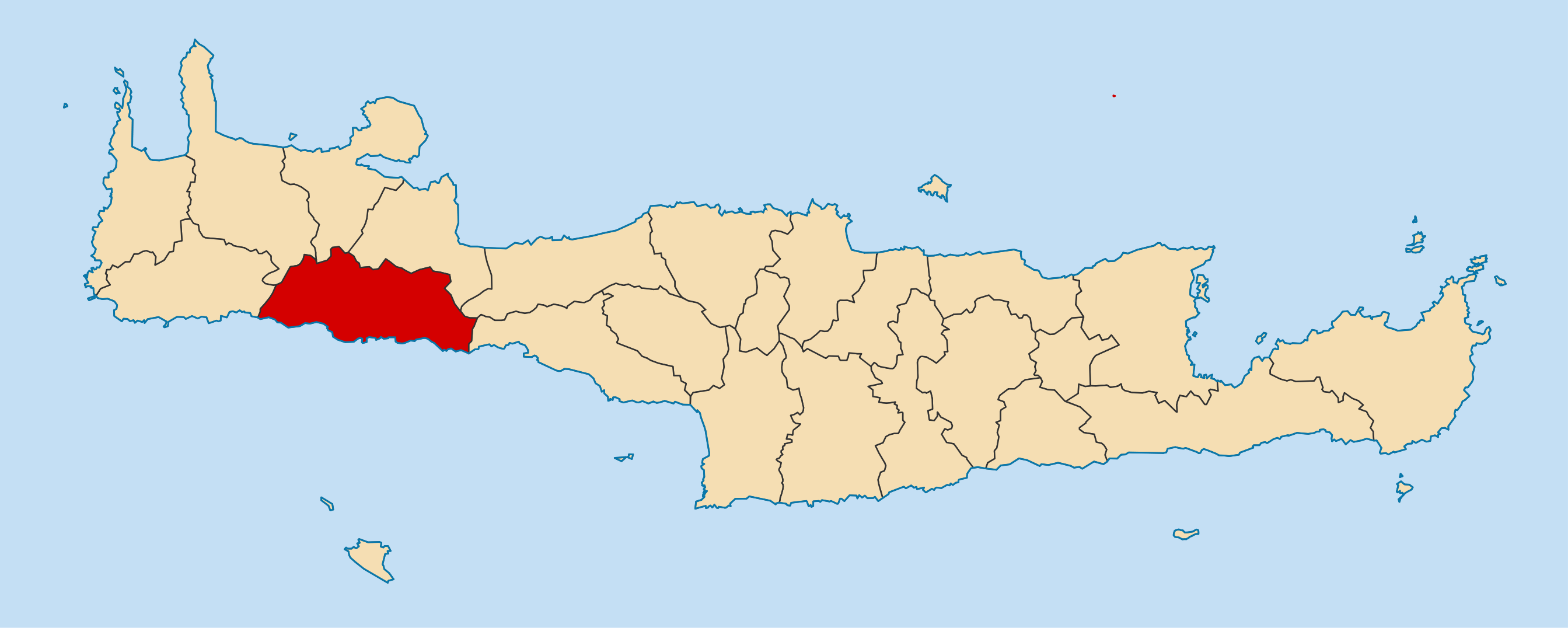

- Location within Greece
- Coordinates: 35°12′N 24°08′E
- Country: Greece
- Administrative region: Crete
- Regional unit: Chania
- Seat: Hora Sfakion

Government
  - Mayor: Ioannis Zervos (since 2023)

Area
  - Municipality: 467.6 km^{2} (180.5 sq mi)

Population (2021)
  - Municipality: 2,002
  - Density: 4.281/km^{2} (11.09/sq mi)
- Time zone: UTC+2 (EET)
  - Summer (DST): UTC+3 (EEST)
- Area code: 73011
- Vehicle registration: ΧΝ

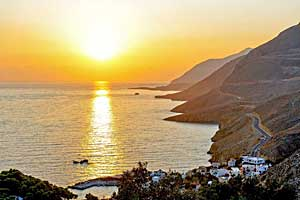
Sunset in Sfakia.

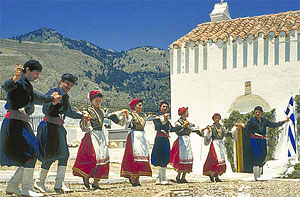
Traditional dancers at "Sfakian Liberation Festival".

Sfakiá (Greek: Σφακιά) is a mountainous area in the southwestern part of the island of Crete, in the Chania regional unit. It is considered to be one of the few places in Greece that have never been fully occupied by foreign powers. With a 2021 census population of 2,002 inhabitants living on a land area of 467.589 km^{2} (180.537 sq mi), Sfakia is one of the largest and least densely populated municipalities on the island of Crete. The etymology of its name is disputed. According to the prevailing theory, it relates to its rugged terrain, deriving from the ancient Greek word σφαξ, meaning land chasm or gorge.

== Description ==
The road from Chania to Sfakiá crosses the island from north to south, through the village of Vryses. From this village the route crosses the White Mountains (Lefká Óri) to Hóra Sfakíon (35°12′N 24°08′E) by the Libyan Sea. Halfway from Vrisses to Hóra Sfakíon is the fertile plateau of Askifou, surrounded by high mountain peaks. From here to Hóra Sfakíon the road is particularly spectacular. The road hugs the western slope of the Imbros Gorge offering scenic views. Another scenic route is that leading from Kapsodasos to the plateau of Kallikratis, northeast of Hóra Sfakíon.

There are many beaches in Sfakiá which do not see the numbers of tourists of the northern coast. More adventurous visitors can follow the European hiking footpath E4 which crosses Crete through Sfakiá's mountains. The coastal villages are not connected by a coastal road, but can be reached by ferry boats.

Not far east from Hóra Sfakíon is Frangokastello, literally "Frankish castle". The Venetian fortress here was built in 1371 to deter pirates and unsuccessfully, to control Sfakiá. It is largely ruined but is picturesquely set on a wide sandy beach with the towering White Mountains behind. Daskalogiannis was captured here in 1771.

Accessible only by boat from Sfakiá is Loutro, a small seaside village with some archaeological ruins, a few houses, small hotels and tavernas. Loutro is car-free; cars must be parked in Hóra Sfakíon or Paleohóra. In the north of Sfakiá is the fertile plain of Askyfou. The Sfakía region is crossed by many gorges, among which is the famous Samaria Gorge. All these gorges run from north to south and all end in the sea. Many of them can be walked, several even by inexperienced walkers. The region is inhabited by rare animals, like vultures and eagles, and the kri-kri (or agrimi), the wild Cretan goat. The coast of Sfakiá is on the Libyan Sea, which is inhabited by a diminishing fish population, but occasionally dolphins, and even whales may be seen. The idea of inaccessibility and ruggedness has played a key role in how Sfakia has been represented since at least the 18th century and it is reiterated in various ways today by tourists and locals.

The local speciality, "Sfakian Pies", are thin pancakes filled with mizithra cheese and served drizzled with honey.

== Resistance ==
Hóra Sfakíon is famous as one of the centers of the resistance against the occupying forces of both the Venetians and the Turks. The impenetrable White Mountains to the north combined with the rocky beaches on the south helped the locals fight off all invaders. Anopolis, a village near Hóra Sfakíon, is the birthplace of one of the most celebrated Cretan revolutionaries, Daskalogiannis.

A famous legend and unexplained phenomenon describes a procession of visions (Drosoulites) seen in the nearby village Frangokastello as troops that died in the war of independence against the Turks.

Patrick Leigh Fermor wrote about the tall proud Sfakians and their resistance to occupation. Many tales of revolts and uprisings in Crete start in the mountains of western Crete - mountain guerillas, pallikari fighters and rebel assemblies.

After the Battle of Crete during World War II, the locals helped many Australian and New Zealand soldiers escape from here on the night of May 31, 1941, suffering great reprisals. King George II of Greece had already escaped this way when the Germans invaded. Near the village of Komitades is the Church of Panagia Thymiani where the revolution of 1821 began. At the village of Loutro is the ruined "chancellery" where the first revolutionary government of 1821 met.

Sfakiá is notorious for the harshness of the environment and the warlike people. Sfakians themselves are still considered somewhat beyond the reach of the lawmakers and tax collectors of Athens, with vendettas over stolen sheep and women's honour still fought into the mid-20th century, with a whole village abandoned.

Stealing and banditry had been considered a way of life in the mountains, even appearing in a Creation myth, which made God Himself a Sfakiot, as recounted by Adam Hopkins:

...with an account of all the gifts God had given to other parts of Crete - olives to Ierapetra, Ayios Vasilios and Selinou; wine to Malevisi and Kissamou; cherries to Mylapotamos and Amari. But when God got to Sfakia only rocks were left. So the Sfakiots appeared before Him armed to the teeth. "And us Lord, how are we going to live on these rocks?" and the Almighty, looking at them with sympathy, replied in their own dialect (naturally): "Haven't you got a scrap of brains in your head? Don't you see that the lowlanders are cultivating all these riches for you?"

The Sfakians are also famous for their hospitality and generosity towards guests, resulting in a shift from traditional labour towards tourism, with now many families running their own small hotel or restaurant. Many northern European visitors to the area in the 1970s onward who still return today stress hospitality as key element that attracted them to Sfakia. Conversing with these visitors' impressions, locals are very interested in the idea of hospitality as a form of cultural distinctiveness and morality and they often debate what it means to speak of hospitality in the age of mass tourism.

== History ==
The archeology and history of Sfakia is the object of a field survey undertaken by the University of Oxford.

== Province ==
The province of Sfakia (Greek: Επαρχία Σφακίων) was one of the provinces of the Chania Prefecture. It had the same territory as the present municipality. It was abolished in 2006.

== See also ==
- Sfakians
