= History of Zakynthos =

History of the Greek island

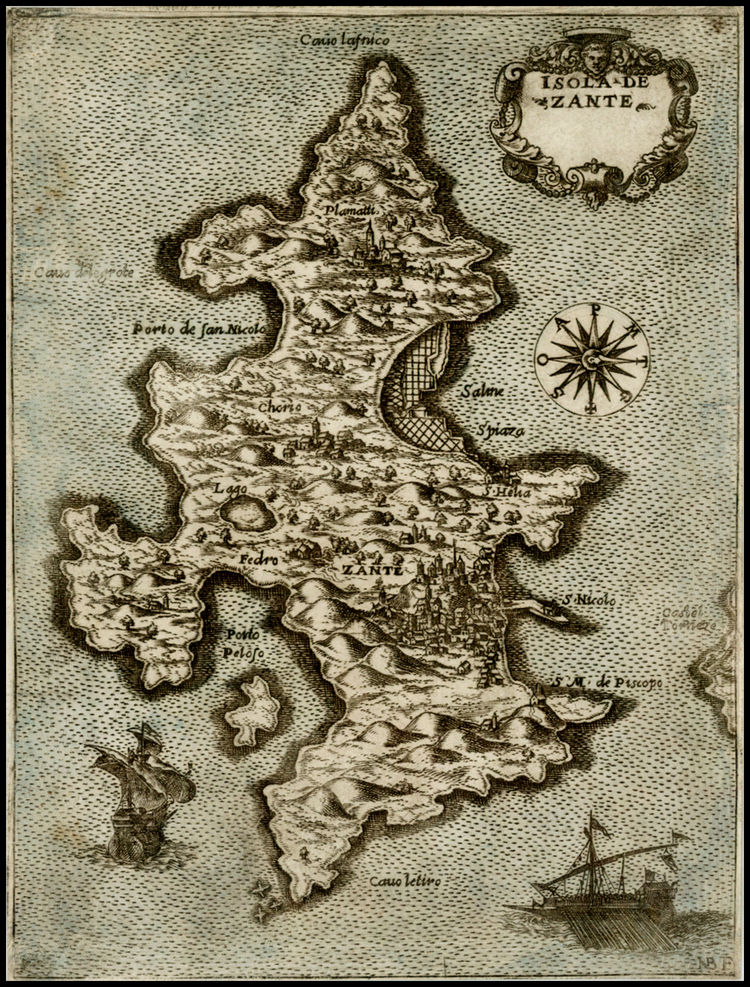
Early Venetian map of the Island of Zante, engraved by Natale Bonifacio, 1574

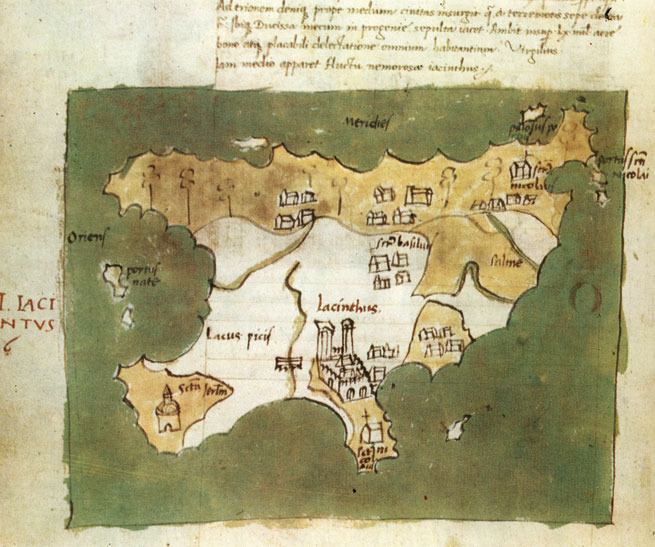
Map of the island by Cristoforo Buondelmonti (1420)

Zakynthos (Greek: Ζάκυνθος, Zante in Italian) is a Greek island in the Ionian Sea. It is the third largest of the Ionian Islands. Today, Zakynthos is a separate regional unit of the Ionian Islands region, and its only municipality. It covers an area of 405.55 km^{2} (156.6 sq mi) and its coastline is roughly 123 km (76 mi) in length. The name, like all similar names ending in -nthos, is pre-Mycenaean or Pelasgian in origin. In Greek mythology the island was said to be named after Zakynthos, the son of a legendary Arcadian chief Dardanus.

After the fall of the Byzantine Empire, Zakynthos has been held by the Kingdom of Naples, the Ottoman Turks, the Republic of Venice, the French, Russians, British, Italians and Germans.

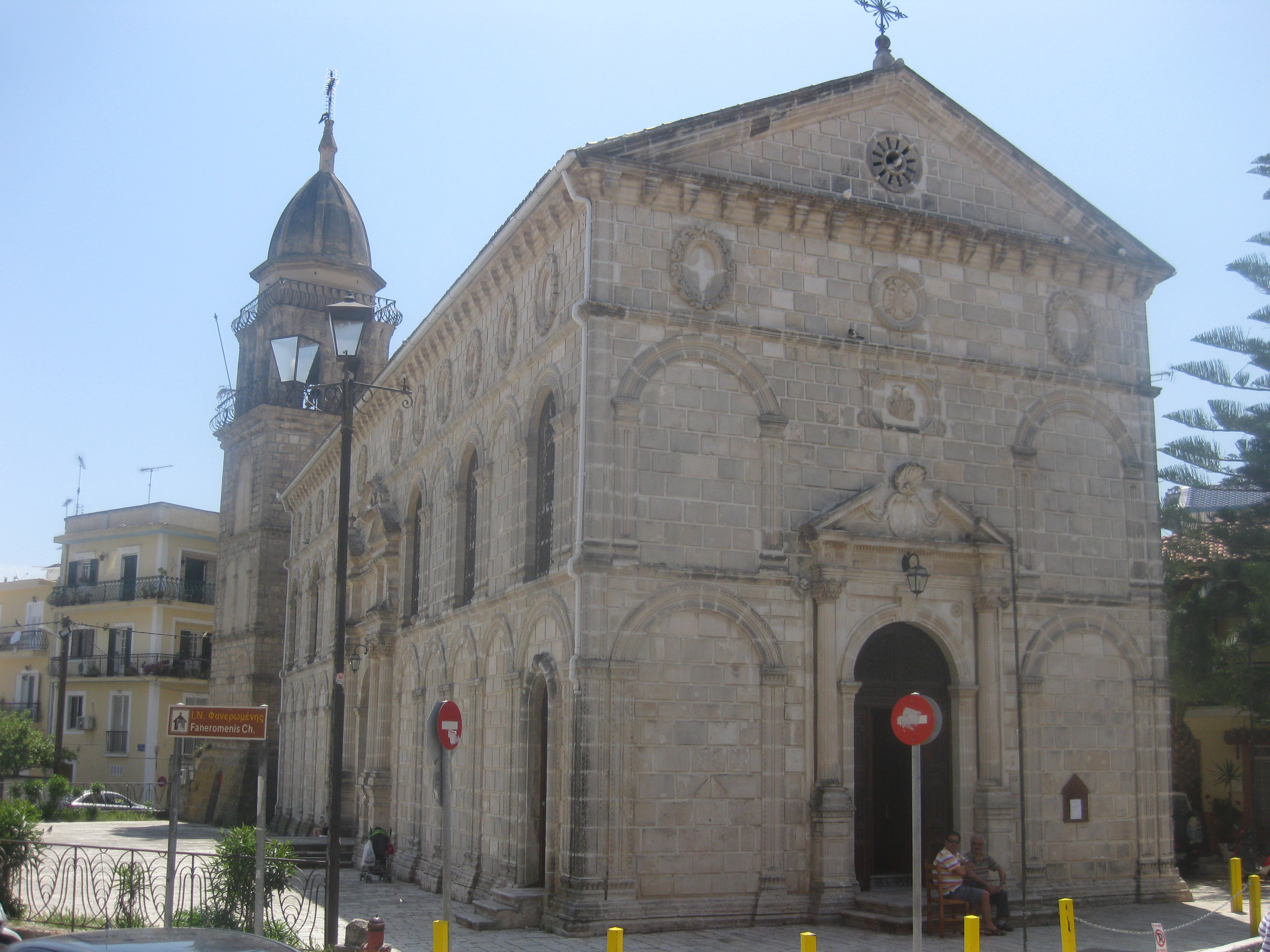
Faneromeni church, Zakynthos town

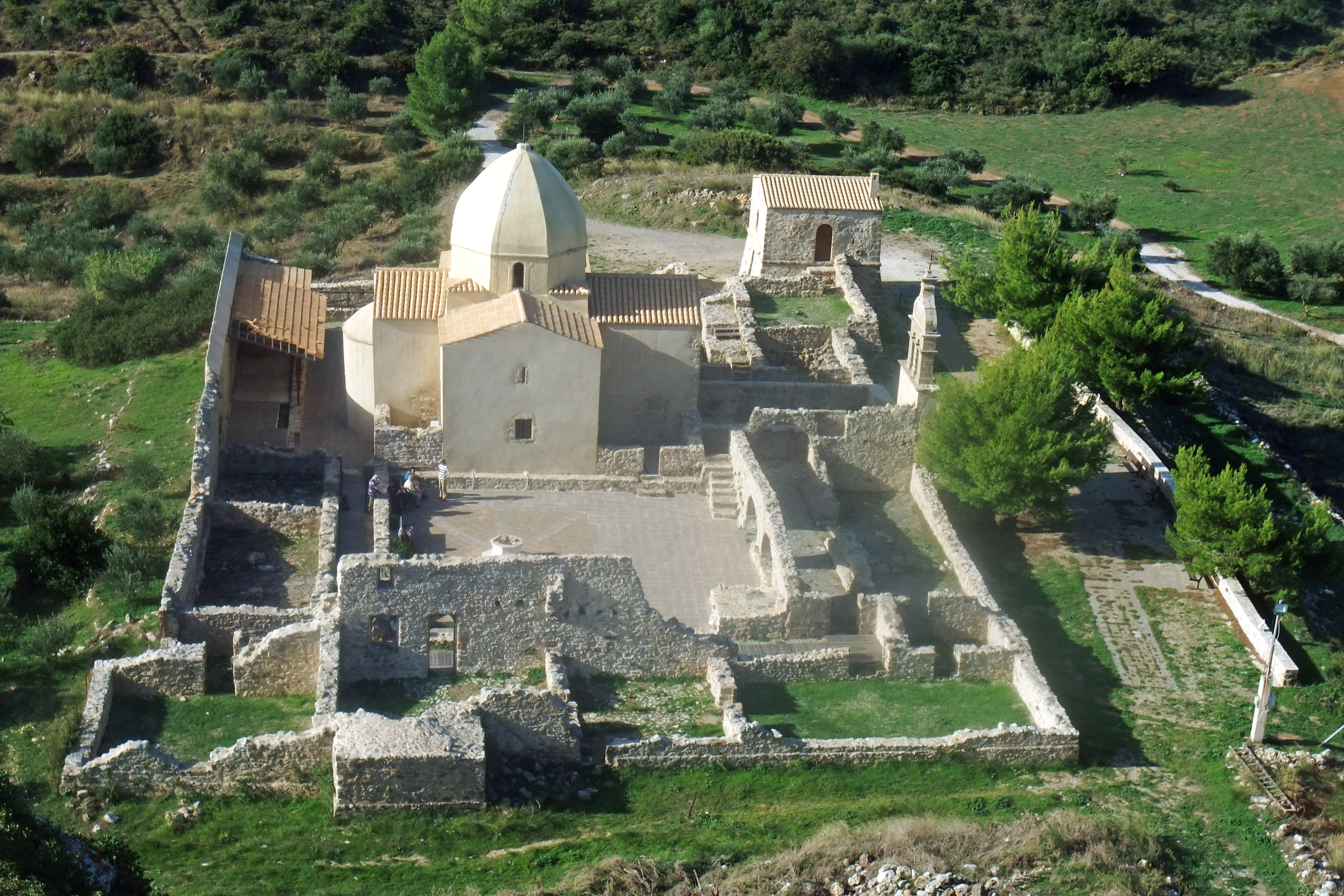
Church and monastery ruins of Panagía Skopiótissa on Mount Skopós

== Ancient history ==
Zakynthos has been inhabited from at least the Paelolithic Age. The island was important during the Mycenaean period, being mentioned three times on Linear B tablets from Pylos, Messenia. There were also Zakynthian rowers present in the Mycenaean Messenian state. The Mycenaean presence is further attested by the monumental Mycenaean built and tholos tombs that have been excavated on Zakynthos. Most important is the Mycenaean cemetery that was accidentally discovered during road construction in 1971 near the town of Kambi.

The ancient Greek poet Homer mentioned Zakynthos in the Iliad and the Odyssey, stating that its first inhabitants were the son of King Dardanos of Arcadia called Zakynthos and his men. Before being renamed Zakynthos, the island was said to have been called Hyrie. Zakynthos was then conquered by King Arkesios of Cephalonia, and then by Odysseus from Ithaca. Zakynthos participated in the Trojan War and is listed in the Homeric Catalogue of Ships which, if accurate, describes the geopolitical situation in early Greece at some time between the Late Bronze Age and the eighth century BC. In the Odyssey, Homer mentions 20 nobles from Zakynthos among a total of 108 of Penelope's suitors. The Athenian military commander Tolmides concluded an alliance with Zakynthos during the First Peloponnesian War sometime between 459 and 446 BC. In 430 BC, the Spartans made an unsuccessful attack upon Zakynthos. The Zakynthians were then enumerated among the autonomous allies of Athens in the disastrous Sicilian expedition. After the Peloponnesian War, Zakynthos seems to have passed under the supremacy of Sparta because in 374 BC, Timotheus, the Athenian commander, on his return from Corfu, landed some Zakynthian exiles on the island and assisted them in establishing a fortified post. These exiles must have belonged to the anti-Spartan party as the Zakynthian rulers applied for help to the Spartans who sent a fleet of 25 ships to the island;.

Philip V of Macedon seized Zakynthos in the early 3rd century BC when it was a member of the Aetolian League. In 211 BC, the Roman praetor Marcus Valerius Laevinus took the city of Zakynthos with the exception of the citadel. It was afterwards restored to Philip V of Macedon. The Roman general, Marcus Fulvius Nobilior, finally conquered Zakynthos in 191 BC for Rome. In the Mithridatic War, it was attacked by Archelaus, the general of Mithridates VI of Pontus, but he was repulsed.

== Byzantine period (330–1185) ==
The introduction of Christianity on Zakynthos is said to have occurred when either Saint Mary Magdalene or Saint Berenice visited the island in the 1st century AD on their way to Rome. In 324 AD, Zakynthos was made part of the Praetorian prefecture of Illyricum. As the Roman Empire split into Eastern and Western halves and the western half declined, Zakynthos and the rest of the Ionian Islands, now located on the periphery of the Eastern Roman or Byzantine Empire, became vulnerable to attacks from barbarian tribes and pirates. In 466, the Vandal King Genseric pillaged Zakynthos and captured 500 Zakynthian members of the local elite. Later the island was used as a naval station during Belisarius' campaign against the Vandals.

The Ionian Islands including Zakynthos remained largely unaffected by the Slavic invasions and settlement of the Greek mainland of the 7th century AD; however, they did suffer raids from Arab pirates in 880 and the Pisans in 1099. During the beginning of the Middle Byzantine era, Zakynthos formed a base for the re-establishment of imperial control and the re-Hellenization of the mainland coast with Greek-speaking settlers from southern Italy and Sicily. From the 9th century, Zakynthos was part of the Theme of Cephallenia, a military-civilian province comprising the Ionian Islands.

Following the collapse of Byzantine control in southern Italy in the mid-11th century, the Theme of Cephallenia's importance declined and was subsequently headed by civilian governors. Zakynthos endured attached from the Norman forces of Robert Guiscard in 1084 and Roger II of Sicily in 1147. Corfu and the rest of the Theme except for Lefkada were finally captured by the Normans under William II of Sicily in 1185. Although Corfu was recovered by the Byzantines by 1191, the other islands including Zakynthos remained lost to Byzantium, and formed a County palatine of Cephalonia and Zakynthos under William II's Greek admiral Margaritus of Brindisi.

== Latin rule (1185–1479) ==
After 1185 Zakynthos became part of the County palatine under the Kingdom of Naples until its last Count Leonardo III Tocco fled from the Ottomans in 1479. The title to rule Cephalonia and Zakynthos was originally given to the Greek Margaritos of Brindisi in 1185 for his services to William II. The County then passed on to a branch of the Orsini family until 1325, when it passed briefly to the Angevins of Naples and then from 1357 to the Tocco family. Carlo I Tocco used the county as a springboard for his acquisition of Greek mainland territory. However, facing the advance of the Ottomans, the Tocco successively lost their mainland territories and were once again reduced to the County palatine of Cephalonia and Zakynthos which they held until 1479, when the Ottomans raided the island and Leonardo III Tocco fled.

Coat of arms of the Tocco family as counts palatine

=== First refugees (1460–1479) ===
By 1460, and during the reign of Mehmed II, the Ottomans eventually controlled most of the Peloponnese with the exception of the remaining Venetian-controlled towns of Argos, Nafplio, Monemvassia, Methoni and Koroni. After the collapse of the Hexamilion, which was supposed to act as a defense across the Isthmus of Corinth; and hence, protect the Peloponnese, Leonardo III Tocco made an agreement with Venice to accept 10,000 refugees from this region. Leonardo III Tocco and his realm was increasingly vulnerable from Ottoman Turkish attacks. These refugees consisted of Greeks, Arvanites and some Venetian officials. Some of them were Stradiotes (see below) which Leonardo III Tocco must have figured would act as a bulwark against the Ottomans. Likely, many Stradiotes returned to the Peloponnese later, perhaps leaving their families in Zakynthos.

In April 1463, the Ottomans conquered Argos. The Venetians and their allies attempted a further defence of the Peloponnese but by 1464 more of the peninsula was under Ottoman Turkish control. Consequently, more refugees from the Peloponnese made their way to Zakynthos under the initiative of stradioti leader, Michael Rallis. Again, another wave made its way to Zakynythos in 1470 when the Ottoman Turks made further headway in the Peloponnese. Another group of stradiotes under the leadership of Nikolaos Bochalis and Petros Buas were stationed on the island during the last years of the First Venetian-Turkish War of 1463–1479. And so began the cycle of emigration of primarily Greeks from the Peloponnese, Crete, Rhodes and Cyprus to Zakynthos.

In total, a little over 10,000 Arvanitic-speaking Greeks who had retained Venetian citizenship, and some Venetian officials, are said to have emigrated from the west of the Peloponnese to Zakynthos during the period 1460–1479. The newcomers were given land grants to cultivate previously non-arable land and formed an almost independent community represented by a Venetian official called the Consul. The first consul was Martin di Trino. The presence of this community would play a critical role in the defence of Zakynthos in 1479 and its later occupation by the Venetian Republic.

=== Ottoman Turkish raid (1479) ===
During the reign of the Ottoman Turkish sultan Mehmet II, the Tocco family had been obliged to pay a tribute to the Sublime Porte to preserve their sovereignty. They were required to pay an annual tribute of 4000 ducats to the Sultan and to pay 500 ducats every time that an Ottoman Turkish sancak beyi or provincial governor visited Arta. Leonardo III Tocco was also bound by the treaty.

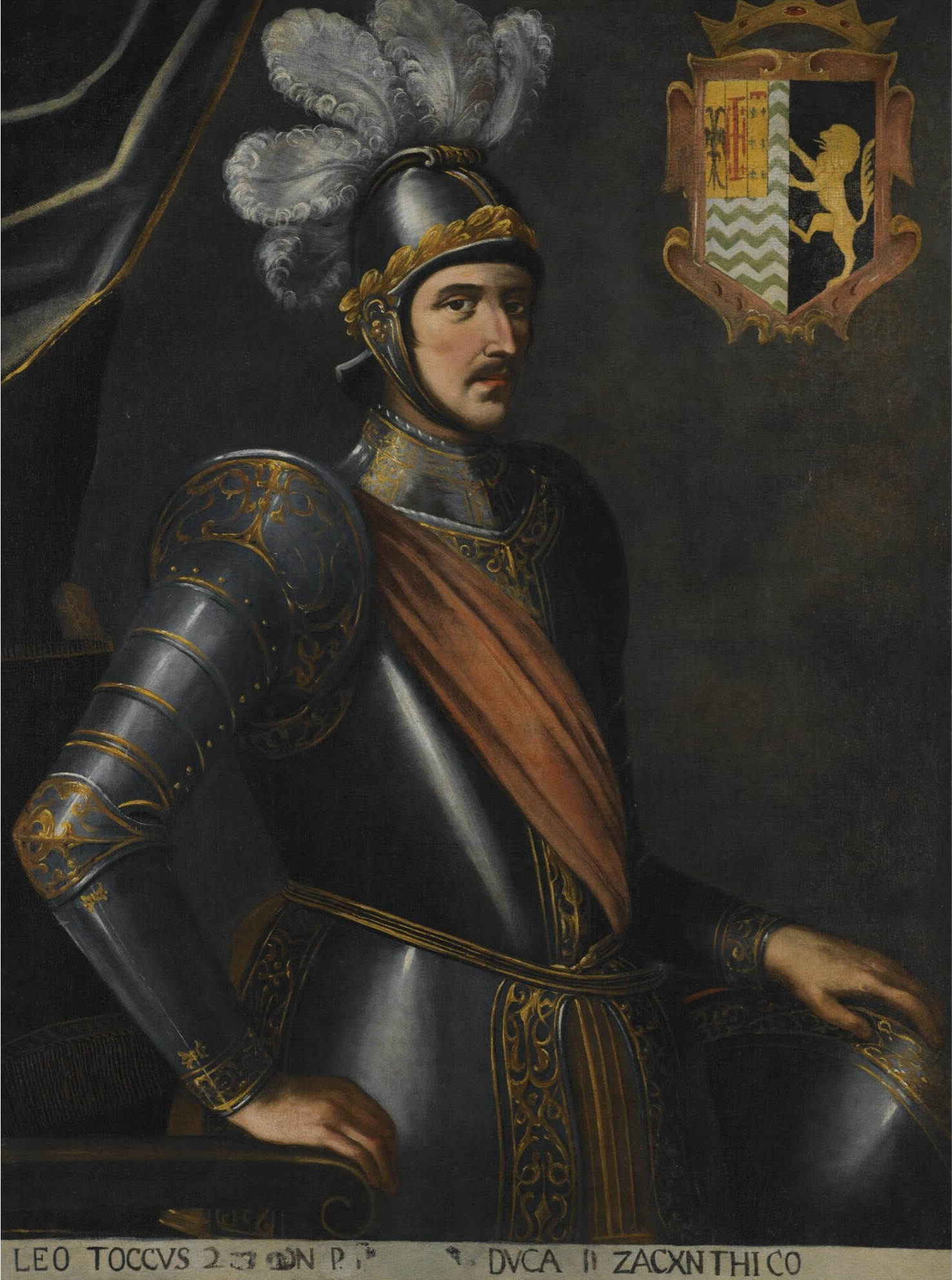
Leonardo de Tocco, Duke of Zakynthos by Carlo Sellito, c. 1510s. It is uncertain which Leonardo Tocco he represented in this painting.

Around this time, Zakynthos had some 25,000 inhabitants bringing Leonardo III Tocco's state more than 12,000 ducats a year, according to the Spanish historian G. Curita.

Conditions for the local Greek Orthodox population were also improving – it is said that Leonardo III Tocco was more friendly to the Orthodox Church than his predecessors. He was also sufficiently Hellenised to use Greek in his documents. Even though he made these concessions, evidence suggests he was regarded as a tyrant by the islanders. The Ionian Islands under Leonardo III Tocco's reign had also been the refuge of thousands escaping mainland Greece. Most prominently a few agreements negotiated between Venice and the County palatinate of Cephallonia and Zakynthos since the early 1460s – borne by Leonardo III Tocco's increasing military vulnerability in the face of the Ottoman Turkish threat. It also appeared that Zakynthos was by now acting as a staging point for Stradiotes in the service of Venice for their wars on the Italian and Greek mainland.

In early 1479, the new sancak beyi of Ioannina passed through Arta. This official was not only 16 years of age, and he had been recently demoted by the Sultan but he was also related to Leanardo III Tocco – likely his cousin by being the bastard son of Leanardo's uncle, Carlo I who had gone over to the Ottoman Turks. In response to this insult, instead of handing over 500 ducats, Leonardo III Tocco presented a basket of cherries to him. Furious, the Bey reported the incident to the Porte in Constantinople.

Based on old grudges and for a chance to conquer some of the last Christian states in Greece, and perhaps to create a staging platform for an invasion of Italy, the complaint was taken as a pretext for war by the Sultan against Leonardo III Tocco. The Bey also reported to the Porte that during the recent First Venetian-Ottoman Turkish war (1463–1479), Leonardo III Tocco had provided stradiotes under the pay of Venice refuge on Zakynthos which helped them to continue their raids on the adjacent Ottoman-occupied Peloponesian territory.

Therefore, in mid-1479, the Sultan ordered the Bey of Valona, celebrated captain and former Grand Vizier, Gedik Ahmed Pasha, to attack Leonardo III Tocco with 29 ships. In early 1479, Gedik Ahmed Pasha had concluded the siege of Scutari resulting in the cessation of that territory to the Ottoman Empire. Leonardo III Tocco did not wait the for Turkish invasion. He knew that the Venetians were unwilling, and the Neapolitans were incapable, to provide military assistance, and that his own subjects considered him tyrannical. Consequently, long before the Gedik Ahmed Pasha appeared, he collected all his portable valuables and fled from Lefkada to his castle in Cephalonia, Fort St George. However, he did not trust the garrison stationed there. Also, the approaching Ottomans noticed his ship was laden with treasure, so he hastily embarked along with his wife, his son, and two brothers on board another Venetian vessel to Taranto. Thereafter, he proceeded to Naples.

In the meantime, Gedik Ahmed Pasha was being watched by the Venetian admiral, Antonio Loredan as he sailed down the strait between Corfu and the Greek mainland. But the Venetian admiral did not dare to disturb Gedik Ahmed Pasha in fear of stoking the continuation of the recently concluded First Venetian-Ottoman Turkish war. The Bey of Valona easily captured Vonitza, the last vestige of the old Despotate of Epiros and the islands of Lefkada, Cephalonia, and Ithaca from mid to late August 1479. He slaughtered the officials who worked for Leonardo III Tocco, burned the Fort of St George of Cephalonia and carried off many islanders to Constantinople to be sold into slavery. The destruction was so severe that Ithaca remained uninhabited until the beginning of the next century.

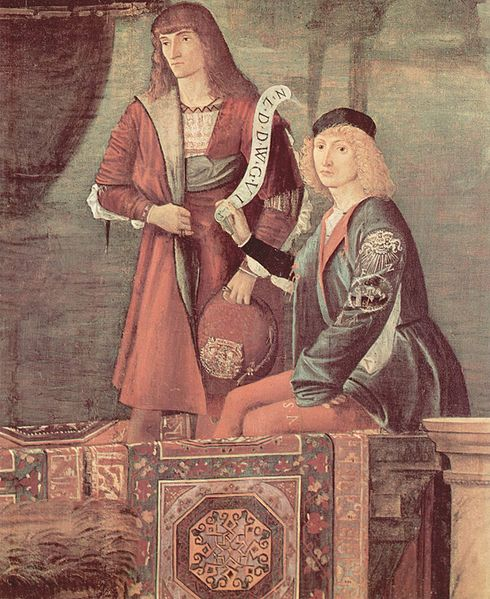
Detail from Meeting of the Betrothed Couple and the Departure of the Pilgrims by Vittore Carpaccio, 1495. Andrea Loredan is seated on the right.

Pasha then proceeded to attack Zakynthos. However, this time he was met by Antonion Loredan. The admiral protested that the island was inhabited by Venetian subjects from the Peloponnese and the Ottoman forces should cease their advances on the island. They then astutely hoisted, undoubtedly with the support of the local autochthonous population, the lion-banner of St Mark on the Castle.

The defenders of the island were also protected by 500 stradiotes under the leadership of Stradioti Petros Bouas. He and his company of stradiotes were well known for fighting against the Ottomans in the Peloponnese for many years. They were probably in Zakynthos following another agreement with the Venetian Republic. Petros Bouas was also supported by Nikolaos Bochalis and Petros Bozikis and their own companies of stradiotes who arrived over last few years to the island from the Peloppnese and Napflion. Bozikis was Nikolaos Bochalis's first lieutenant. The matter was then referred to the Porte in Constantinople.

However, the forces of Gedik Ahmed Pasha did not wait for the reply and attacked the islanders of Zakynthos. Although they would have been outnumbered, the stradiotes and the local inhabitants managed to defeat the Ottomans twice in battle around the Castle and the town below. They also helped to capture and release hostages the Ottoman Turks had taken previously. The stradiotes again attacked and even took the equipment that was to be used to break the walls of the Castle. Pasha retaliated by attacking any ship near the island and continued small scale raids in the countryside of Zakynthos which was less well defended than the Castle and Aigialo.

Finally, a decision came from Constantinople. The Porte decided Zakynthos would become a possession of the Ottomans, but those Zakynthians who chose to could leave before the Ottomans pillaged and occupied the island. Consequently, thousands of Venetian subjects and autochthonous Zakhynthians duly left the island with the assistance of Antonio Loredan's ships. Most of them were transported to Napfaktos, Corfu, and the Peloponnese.

The Ottomans slipped 500 soldiers onto the island to capture the Zakynthians before they could leave. However, a group of 20 stradiotes noticed them around the Castle. Once notified, the rest of the stradiotes, and likely, local residents, surrounded these Ottomans and killed them all. Thus, the evacuation of most of the population was successful, and the Zakynthian people were spared the devastation wrought on Lefkada and Cephallonia. Nonetheless, a meaningful number of islandersy were left behind. Many might have hid in caves on the Vrachionas mountain range; however, vast amounts of their property were left to behind to be pillaged by the Ottomans.

On 5 November 1479, Gedik Ahmed Pasha gave the order to ravage and then occupy Zakynthos. His forces destroyed most of its churches, monasteries and many of its dwellings. The destruction was said to be horrific. For the time being they only decided to leave a small garrison in the Castle and did not decide to administer the island as a possession. Thus, in late 1479, after an existence of almost three centuries, the County palatine of Cephalonia and Zakynthos disappeared forever.

After a short stay in Rome, Leonardo III Tocco returned to Naples and proceeded to plan the recapture of his dominions. Shortly after the death of the Ottoman Sultan, Mehmed II in 1481, Leonardo III Tocco and a Neapolitan fleet in vain summoned the Ottoman Turkish leader of the garrisons of Cephalonia and Zakynthos to surrender. However, Leonardo III Tocco's brother Antonio and a band of Catalan mercenaries easily recovered the two islands as the Ottoman Turkish garrison was small. But Antonio's success alarmed the Venetians, which were fearful of the islands falling again into the hands of the King of Naples or his vassals. Additionally, they were unwilling to break their treaty with the Ottoman Empire and support Antiono Tocco's actions.

Consequently, the Venetian governor of Methoni dislodged Antonio Tocco and his band of Catalans from Zakynthos in 1482. Antonio Tocco hung on to Cephallonia for another year or so. However, he irritated the local inhabitants after giving his implicit support of corsairs using the island as a refuge. This also shocked the Venetians. And so, in 1483 after a futile attempt to bribe him, the Venetian Republic aided by many of the local inhabitants prepared to attack him. Thereupon, the garrison of the Fort of St George slew him and opened their gates to the Venetian commander. Lacking any opposition, he made himself master of the whole island and appointed its first Venetian governor.

Leonardo III Tocco pathetically asked for the restitution of the two islands from the new Sultan, Bayezid II. However, the Sultan demanded them for himself. In vain, Venice strove to retain Cephallonia but which in 1485 she accepted she had to cede to Bayezid II. It finally passed into her hands in 1500. But she succeeded in keeping Zakynthos on the condition of paying an annual tribute of 500 ducats.

As for the Tocco family, they made no further efforts to recover their island domain as the kings of Naples were now threatened by France, and had no wish to irritate the Sultan into a second attack upon Otranto.

== Venetian rule (1484–1797) ==
Flag of the Most Serene Republic of Venice

Ottoman rule lasted only until 22 April 1484; however, the Ottoman Turks did not completely occupy Zakynthos during that time – they only stationed a small garrison in the Castle. Then it was swapped with the Ottomans Turks by Venetian secretary Giovanni Dario, negotiator of the Treaty of Constantinople (1479), against neighboring Cephalonia and the provision of an annual tribute of 500 Venetian ducats. From then on Zakynthos remained an overseas colony of the Venetian Republic until its very end in 1797.

=== Administration of the island ===
Venetian rule largely protected the island from Ottoman domination but in its place an oligarchy was gradually established and maintained. As in Venice itself, the Venetian Republic divided Zakynthian society across three broad societal classes, the burghers or Cittadini (some later became nobles) and Popolari based in Zakynthos town and the rural Villani.

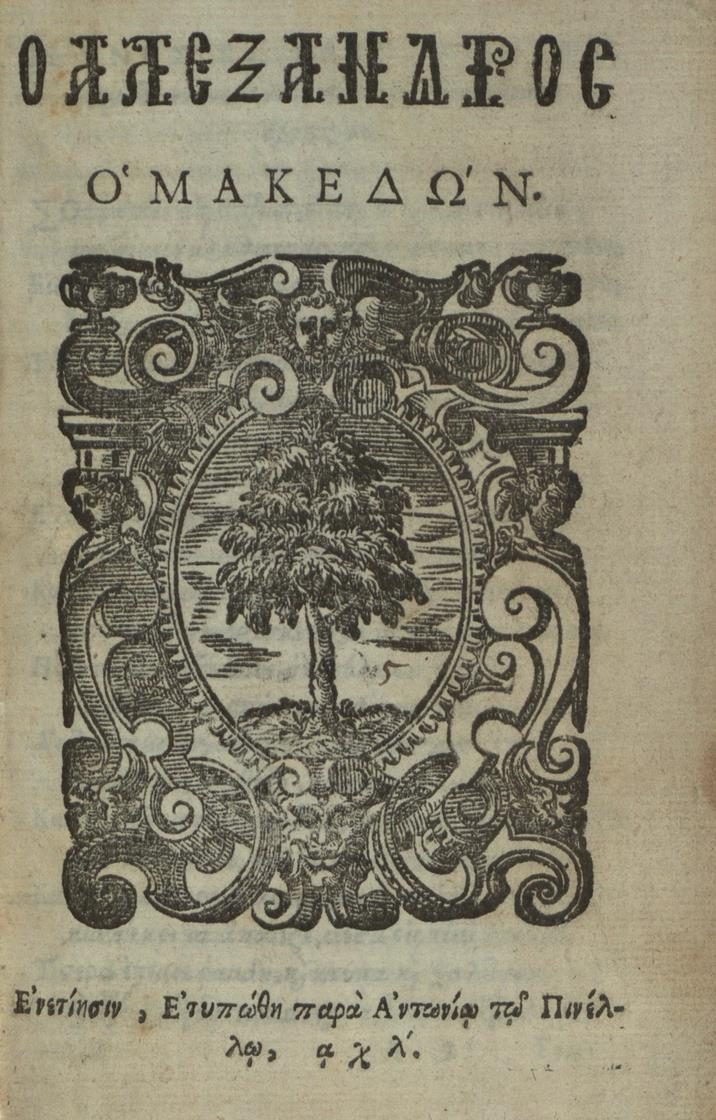
The verse edition (Rimada) of the Romance of Alexander the Great, 1620 edition. The first edition was published in Venice by Zakynthian Dimitrios Zinos in 1529.

The supreme civil and military governor of the Ionian Islands was the provveditore generale da Mar in Corfu. Authority on Zakynthos was divided into the Venetian and domestic authorities. The Venetian authorities represented the sovereign state and its political and military power over Zakynthos. The domestic authorities were appointed by the local Community Council, which included mostly local Greeks but some Latins as well. The Venetian authorities were led by a provveditore and were appointed by the Great Council of Venice. The provveditore's responsibilities included security from hostile raids, taxation, religious and other issues and was appointed for about two years. The subordinate Venetian officials were the two consiglieri who performed administrative and judicial functions along with the Provveditore. These three Venetian officials constituted the "regime" of Zakynthos.

Initially, the Community Council was a relatively open institution including autochthonous inhabitants, large landowners, traders, shippers, notaries and secretaries, professionals, craftsmen, refugees and Stradioti. Gradually, from the middle of the 16th century, efforts were made to "cleanse" the Community Council with the establishment of a Small Council of 150 and the implementation of civic criteria such as the exclusion of foreigners, illegitimate offspring, manual workers and non-residents of Zakynthos town. This led to the establishment of the Libro d'Oro, first compiled on Zakynthos in 1542. It was a formal directory of Cittadini and represented the "nobility" among the members of the Community Council.

Initially, the main opposition to these measures were wealthy foreign merchants from mainland Greece and Italy and manual workers but gradually wealthy local merchants from often humble origins, who had become rich on mostly currant production and trade, resisted the efforts of the Cittadini. The constant influx of refugees from mainland Greece complicated the complex struggle for power and influence in Zakynthos town.

In 1578, the Small Council of 150 deprived, without the permission of Venice, the Communal Council of its right to annually elect the 150 and control the membership of the Communal Council; thereby depriving its right to choose the candidates for the Small Council. Consequently, the Communal Council was stripped of effective power. By the 17th century, the criteria for entry into the Community Council had become fixed and only those families who fulfilled the criteria of birthright were accepted. In 1683, the council was closed to 93 familie; a nobility of sorts became established, although these so-called nobles were never officially recognised by Venice.

The members of the Community Council were given a number of rights. The most important right was the ability to send ambassadors and petition to Venice on behalf of the Zakynthian population – in practice they mostly petitioned for benefits accruing to themselves at the expense of the rest of the local population. And the right of local administration which as stated above was shared to some extent with Venetian officials appointed by Venice. Some of these local administrative offices included: judges, health and market inspectors, security officials, charitable institutions, galley captains,.

The cultural influence of Venice was considerable. The wealthy made a habit of sending their sons to Italy to be educated. Good examples are Dionysios Solomos, a native of Zakynthos and Greece's national poet, and Ugo Foscolo, also native of Zakynthos and a national Italian poet. However, apart from the wealthy, an overwhelming proportion of the population; particularly, from the Cittadini, Popolari and Villani would have spoken Greek and adhered to the Orthodox faith.

=== Stradioti ===
When Zakynthos became a Venetian holding in 1484, the Venetian Republic sought to repopulate the island as the native population had dwindled. The Turkish raids in 1479 are believed to have resulted in many inhabitants hiding in the mountains or escaping the island altogether. Consequently, Venice attempted to entice settlers and Greek refugees from mostly mainland Greece with parcels of land and fiscal privileges – initially these attempts we not successful but they improved later as Venice experienced reversals in mainland Greece. Many of these settlers and refugees were Stradioti, who were expected to provide and upkeep their horses and be ready to serve in war.

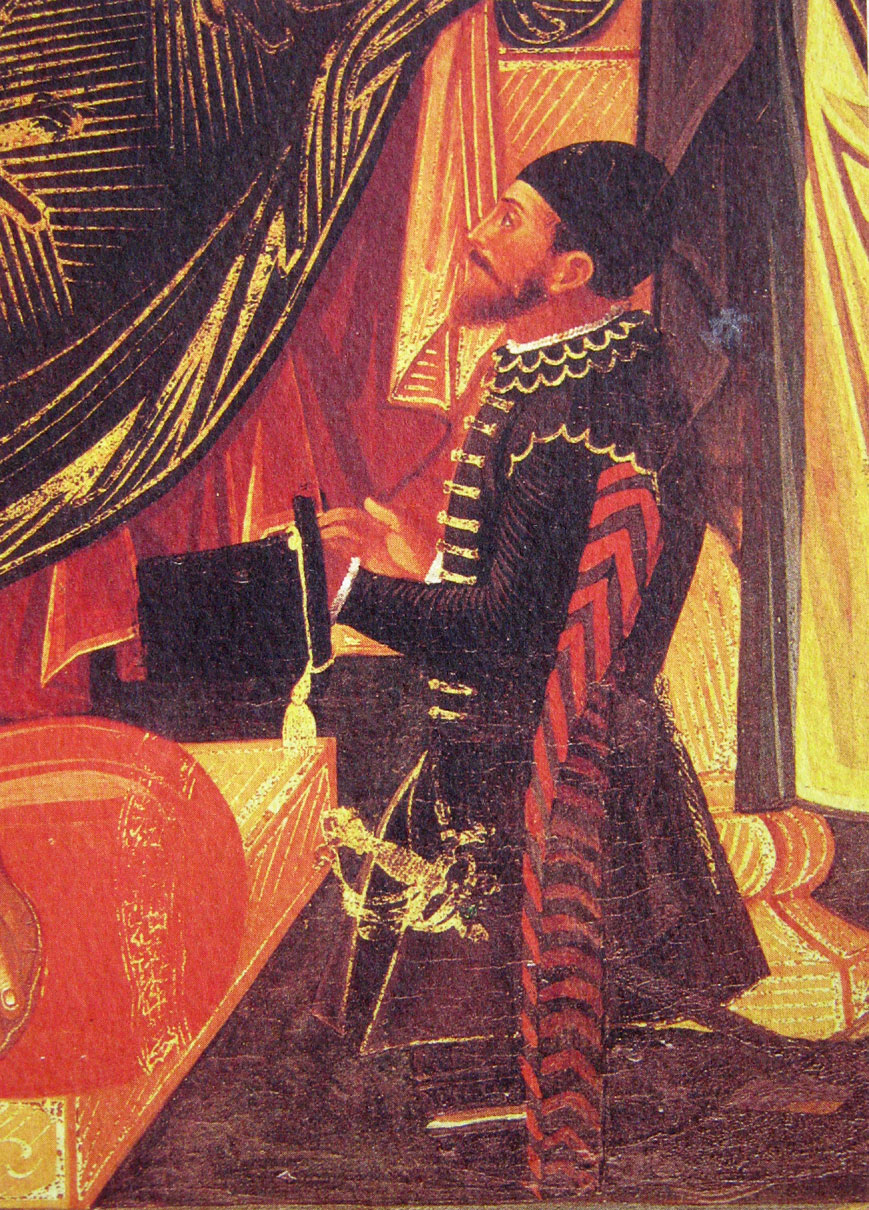
Icon of the Stradioti Manessis (probably Comin Manessis) by unknown artist in San Giorgio dei Greci, Venice 1546

Stradioti were mounted troops of Greek and Albanian origin. Initially, they entered Venetian military service during the Venetian Republic's wars against the Ottoman Empire in the 15th century. As Venetian holdings were gradually conquered by the Ottomans, Stradioti were stationed and resettled in other Venetian holdings such as Zakynthos. Shortly after 1498, 150 Stradioti and their families were settled on the island.

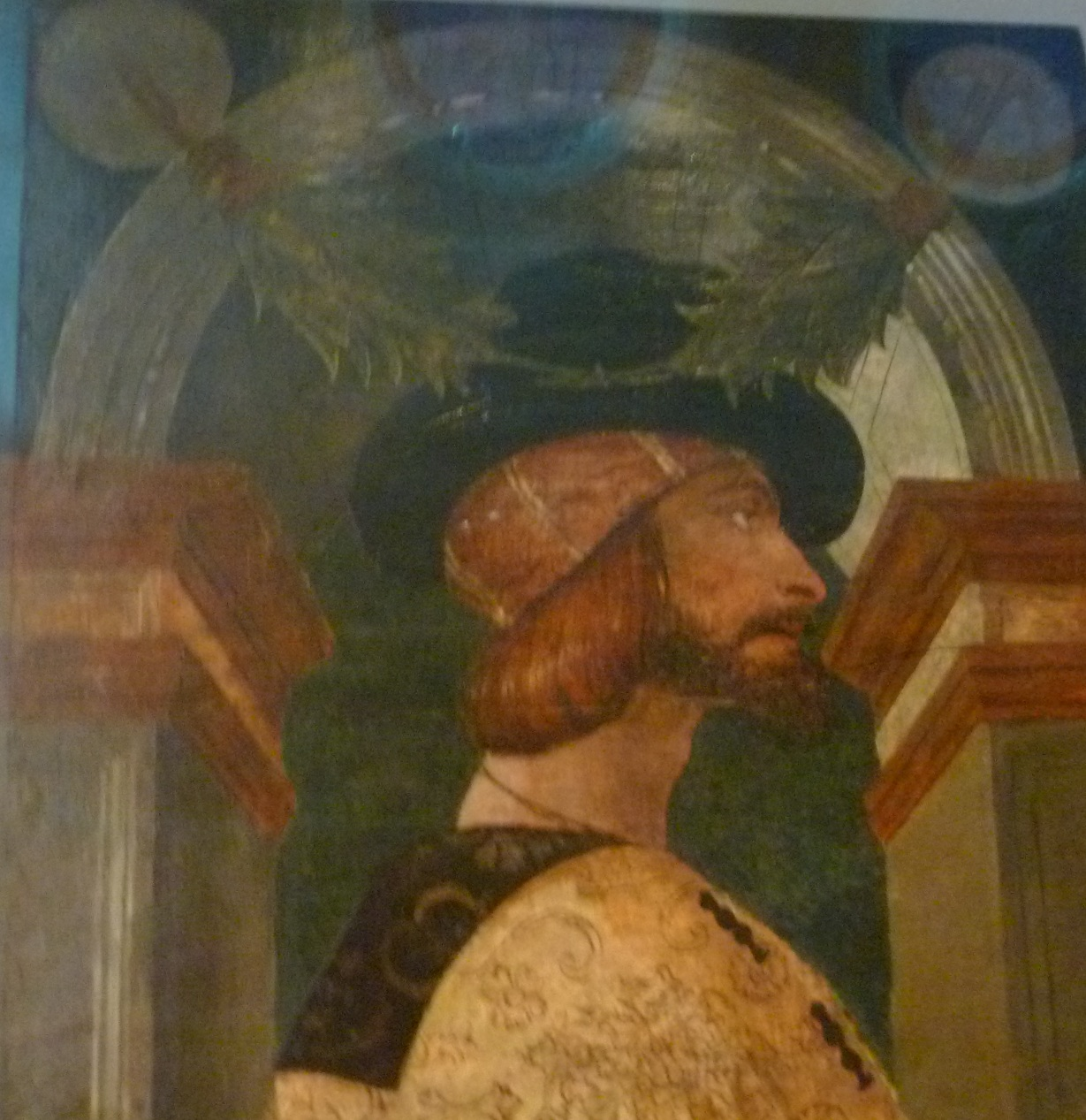
Likely portrait of Theodoros Palaiologos by unknown artist in Victoria and Albert Museum, c. 1477–1491

In 1483, Theodoros Palaiologos and his brother Georgios (their relationship to the imperial Palaiologos dynasty is unclear) became governors of the Stradioti in Zakynthos and were granted properties on the island, including the island of Marathonisi in the bay of Laganas, for their service to Venice. In early 1485, they also moved their extended families to the island. Theodoros Palaiologos played a vital role in improving the standing of the Stradioti in Zakynthos in the face of the locals, who sought to retain their power and privileges. After the earthquake of 1513, Theodoros Palaiologos moved his extended family to Venice; however, most of his company of Stradioti remained on the island.

Some family names of the Stradioti include the Soumakis, Roussianos, Chalkomatas from Nafplion, Kapnisis, Commoutos, Minotos, Nomikos from Methoni, Melissinos, Kontostavlis and Skiadopoulos from Mani and Tzibletis, Kumvis, Karreris and Derossis from Cyprus. Other populations also settled on Zakynthos which were not held by Venice but were battlegrounds between Ottoman and Venetian forces such as Mani in the Peloponnese. Even some families from mainland Italy were settled in Zakynthos who were fleeing civil wars going on at that time. They included the less Hellenised at that time of Salviati, Mediki, Valterra, Serra, Bentivolia and Merkati. These waves of Stradioti and refugees resulted in an island population of mixed classes of soldiers and refugees. By 1621, the settlement of people from certain areas was so dense in certain areas of Zakynthos town that the neighbourhood was named after them like Maniatika given the high proportion of people from Mani.

Stradioti continued to be employed by Venice as rural gendarmes in the Terra Firma well into the 17th century. Stradioti companies also continued to be garrisoned in some of the towns of Cephalonia, Corfu and Zakynthos. In Zakynthos, a slightly different company of Stradioti from those guarding Zakynthos town were given the responsibility to guard the coast from the frequent pirate raids. They were considered the better fighters with the best horses on the island. They generally kept watch from watchtowers (which are still found on the island) during summer when pirate raids were more numerous and organised themselves using fire or smoke signals to gather fellow Stradioti and defend the island against a raiding party.

Stradioti continued their service into the 18th century but over time they virtually became a hereditary caste. Some of the Stradioti or their descendants became members of the Ionian nobility while others took to farming.

=== Zakynthos in the Second Ottoman–Venetian War ===
The Second Ottoman–Venetian War (1499–1503) saw the Ottoman Turks, under the command of admiral Kemal Reis, make substantial gains against Venice. In 1499, the Ottoman fleet under Kemal Reis and the army under Mustafa Pasha laid siege to the strategically important Venetian outpost of Nafpaktos.

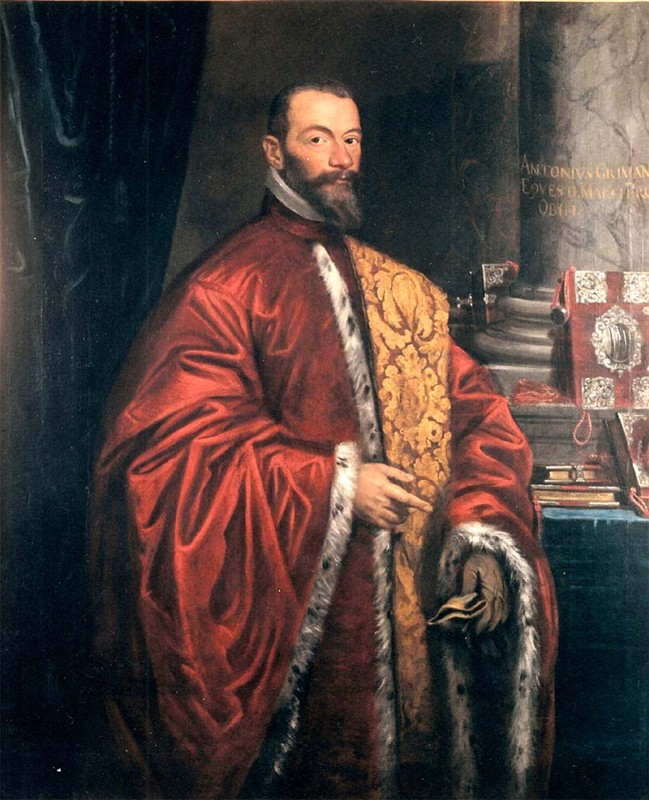
Portrait of Antonio Grimani by Domenico Tintoretto in private collection, Milan c. early 17th century

The news of the approaching Ottoman fleet sent the provveditore of Zakynthos, Nicolo Ferro, and the people of the island into a state of panic given that the Sultan's representatives had protested several times recently to the Venetian ambassador in Constantinople about the reconstruction of the Castle of Zakynthos being in violation of their treaty. In retaliation, the Porte threatened to attack the island. Fears of an attack were magnified when Vola Leudari traveled from Corfu to Venice and reported to the Venetian Senate in July 1499 that the Porte was greatly dissatisfied with the Republic for its failure to abide by the terms of the treaty, as well as the Venetians' providing shelter to a number of Christian corsairs and pirates preying on Ottoman shipping. Ferro continued to communicate his anxiety and the fears of Zakynthians about a possible Ottoman attack on three separate occasions to the Senate during April and May 1499. He also requested permission to spend on strengthening the fortifications of the castle. A month later, Ferro sent another letter to the Senate about the appearance of the Ottoman fleet in Zakynthian waters.

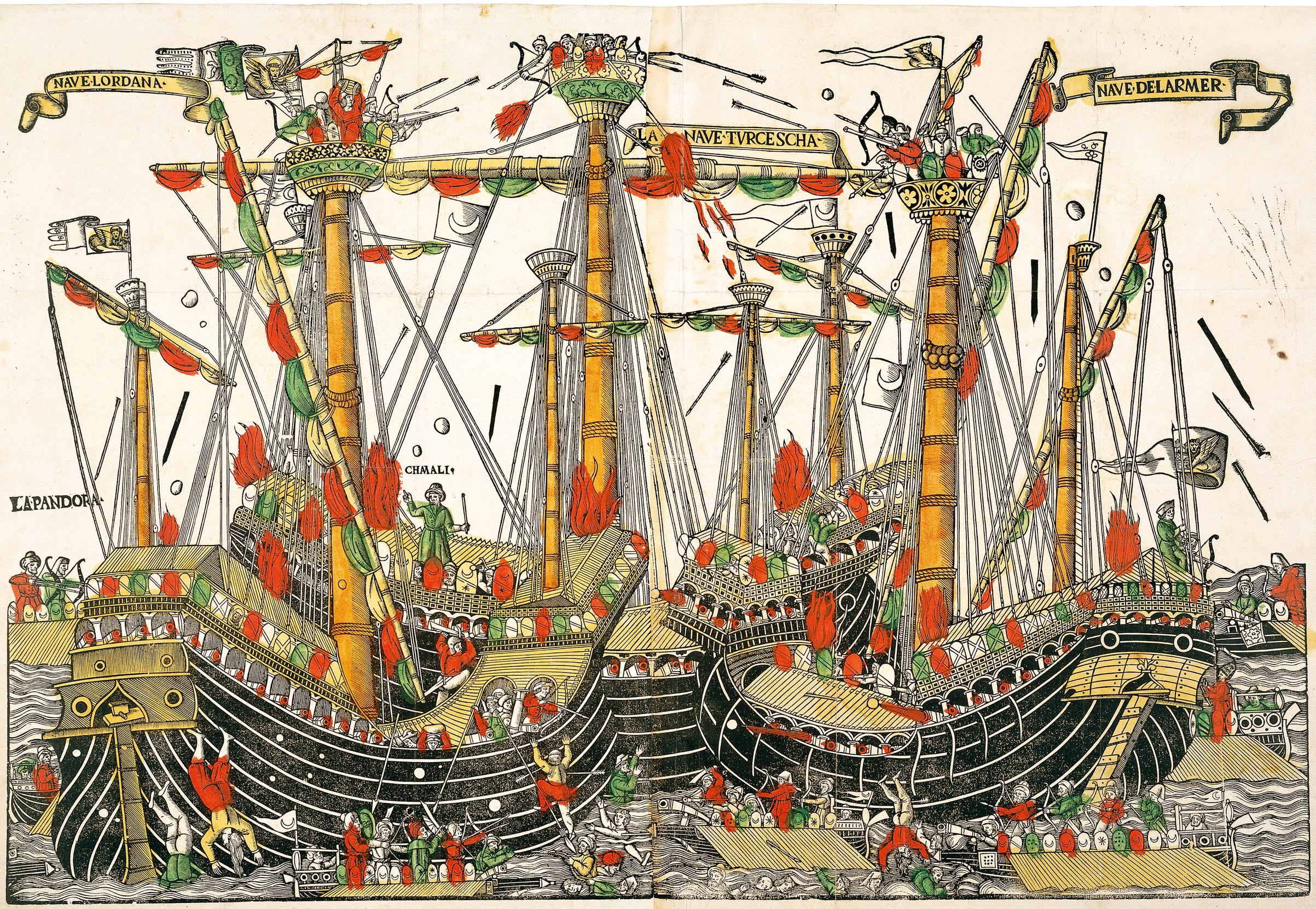
The battle of Zonchio by unknown Venetian artist in British Museum, c. 16th century

In August 1499, the two opposing fleets chased each other up and down the coasts of the Peloponnese, before Kemal Reis finally engaged in a series of battles – some of which occurred just south of Zakynthos – and then unexpectedly defeated the Venetian fleet under Antonio Grimani at the Battle of Zonchio. A French fleet of 22 ships, composed largely of Hospitallers and commanded by Gonzave de Cordone, had arrived in the Ionian Sea in mid-August and had anchored near Zakynthos with the intention of assisting the venetians. Grimani had urged the French commander to stay in Zakynthos because of the continuous movements of the Ottoman fleet nearby. However, the two allies fell out and the French decided to attack Kefalonia, which was then held by the Ottomans. The disagreement between the Venetians and the French allowed the Ottoman fleet to enter the Gulf of Corinth and head towards Napfaktos to coordinate their efforts with the land forces under Mustafa Pasha. A little earlier, by order of Grimani, a company of Stradioti from Zakynthos, under the command of Theodoros Palaiologos was sent to Nafpaktos to reinforce the castle, but they were unable to prevent its surrender on 29 August 1499. In early September 1499, Antonio Grimani and his fleet sailed to Zakynthos. A few days later, Palaiologos and his Stradioti returned to the island and announced to Grimani the news of the fall of Nafpaktos.

Napfaktos had approximately 7,000 inhabitants at the time of its surrender. Many of those inhabitants were allowed to leave following an agreement with the Ottoman Turks. In October 1499, many soldiers from Napfaktos made a request to the Venetian Senate to serve in the Venetian forces – their request was accepted shortly after. Many of those soldiers and their families were then allowed to settle and provided with land to cultivate in Zakynthos. Some of the most leaders of these soldiers were the families of Daras, Petas, Mazarakis and Torelis, and prominent families of soldiers were the families of Bouas, Mountanou, Helmis, Grammatikopoulos, Fratis, Mouzakis, Giannitzis, Flokas, Labetis and Kontis. Some of these continue to be prominent on the island today. In a strange twist, some of those allowed to re-settle were prior refugees from Zakynthos who had fled to Napfaktos following the raids of 1479.

In anticipation of an imminent attack by the Ottoman Turks, the Zakynthians had started to sell their horses and flee the island with their families and their movable belongings. To deal with the depopulation of the island and decreasing manpower to defend it, Antonio Grimani took the extraordinary step of proclaiming to the people of Zakynthos that his forces would confiscate the movable and immovable property of those who chose to flee from the island. In the meantime, Nicolo Ferro was replaced by Grimnani with Nicolo Marcello, who had served as an assistant to the provveditore and as a sopracomito (galley captain) of the island. The new sopracomito was the son of Nicolo Marcello, Nadal Marcello. Fortification work on the castle in Zakynthos continued apace and the forces assigned to defend the island began to gather. Moro Bianco, who had served in Zakynythos as contestible, was appointed to lead the military forces guarding the castle. Jacometto da Novello was specifically hired from Corfu to lead a company of mercenary recruits from Italy. Theodoros Palaiologos and his company of Stradioti had returned to the island and were training with their war horses. The provvedittore, Nicolo Marcello reduced taxes for the Stradioti to encourage them to stay and fight. And the help of his three military leaders he prepared the unarmed population for the defence of the island.

Despite the fear of an imminent attack on the island, the military leaders of Zakynthos gathered their forces for a planned attack on the Castle of Saint George in Kefalonia toward the end of 1499. Antonio Grimani also called for missions from Corfu, Zakynthos, Methoni and Koroni. During the first days of December, Theodoros Palaiologos sent about 120 Italians, 52 war horses on the galleys of Nadal Marcello and others. However, they were unsuccessful and returned in March 1500, having lost two-thirds of their forces. Many families from Kefalonia also found refuge in Zakynthos. The Zakynthians remained on high alert during this period due to raids by small Ottoman naval forces. For example, on 29 May 1500, Nicolo Marcello sent a letter to Venice regarding the abduction of 22 nuns and raid of valuable items from the island of Strofades off the coast of Zakynthos.

==== Fall of Methoni and Koroni (1500) ====
Bayezid II made further demands on the Venetian Republic in the following months which included Methoni and Koroni. These two strategic towns were often called the two eyes of the Republic as they acted as important early warning posts into the Ionian and then Adriatic Seas and also valuable ports of call for Venetian shipping or Venetian-bound shipping.

By July 1500, the Ottoman Turks had renewed their fleet at Napfaktos and Preveza and set off for Methoni. Their land forces also traveled through the Peloponnese towards the town. The Venetians had gathered their fleet at Zakynthos under their new admiral, Benedetto Pesaro. Unfortunately, the Venetian fleet was no match for their Ottoman foe and allies were not forthcoming at this time. Despite this they set sail towards Methoni to defend it.

From Zakynthos the Venetians recruited 50 Italian soldiers from the company of Jacomo da Novello, eight gunmen, 35 lightly infantry and 270 Zakynthian Stradioti. 60 more Italians soldiers, 60 Zakynthian Stradioti, 36 lightly armed spearmen and 65 Spanish soldiers were added. Consequently, the defence of the island was now severely depleted and the unarmed Zakynthian civilians were increasingly alarmed. So much so they threatened the provviditore, Nicolo Marcello because he had allowed the soldiers to leave the island to defend Methoni leaving only around 50 soldiers to guard the castle. Unsurprisingly, in July 1500 a small Ottoman party raided the island burning houses and carrying off many valuables. Many Zakynthians had fled once again to the mountains in anticipation of much larger raids. The provvidetore urged Benedetto Pesaro to send back some soldiers to defend the island but as far as we know to no avail.

In July 1500, Kemal Reis and his Ottoman armada met the Venetians at Navarino again (often called the Second battle of Navarino/Sapienza) and defeated them once more. They then sailed towards Methoni to blockade it. It was badly provisioned by the Venetians and despite a desperate struggle by the defenders and the Venetians, it was surrendered on 10 August 1500. Fortunately, many of the civilians of Methoni had been evacuated to Zakynthos before the battle. Some of these included the De Francescis, Lefkohilos, Kapnisis, Komoutos, Koutouvalis, Minotos, Nomikos and Strouzas families. Some of these families remain prominent to our day. As for the rest, the Ottoman Turks showed no mercy and massacred the defenders that had survived their assault. Some were impaled, tied to flaying posts or left in the open to have their insides eat by dogs. Apparently, the fires from the burning town could be seen from Zakynthos – which would have further terrorised the islanders already fearing an imminent attack on their relatively undefended island.

Almost immediately, the Ottoman Turks traveled to nearby Koroni and demanded its surrender. Shortly after on 15 August 1500 it capitulated as well. Within a few days Pylos (Navarino) also fell. Tragically, in less than a week, Methoni and Koroni, the two eyes of the Republic, were lost. Napflion and Monemvassia were the only two Venetian possessions remaining in the Peloponnese. The road was open more than ever for the Ottoman Turks to move on the Venetian possessions in the Ionian Islands of Zakynthos and Corfu who were now inadequately defended.

However, one benefit to the Zakynthian economy was that Zakynthos and Corfu replaced Methoni and Koroni as stopping points for Venice-bound ships or ships heading from Venice towards Constantinople, Egypt and the Levant. These ports also became important as a layover for pilgrims travelling to the Holy Land. Regardless, the Venetian Doge Agostino Barbarigo desperately requested assistance from the Pope and the Catholic Monarchs to stem the Ottoman tide.

In September 1500, Kemal Reis and his naval forces assaulted Voiussa and in October he appeared at Cape Santa Maria on the Island of Lefkada, before ending the campaign and returning to Constantinople in November 1500.

==== Siege of Kefalonia (1500) ====
In August 1500, the admiral of the fleet, Benedetto Pesaro and other Venetian officers recognized the need reinforce the defenses of their remaining holdings in the Mediterranean including Zakynthos. This included further strengthening of the fortifications of the castle of Zakynthos, perhaps building a larger port and a greater number of soldiers to defend the island its increasingly key geographical location. The Venetian Senate decided to send to the providditore, Nicolo Marcello, ten thousand ducats, technicians, craftsmen and materials to improve the fortifications of the castle. For this purpose, Jacomo Coltrin, who had worked on the fortifications of the castle in Corfu set sail to Zakynthos to inspect the works of the fortification of the castle and to advise as best possible.

A second meeting between the Venetian admiral, Benedetto Pesaro and Venetian officers was held in August. Given the recognition of Zakynthos's increased importance to Venetian trade, it was decided a new marina was to be built in Zakynthos town just below the fortified castle to provide further safe anchorage to the increased number of ships which were expected to visit the island. A separate company of soldiers was also established to guard the port.

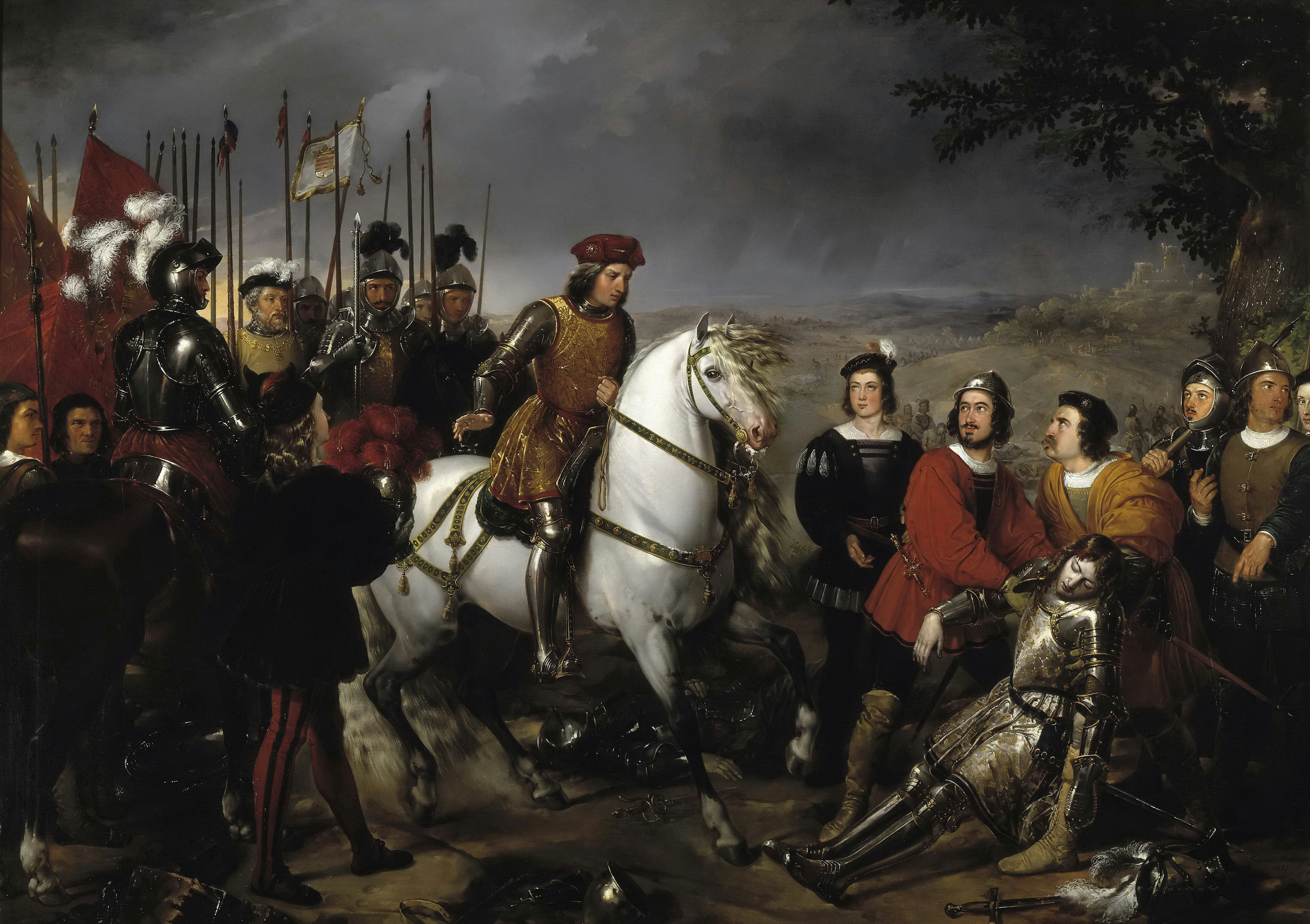
Battle of Cerignola: El Gran Capitan (Gonzalo Fernandez de Cordoba) finds the corpse of Louis d'Armagnac, Duke of Nemours by Federico de Madrazo in Prado Museum, 1835

The defense of the castle of Zakynthos was conducted by Alfonso da Fan with 80 Italian mercenaries, Moro Bianco with 106 Italian soldiers and Jacometto da Novello with the 27 of the 170 Italian mercenaries who survived the first siege of Kefalonia in late 1499. In September, 55 soldiers who had been taken hostage by the Ottoman forces during the siege of Pylos found their way back to Zakynthos and joined the defence of the island. And another 50 soldiers from Zakynthos found their way back to the island after the fall of the Methoni and were transferred back to the island and into its defensive force. Despite these actions, the population of Zakynthos remained terrified and demanded from the Venetian admiral, Benefetto Pesaro and the provviditore, Nicolo Marcello permission for unarmed civilians to leave the island for Corfu, Dalmatia, Friuli or Apulia. To reassure the population, Benedetto Pesaro left a small armed fleet for the defense of the island and a caravel which could, if needed, transport the civilian population away from the island. Regardless, there is evidence of some Stradioti and their families fleeing the island and making their way to Apulia.

In the meantime, the absence of the Ottoman fleet in the Ionian and Aegean Seas towards the end of 1500 provided the Venetians the opportunity to raid islands in the eastern Aegean and all the way to the coast of Anatolia before they returned to port in Zakynthos. In response, to the Venetian calls for help against the Ottoman Turks, the Spanish and French monarchs agreed to send a fleet to Zakynthos under the command of Gonzalo Fernandez de Cordoba also known as Gran Capitan. The Spanish fleet anchored in Zakynthos for several days. While they waited, the Spanish sent five ships to sail around the western and south-western areas of the Peloponnese to collect information on the plans of the Ottoman forces. A Zakynthian soldier and spy, knowledgeable with the language, leaders and situation of the Peloponnese was placed on board each ship.

Although the Venetians had made plans to take back Methoni, they decided after discussions with the Spanish, to advance on Kefalonia again. And so, by November 1500, the Spanish-Venetian armada commanded by Gonzalo de Córdoba was anchored in the Kefalonian port of Argostoli whilst the Ottoman guard were holed up in the Castle of St George. On November 8 the siege began. Despite fierce resistance by the defenders, in December 1500, the combined Spanish–Venetian forces took the castle of St George on Kefalonia and the few remaining Ottoman guards eventually surrendered. The Spanish fleet returned to their base Sicily but the Venetian naval forces carried on and recovered Lefkada. These two victories temporarily halted the Ottoman offensive on eastern Venetian territories.

A company of Zakynthian Stradioti participated in the siege of Kefalonia under the command of Markos Sigouros. He had previously been recognised in previous Venetian battles. Markos Sigouros was one of the first to scale the walls of the Castle of St George; however, shortly after he was killed by an arrow to the heart. The Sigouros family was settled in Zakynthos during the rule of the Tocco family and embraced Orthodoxy; however, many of them had fled the island during the Ottoman raids of 1479. As a reward for Markos Sigouro's faithful service to Venice, she duly rewarded the Sigouros family with a fief, the title of baron and the restitution of their property that was appropriated after 1479. They would become one of the most prominent families in Zakynthian history.

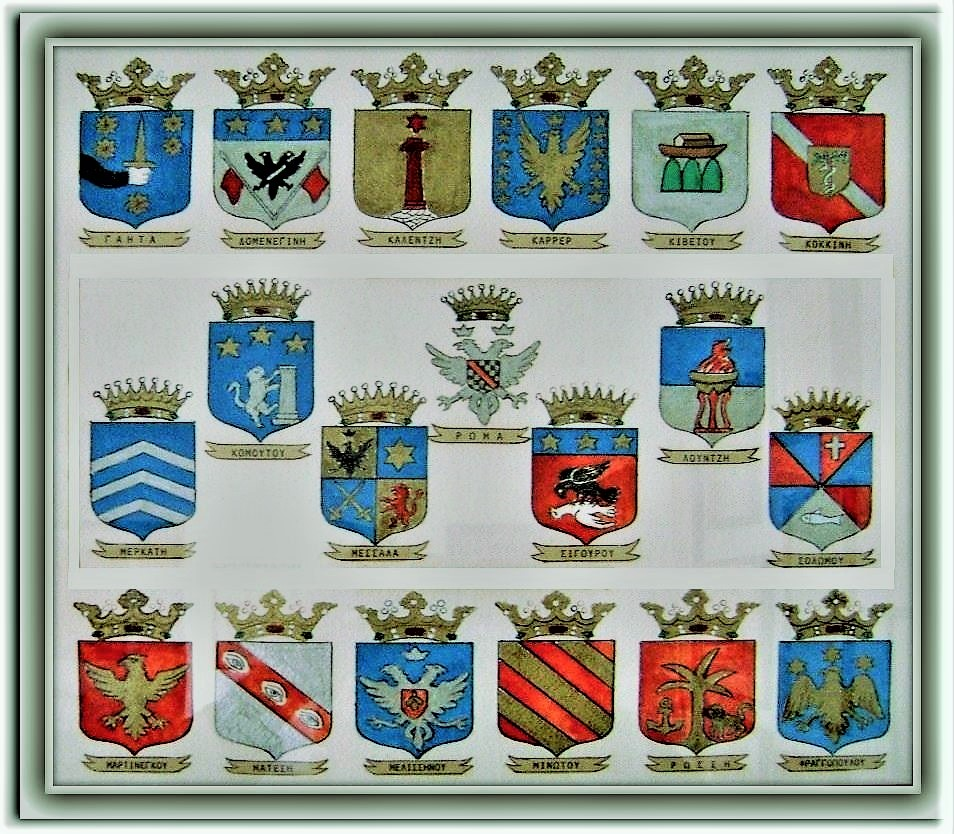
Coat of arms of some prominent Zakynthian families including the family of Sigouros

However, the Ottoman incursions in Dalmatia escalated to the point where Venice was forced to sign a treaty with Vladislaus II of Hungary and Pope Alexander VI by which they pledged 140,000 ducats a year for the Kingdom of Hungary to actively defend its southern Croatian territories. By 1503, Venice and the Ottoman Empire agreed to an armistice. Ottoman raids then reached Venetian territory in northern Italy, and so Venice was forced to recognize their gains, and end the war. However, it did gain Kefalonia – which then went on to develop in parallel with Zakynthos – but had to hand back Lefkada. Venice was still obliged to pay 500 ducats annually to the Porte for Zakynthos.

Even with some respite in the fighting, the Zakynthians knew that the Ottoman raids would not cease. Jacomo Coltrin visited Zakynthos again on in 1501 to inspect the works on the castle and elsewhere but these works were delayed because of a disagreement with the provviditore. A short while later, despite continued protestations by the Porte regarding the fortification of the castle of Zakynthos, the new provvidotore of Zakynthos, Piero Foscolo continued the works on the castle. In 1503, he announced to the Venetian Senate the completion of the works.

=== Battle of Methoni (1531) ===
During the early 16th century, the Venetian Republic had refrained from partaking in European campaigns against the Ottoman Turks given its vital interests in the Adriatic and the eastern Mediterranean including Zakynthos. It also tried to remain above the fray when Charles V, Holy Roman Emperor, ruler of Imperial Spain and Habsburg Netherlands and the Knights of St John of Malta (recently re-located from Rhodes) attempted seize Methoni in 1531 and Koroni in 1532 from the Ottoman Turks. In August 1531, the Knights of St John of Malta led by Fra Bernardo Salviati headed towards Methoni. They were joined by 200 Zakynthians led by Ioannis Skandalis. The Zakynthians traveled as merchants on brigantine ships supposedly transporting wine and timber. Some sources even claim some of them were dressed as Ottoman Janissaries. A few scholars believe that many of these Zakynthians were former inhabitants of Methoni and Koroni and perhaps were moved to Zakynthos by the Venetians when those cities fell to the Ottoman Turks only 31 years before in 1500.

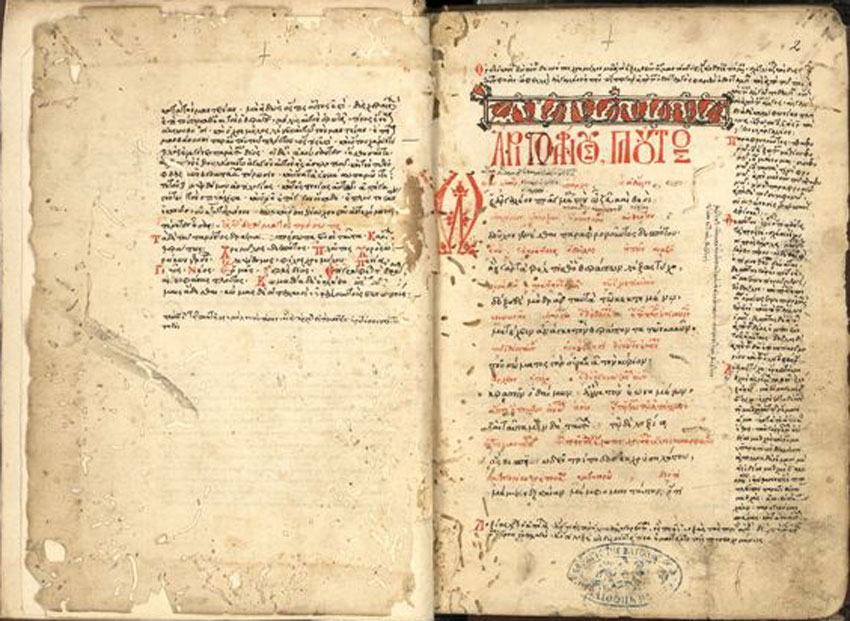
Codex 33 manuscript of ancient authors such as Sophocles's Ajax, Aristophanes's Wealth and a genealogical tree of Aeschylus with scholia by Pachomios Rousanos, c. 1540

The fleet of the Knights of Malta waited nearby at the island of Sapienza. Skandalis's father, Nikolaos lived in Methoni as a crypto-Christian, worked in customs and the guard of the port. When the merchant ships arrived Nikolaos Skandalis invited Ioannnis Skandalis and his Zakynthian crew and the Ottoman port authorities to a small celebration for their safe arrival. The Ottoman authorities became heavily drunk and feel asleep. Just before dawn some of the Knights of St of John of Malta, who were hiding in the lumber, crept out and attacked the port guards, seized the main gate, and fired a cannon to signal to the squadron anchored at Sapienza to help them take the city. The Turkish garrison and their families shut themselves up in the palace. The fleet at Sapienza was late in coming to Methoni and shortly a Turkish relieving fleet arrived. The Knights of Malta and Ioannis Skandalis and his Zakynthians abandoned Methoni shortly after; although, they carried of 1600 prisoners.

When news reached Venice that Zakynthians, who were ostensibly Venetian subjects, were in contravention of Venetian policy they decided to act. In October 1531, they endeavoured to pursue and punish the Zakynthian leaders and participants of this ill-fated campaign to conquer Methoni. The Ottoman Turks also raised objections to Venice that this campaign by the Zakynthians would endanger the good relations and trade between the Venetian Republic and the Ottoman Empire. In fact, some sources suggest that the Ottoman Turks of the Peloponnese considered the Zakynthians responsible for the attack. However, rather than return to Zakynthos, the 200 Zakynthians sailed to Malta and with their own ships participated in piracy around the Peloponnese. Later, they joined the Genoese admiral, Andrea Doria's campaign against the city of Koroni.

Around late 1531, a squadron of ships of Charles V and Andrea Dorias anchored near Keri, Zakynthos. The Sultan threatened to raid Zakynthos in revenge for the participation of the Zakynthians in their attempt to conquer Methoni and because Doria's ships were anchored near Keri. In 1532, a Turkish fleet arrived in the port of Zakynthos. The Communal Council and other local authorities welcomed the fleet but the Zakynthian people fled to the Castle or into the mountains. The Turkish admiral and his entourage requested a riding tour of parts of the island which members of the Communal Council such as Ioannis Sigouros and others obliged. They also provided a feast for the visiting admiral. The Turkish squadron departed shortly after and to show their appreciation, set free some Zakynthians they had previously taken hostage.

=== Siege of Koroni (1532) ===
The Turkish naval squadron returned to Zakynthos and anchored near Argassi. The naval forces of Charles V and Andrea Doria were now anchored near Katastari and Venetian galleys arrived and anchored near Skinari. Despite the strict order from Venice, the local Zakynthians assisted the ships of Charles V and Andrea Doria with supplies of food. Some of the 200 Zakynthians who had previously tried to conquer Methoni in 1531 appeared and committed to assist Charles V and Andrea Dorea to conquer Koroni. Venice sent out an order again to capture the Zakynthians leaders of this campaign, hang them and tie their bodies up in chains in Zakynthos town. The participants were to have their property confiscated and exiled from Zakynthos and other Venetian territories.

After the ill-dated attempt at conquering Methoni in 1531, some of the Zakynthians sailed to Malta and then partook in piracy around the Peloponnese before participating in the siege and conquest of Koroni. In 1532, the Emperor Charles V ordered the Genoese admiral Andrea Doria to attack it as a diversion to the campaigns of the Little War in Hungary. Doria managed to capture the city after a few days siege with the assistance of Zakynthians and defeating a Turkish reliving force of 500 cavalry. The Turkish garrison asked for terms and was granted safe passage for their wives and children and goods. The Papal and Imperial banners were raised over the battlements. Andrea Doria's forces then to lay waste to the surrounding coast. Shortly, afterwards he occupied Patras. However, in 1533, the Ottoman Emperor Suleiman the Magnificent sent 60 galleys to retake the Koroni. They blockaded the harbour, but they were defeated by Doria, highlighting the weakness of the Ottoman Navy at that time. An Ottoman land army however was successful in laying a siege around the city, forcing its surrender on 1 April 1534. The weakened Christian garrison was allowed to leave the city unharmed.

Venetian made diplomatic overtures to Imperial Spain, concerned the Zakynthians might shift their allegiance with Imperial Spain and the forces of Andrea Doria. The Zakynthian exiles did not stay away from the island for long and by 4 June 1533 many had returned from their campaign at Koroni, were armed and staying in Zakynthos town and rural Zakynthos. Venice again sent out a message that the exiles must leave the island or risk being executed.

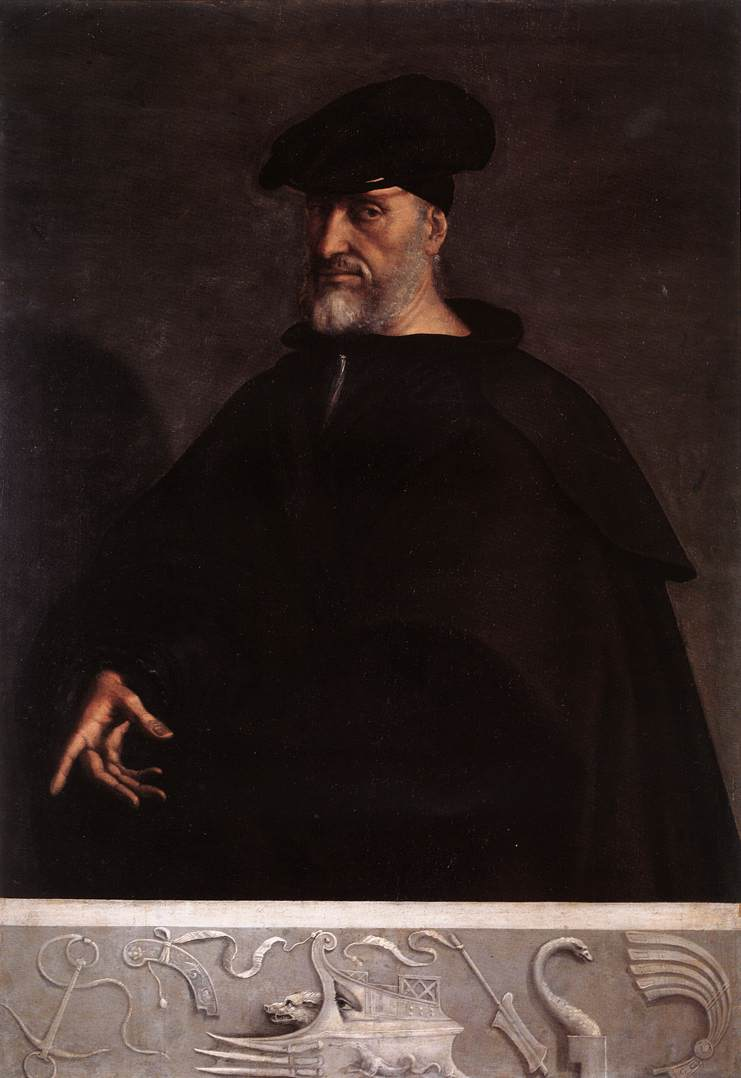
Portrait of Andrea Doria, circa 1526, oil on board, Villa del Principe, Genoa

With the outbreak of the Venetian-Turkish war of 1537–1540, the foreign policy of Venice changed. In February 1538, Venice entered into a treaty with Charles V and the Papacy against the Ottoman Turks. Later that month, Venice invited the Zakynthian exiles back to Zakynthos and gave them their freedom requiring their services to protect the island from possible Ottoman attacks.

=== Currant Production and Trade ===
Shortly after the establishment of Venetian rule in 1484, Venice sought to repopulate Zakynthos with the resettlement of many Stradioti and refugees from mainland Greece to stimulate the production of grain. Not long after, it is reported Zakynthos was exporting grain mostly to Venice to meet the demand by its fleet.

As early as the 1540s, the increase in the cultivation of currants in Zakynthos and Cephalonia attracted the attention of the local Rettore. Even by 1533, there are reports of direct trade in currants between the Ionian Islands and England without the trade being routed via Venice and so avoiding duties. In response, Venice tried to stop the proliferation of currant plantations as they were deemed potentially dangerous for Zakynthos's grain production. The situation had become so dire for Venice that by the early 1580s it is reported that Zakynthos had gone from being self-sufficient in grain to having only 3 months of supplies for local consumption and relying on imports from Ottoman territories. Venice recognised this was not viable in case of war with the Ottoman Empire. However, the farmers and merchants of Zakynthos continued to cultivate more currants – it was reported a field of currants yielded up to 60 ducats of profit, whilst a field of grain yielded around 6.

One of the primary reasons currants became so much more profitable than grain was the increasing demand from the English market and the emerging relationship with English merchants in evading customs duties. In 1545, for the first time, there was some alarm regarding customs evasion, as the local authorities on Zakynthos were concerned that foreign merchants, later identified as English, were exporting out of Zakynthos and Cephalonia with the support of local inhabitants. In 1580, the returning Rettori from Zakynthos and Cephalonia – Gabriele Emo and Alvise Lando – highlighted the increased English presence in the islands. Emo and Lando recommended that an additional levy be raised to offset their encroachment on local trade.

Despite this, currant production continued to grow becoming an important cash crop and a major factor behind economic fluctuations and outbreaks of civil unrest in Zakynthos for the next few centuries. Zakynthos became so synonymous for currants that the product became known as Zante Currant in England and is still called this in many English-speaking countries like the United States. However, as with most cash crops, currants became a wealth and a curse. It injected large sums of money into the local economy which made certain classes, capable of exploiting emerging credit structures, very wealthy which did not always coincide with a change in status. This led to societal tension. In addition, currant production and trade made Zakynthos and Cephalonia almost entirely reliant on one agricultural product making the islands vulnerable to changes in currant prices.

Today, currants are still grown in Zakynthos and were recently recognized as a Protected Designation of Origin (PDO) product by European Union.

=== Sigouros and Soumakis families ===
The rise of the currant product and trade in Zakynthos spurred the growth of several mercantile families, such as the Soumakis and Sigouros, which played a key role in not only local but also international affairs. Some Zakynthian mercantile families had become so prominent in the currant trade, that most Venetians present in England in the last quarter of the sixteenth century were Greek subjects of the Republic, and some of them were Zakynthians. These Zakynthian mercantile families not only contributed to the commercial life of the island as merchants and ship captains but several members of those families became notable Stradioti, poets, chroniclers, diplomats, priests and even a Saint of the Orthodox Church. Their story provides a glimpse into the commercial and political links of elite Zakynthians during the early part of Venetian rule.

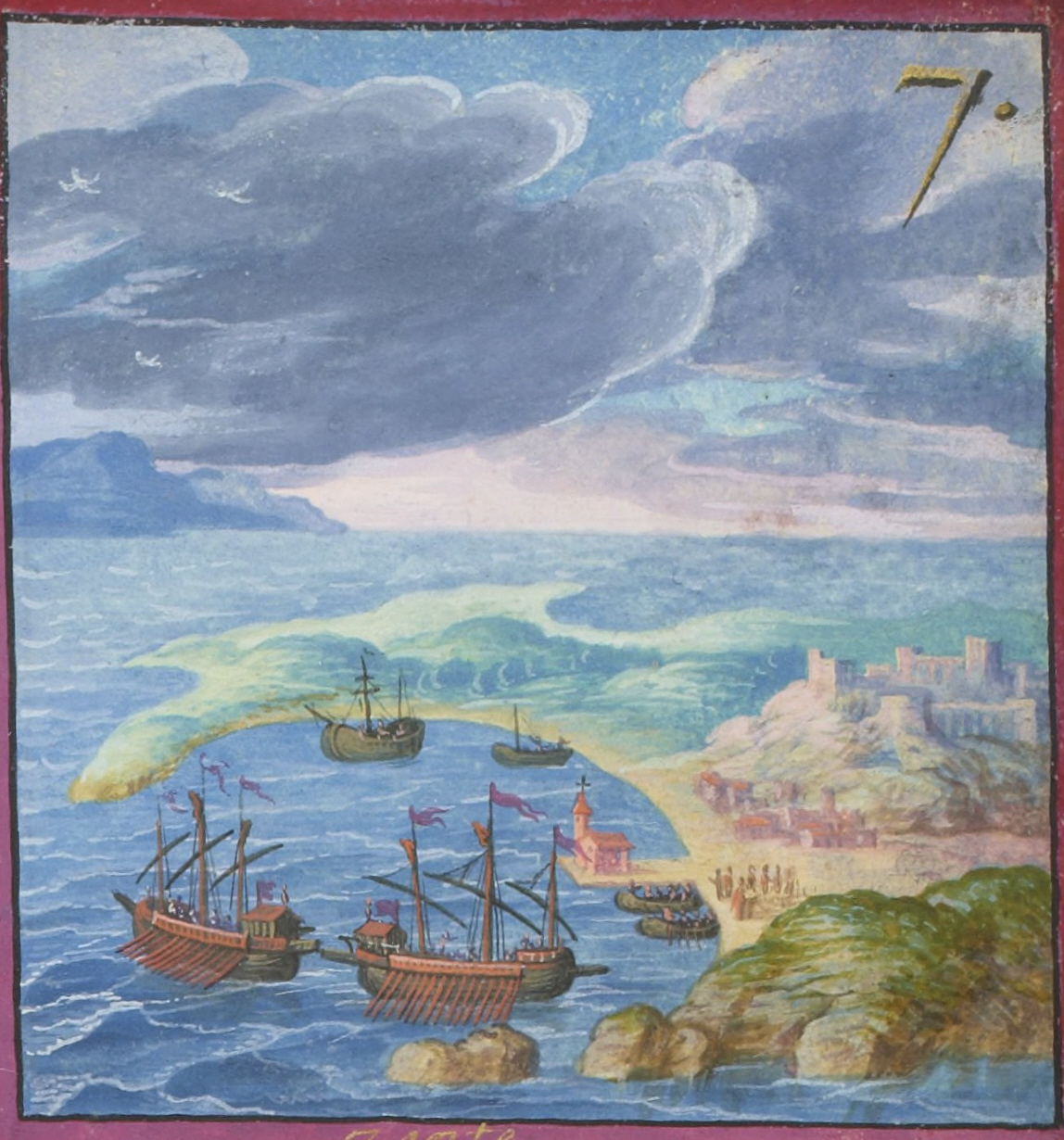
Miniature of Zakynthos port and castle from Carlo Maggi's travelogue known as Codex Maggi drawn by either an unknown Venetian or Flemish master, 1578

The Sigouros family were descendants of the Norman De Segur who had been settled in Zakynthos for many years before the arrival of the Venetians in 1485. At the latest, the family had embraced Orthodoxy before the end of the Tocco family rule. The family escaped the destruction of Zakynthos by the Turks in 1479 and returned a few years later at the beginning of the Venetian rule. They faithfully served the Venetians as Stradioti including service in Italy and Mani, Peloponnese and so was rewarded with Venetian titles as well as inclusion in the Libro d’Oro and managed to regain much of their ancestral land on Zakynthos. They were also allowed to captain warships.

=== Battle of Lepanto (1570–1571) ===
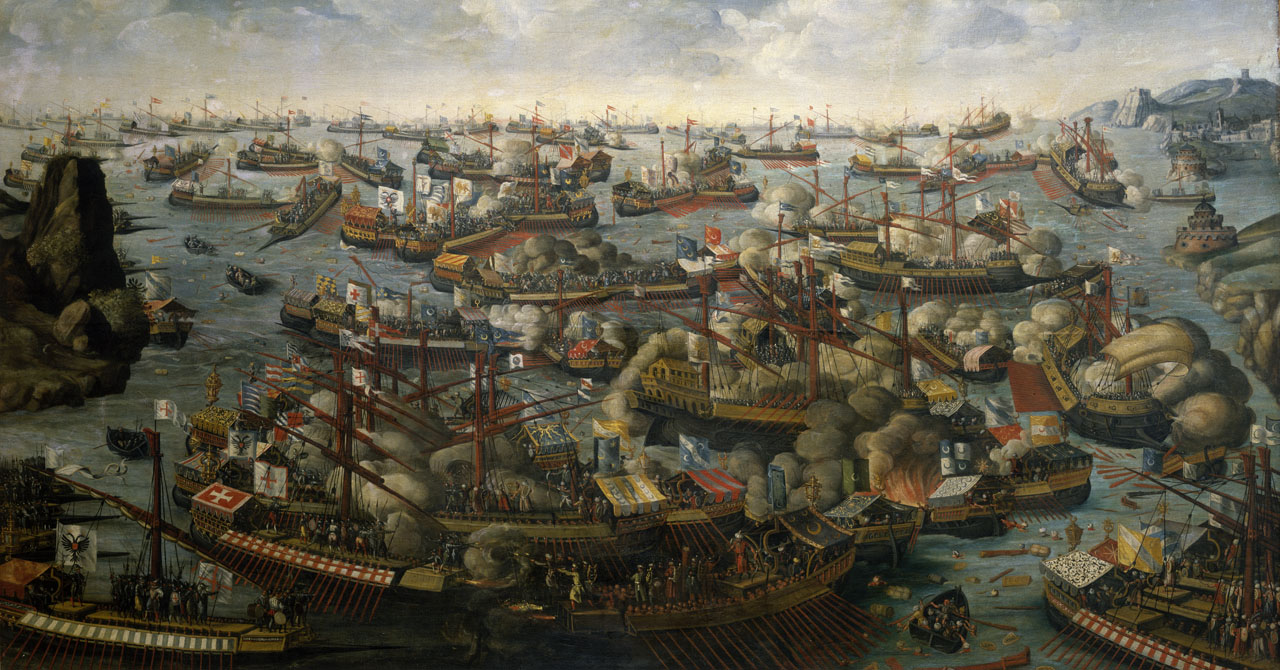
The Battle of Lepanto by an unknown artist

The people of Zakynthos contributed to the famous Battle of Lepanto not only due to the proximity of the battle to the island but also due to the Ottoman raids prior to the battle and the participation of a number of galleys from the island. In early 1570, the provveditore of Zakynthos, Paolo Contarini took active measures for the defense of the island given a new outbreak in the conflict between the Austrians and Ottoman Turks. Throughout spring and early summer of 1571, Ottoman raiders plundered several monasteries around the island but they were met with fierce resistance by local fighters led by George Minotos and Constantine Vlastos. Many Zakynthians found refuge in the Castle. Shortly after, the Ottoman Turks and Barbary pirates raided and sieged the Castle for 30 days but the islanders bravely repelled the attack – the attackers left for neighbouring Cephalonia. After this historic victory, Paolo Contarini invited the leaders to the Government House in the Castle where young nobles performed, for the first recorded time in modern Greek history, Aeschylus's tragedy, The Persians in Italian translation.

In early October 1571, the united naval forces of Venice, Spain and Pope Pius V under the leadership of Don Juan of Austria gave battle against the Ottoman fleet at the entrance of the Patras Gulf in the famous Battle of Lepanto (not at Lepanto as is commonly believed). Along with many Greeks from Crete, Corfu, Naxos and Cyprus (also Greeks in the Ottoman fleet), Zakynthian sailors participated in the battle with six galleys financed, equipped and manned by mostly locals. They were led by Andreas Koutouvali, Nicholas Mondinos, Marinos Sigouros (nephew of St. Dionysios), Nicholas Foskardi, Constantine Vlastos, Dimitris Comoutos and Ioannis Montsenigos.

Residents of the Zakynthos watched the battle from the area of Kryoneri and Voidi island where they apparently could hear the cannon and see the ship's sails. After the victory part of the fleet landed in Zakynthos where residents welcomed them with great enthusiasm.

=== Saint Dionysios ===
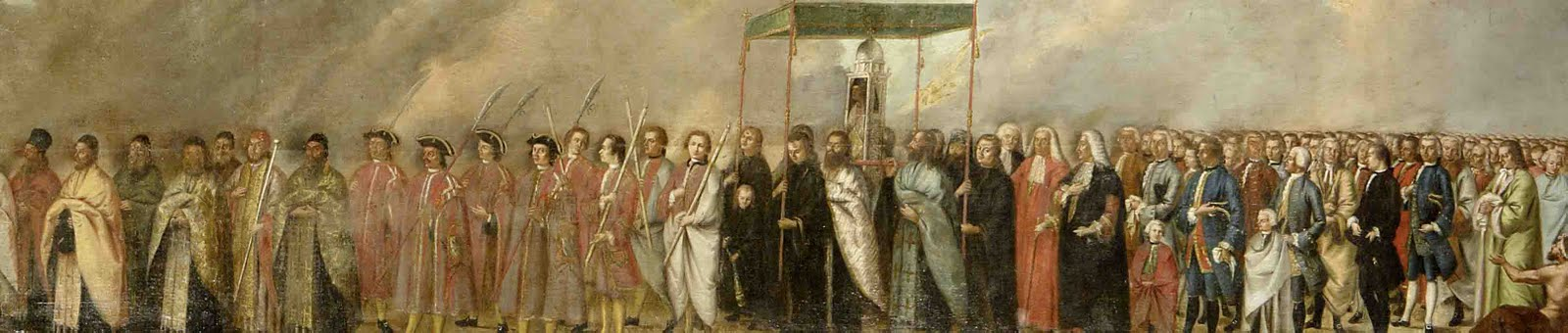
Detail from the Litany of the relic of St Dionysios in Strofades by Nikolaos Koutouzis, 1786

The life of Saint Dionysios of Zakynthos provides a clue as to life during the early period of Venetian rule. Draganigos Sigouros was born in 1547 to a noble family located in the south-east of the island. The family had roots in Venice and the name appears in the Libro D'Oro as they had fought on the side of Venice in the Venetian–Turkish wars. Draganigos was educated by Orthodox priests and became fluent in Greek, Italian, and Latin. He became a monk in 1568 and was given the name Daniel. Two years later he was ordained a deacon and became a priest in 1577. Daniel was raised to Archbishop of Aegina and Poros under the name of Dionysios in 1577; however, shortly after he abdicated and re-settled in Zakynthos as an abbot of the monastery of the Virgin Mary Anafornitria. Not long after he forgave his brother's murderer following a family feud which were common at the time between rich and powerful families of the island, which later led to him being given the epithet of the Saint of Forgiveness. He died in 1622. Dionysios was declared a Saint of the Orthodox Church by the Ecumenical Patriarchate of Constantinople in 1703.

St Dionysios is the patron saint and protector of Zakynthos and his feast day celebrated on December 17 and August 24 where the Church celebrates the transfer of his relics to the island from Strofades.

=== The Mani and Zakynthos ===
Another key source of Zakynthian refugees and influence on Zakynthian culture including its dialect was The Mani in the southern Peloponnese.

After the fall of Constantinople in 1453 and Mystras in 1460 the Mani remained the last free area of the former late Byzantine empire. It became a frequent staging point for rebellion by local Maniots and Stradioti. One of the first major armed insurrections of Stradioti against the Ottoman Empire began in 1463 under the leadership of Krokodilos Kladas and was coincident with the Venetian-Turkish war of 1463–1479. Venice recognised the people from Mani or Maniates as allies in their war against the Ottoman Empire given their military prowess and tactial acumen.

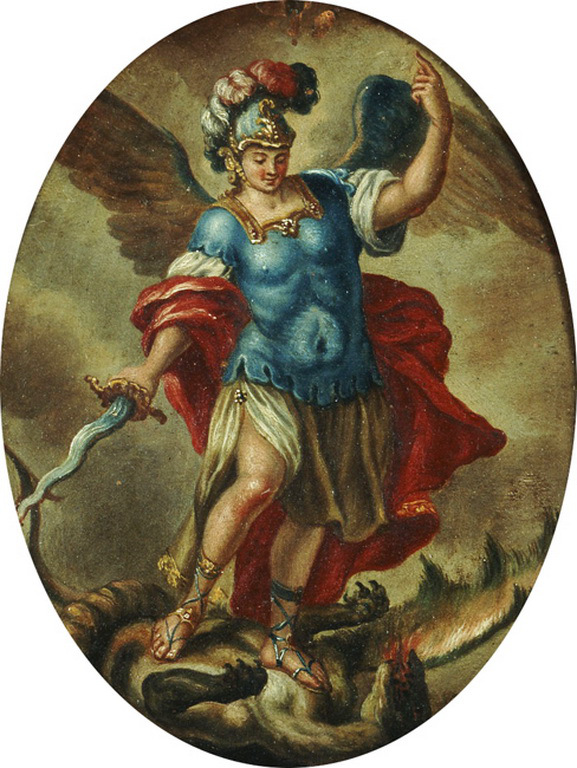
Archangel Michael by Panagiotis Doxaras, c. 1700

After Venice occupied Zakynthos in 1484, it endeavored to re-populate the island with Stradioti and refugees from regions in mainland Greece which it lost to the Ottoman Empire. Given Maniates had fought as allies with Venice against the Ottoman Empire only a few years before, the Maniot Stradioti were one of the sources of Zakynthian settlers. They settled primarily in the coastal area of Aigallon around present-day Zakynthos town and surrounding villages. Prominent families to settle in Zakynthos were Voultsos, Gerakaris, Doxaras, Kontostavlos, Kouroumalos, Koutoufaris, Melissinos, Messalas, Novakos, Samariaris, Skiadopoulos, Stefanopoulos, Someritis and Foukas. Some of these Maniot families were later registered in the Libro d’Oro. A few of these family names are still prominent in Zakynthos today.

After this initial influx, many Maniot families continued to emigrate to Zakynthos following the almost continual conflicts with the Ottoman Turks and pirate raids on their homeland. On 30 August 1670, the provveditore, Pizani wrote that 1500 people emigrated to Zakynthos and more would have arrived had the Ottoman Turks not blocked shipping to the island. This chain of emigration also helped to maintain trade contact between the Mani and Zakynthos. Gradually, the people from Mani assimilated into Zakynthian society but not without influencing Zakynthian culture and its dialect. Not surprisingly, Maniots were also active participants in the Rebellion of the Popolari in 1628. Of the four Procuratori that were elected by the Popolari, one of them was a Maniot, Anastasios Rousos. Of the 28 Popolari that took up arms, five were from Mani. Some scholars even contend that the practice of blood feud was imported to Zakynthos from the Mani.

One of the most interesting early Maniot emigrants was Panagiotis Doxaras, the father of the Heptanese School of Painting. His family migrated to Zakynthos from the Mani shortly after he was born in 1664. Another interesting migrants was the maternal ancestors of Dionysios Solomos's mother, Angelili Niklis.

However, the influence was all one way. During the Morean War (Sixth Venetian-Ottoman War) in 1684, Zakynthian Pavlos Makris led a band of 230 Maniot fighters to relieve the castle of Zarnata in the Mani from an Ottoman garrison that was established after the participation of Maniots in the earlier Cretan War (Fifth Venetian-Ottoman war).

=== Rebellion of the Popolari (1628–1632) ===
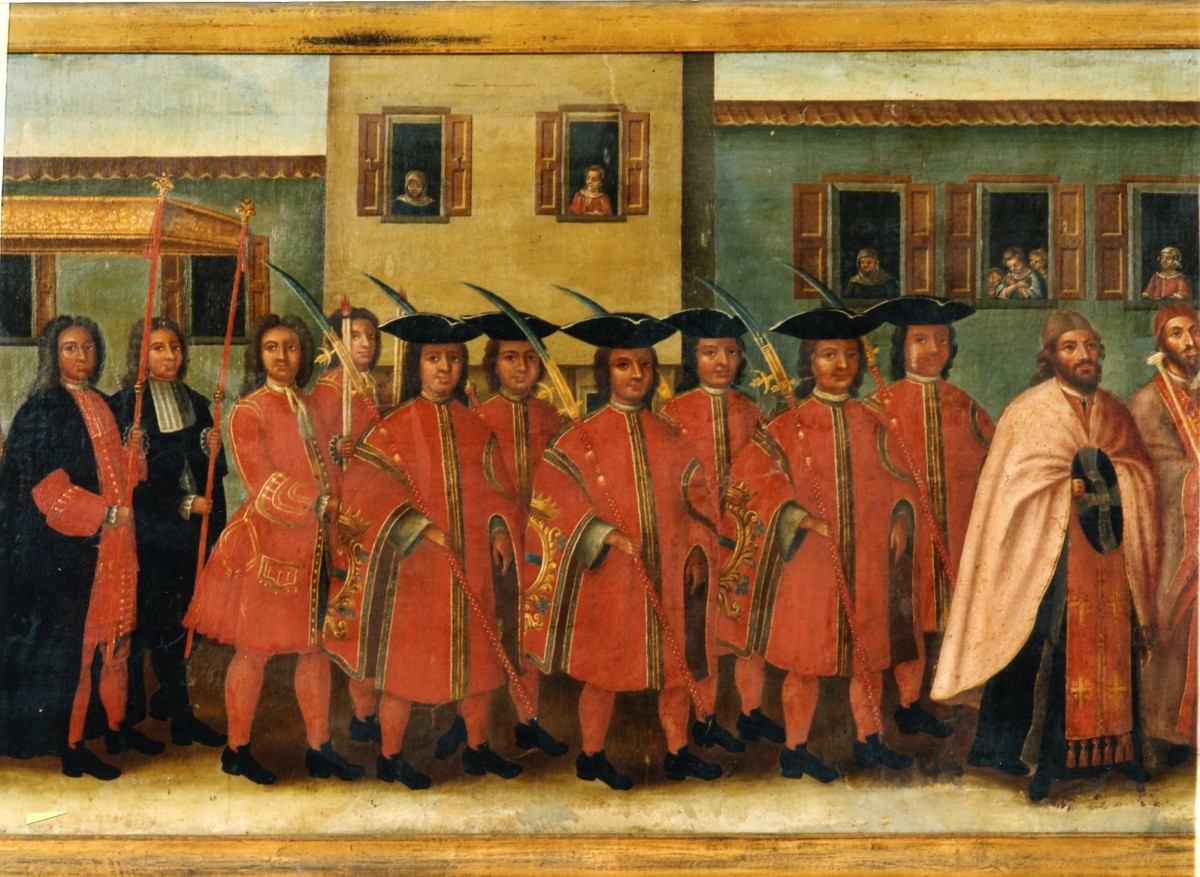
The Litany of St Haralambos, St Haralambos Church near Argassi, Zakynthos showing Zakynthian nobles in procession. Painted by Ioannis Korais, 1756

Venetian rule was anything but peaceful during the period of the occupation. The societal changes and inequalities that developed between the various classes of Zakynthian society: Cittadini or Civili (bourgoise citizens), Popolari (urban lower classes) and the Villani (people of the countryside) resulted in the so-called Rebellion of the Popolari which broke in 1628 and lasted for 4 years.

After the Turkish raids of 1479 and the general neglect of the Tocco family rule, Zakynthos and Cephalonia were underpopulated by the time they became part of the Venetian Republic. Consequently, there was no feudal structures or jurisdictions on both islands. Over time, a steady wave of settlers of Stradioti and refugees arrived and mixed with the relatively small number indigenous inhabitants of the island. The confluence of these factors created a very unusual property situation for the time, characterised by many small and free landowners, which would also be dramatically affected by the currant boom. In addition, the structure of Venetian rule was heavily dependent on local Zakynthians. Given there was no feudal nobility, the Cittadini, members of the local council had political rights and participated in local administration alongside the Venetian Reggimento, had considerable influence. The Popolari had very few political rights. However, in the early years of Venetian rule there was considerable mobility between the Popolari and Cittadini. Gradually, over the course of time the Cittadini attempted to stifle the entry of Popolari into the local governance structures by attempting to close the communal council by adopting the institution of the Small Council of 150 and also by cleaning up the General Council. With the influx of cash from the boom in currant production and trade, discontent increased among some of the newly wealthy Popolari who in turn sought arouse some of the lower strata of the population to rebel.

Likely, a decision by the Inquisitore Antonio da Ponte in 1623 to change the rosters for night wardens in Zakynthos town by extending these to all Popolari sparked the Rebellion of the Popolari. The leaders of the Popolari interpreted this as an abuse of power by the Cittadini and a formal codification of the Popolari's inferiority as the Cittadini could easily manipulate the wardenships. Therefore, the conflict was primarily between the Cittadini and the Popolari classes. Although, the Cittadini were not entirely Venetian, the dissatisfaction of the Popolari was directed towards the Cittadini as representatives of Venetian rule.

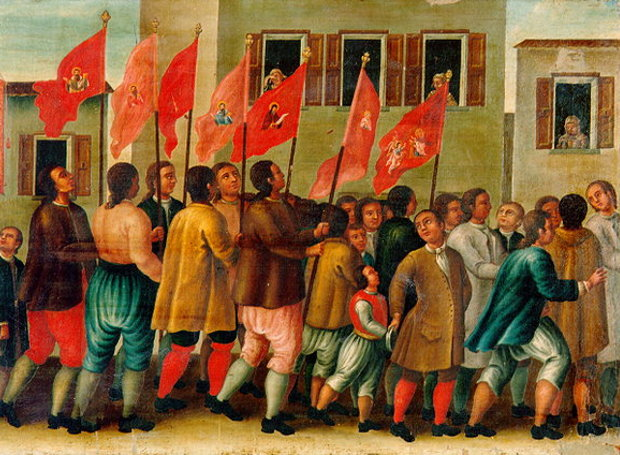
The Litany of St Haralambos, St Haralambos Church near Argassi, Zakynthos showing Zakynthian Cittadini in procession. Painted by Ioannis Korais, 1756

The situation remained at a stalemate until May 1628. Then the Popolari decided to elect four Procuratori as their representatives and one Avvocato of the people. They also elected four ambassadors to go to Venice to plead directly to the Senate. The Rettore accepted these elections to keep the peace. The following August, the Capitano dell'Armata, Antonio Civran brought matters to a head by demanding that everyone sign up on the new rosters. No one did. He arrested the four Procuratori. The population rose up in arms, the flag of St Mark was insulted, Cittadini homes were threatened with fire and the galley of the Capitano was shot at. Calm was brought about by intermediation by the local Orthodox clergy, high ranking Venetians and even the English merchants stationed in Zakynthos. For the next three years the Procuratori were made part of the council, but in June 1631 the Inquisitore Antonio Pisani arrived and started a trial that lasted until February 1632. The sentences for the rebels was extremely severe but a few years later there was a general pardon.

By and large, the rich Popolari did not want to overthrow Venetian rule as is commonly thought. Neither did they want to abolish the social hierarchy. Their demands were simply so they could rise within the social hierarchy. Ultimately, they were not successful. In 1683, marked the strict closure of the Communal Council by restricting its membership to 93 families and took on the unofficial title of Nobles. However, the Popolari were to get their revenge a little more than 100 years later.

Importantly, the Rebellion of the Popolari was documented in a chronicle by Angelos Soumakis who was present during the events. He was a member of the Cittadini. The Rebellion of the Popolari is often considered the first social revolt on Greek territory in modern history.

=== Pirates and Corsairs ===
Zakynthos was considered a relatively wealthy island throughout the period of the Venetian occupation, so pirates and corsairs presented a constant threat, compelling Zakynthians to remain vigilant. So much so they developed a relatively sophisticated early warning system using special guards, fires and guardhouses which some survive to this day. However, despite suffering from pirate attacks some Zakynthians also became well-known pirates or corsairs. Although the island was never known as a den of pirates like Mani, Peloponnese or Sfakia, Crete.

Given commerce and trade was the primary concern of the Venetian Republic; particularly, with the Ottoman Empire, they severely condoned corsairs and pirates operating in the eastern Mediterranean. However, they did vary their policy depending on whether they were at war with the Ottoman Empire. For example, the combined Christian fleet which also included many Venetian galleys that fought at the Battle of Lepanto in 1571 employed Greek sailors who were previously partaking in piracy against the Ottoman Empire. After 1571, with the Ottoman fleet in disarray after Lepanto, many of these Greek pirates continued their activities with relative immunity. Even Christian corsairs from elsewhere in Europe flocked to the Eastern Mediterranean after 1571. It is reported that many of these corsairs, such as those funded by the Grand Duchy of Tuscany, were welcomed in Zakynthos because many of the sailors that served on these ships were Ionian Islanders themselves. During other periods of Venetian-Ottoman conflict, the Venetians urged the Ionian Islanders to conduct espionage and piracy. They not only provided them with protection certificates but sometimes even ships. Of course, after the cessation of fighting it was difficult to control the piratical activities of the Ionian Islanders.

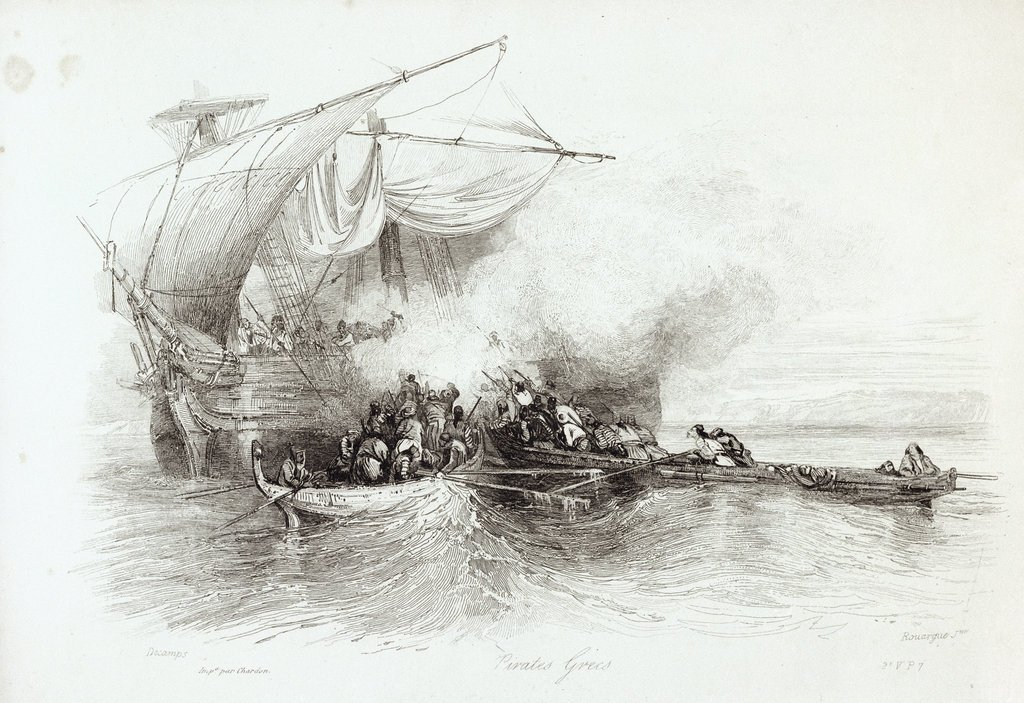
Greek Pirates by Alexandre Gabriel Decamps, 1838

One of the most well-known Greek pirates was Zakynthian, Eustathios Romanos or perhaps better known as Manetas. He was active primarily between 1678 and 1684 based around the well-known pirate lair of the Aegean island of Milos. Supposedly, he amassed enormous wealth and owned seven galleys with cannons and a large crew. After the outbreak of the Morean War, he joined the forces of Morisini and became a corsair for the Venetians. During the campaign to conquer Preveza by Venice and her allies, Romanos sailed east and captured Arta. For his later services in helping to conquer Chios, he was awarded the title of Colonel by the Venetian Republic. He was also involved in the trade of Turkish slaves. His son, Georgios also continued the occupation of his father and menaced the coasts of Peloponnese, Zakynthos and Kefalonia. He also employed sailors from these regions and islands. Between 1734 and 1735, in the service of the Austrians, Zorzo Manetas and his brother Andreas Romanos and their seven galleys and another boat which they had acquired in Trieste with Austrian funds, manned with Zakynthians, Kefallonites, Ithacisians and Lefkadians, captured 15 French ships in the Ionian and Aegean Seas. Manetas and his brother were arrested by the Venetians and taken to Corfu. However, a year later they were released and departed for Trieste and Vienna. The Greeks as crews of foreign corsairs gained a reputation for their perseverance, austere lifestyle and hard work. In 1757, Panagiotis Dragos, a captain of an English ship from Minorca equipped 24 cannons and 42 men, mainly from Zakynthos and Kefalonia, and attacked and captured a French ship with a cargo of wheat in the port of Volos. In 1759, Zakynthian Konstantine Kalamatas (some scholars claim he was from Patmos), in the service of England made his presence felt on the Peloponnese coast. His crew consisted of 87 Greeks from the Ottoman Empire and Greek subjects of Venice. Based in Kythera he is known to have seized a French ship, where afterwards they led it to Mani and distributed the spoils.

During the latter stages of the Orlov Revolt, ships captained and manned by Ionian Islanders, including the Zakynthian captain, Padouveros took part in the Battle of Cesme with the Russian fleet against the Ottoman navy in 1770. The Ottoman fleet was destroyed. After that Ionian Islanders manned large and small ships and conducted operations as corsairs under the Russian flag. Shortly after, the Treaty of Kucuk Kaynarca of 1774 between the Russian and Ottoman Empires created even more favourable conditions for the Ionian Islanders allowing them to legally retain the privileges which they had attained as corsairs. In addition, many of the ships the Russians abandoned in the eastern Mediterranean were bought by Greek subjects of the Venetian Republic, namely, Ionian Islanders such as Delikostantis from Zakynthos who operated in an area ranging from the Ionian Sea to the area around Kastellorizo.

Lambros Katsonis was a Colonel in the Imperial Russian Navy, combatant in the Second Russian-Turkish War (1787–1792) and widely considered an early hero of the Greek War of Independence. In the 1770s, he assembled a Greek fleet of 70 ships and harassed the Ottoman Navy in the Aegean and Ionian Islands. Although not Zakynthian, his ships employed many sailors from the island. Later in 1788, in the service of the Imperial Russian Navy, he sailed from Trieste with his fleet manned Greek corsairs to Zakynthos. The Venetian Republic tried to restrict his activities given many of his sailors were Venetian subjects. Later, he tried to organise a pan-Hellenic naval campaign to rebel against the Ottoman Empire but he was ultimately not successful.

=== Fall of Crete (1645–1669) and impact on Zakynthos ===
The Fifth Ottoman–Venetian War was fought over the island of Crete, Venice's largest and richest overseas possession. The war lasted from 1645 to 1669 and was fought in Crete and the seas surrounding it. Most of Crete was conquered by the Ottomans in the first few years of the war, but the fortress of Candia (modern Heraklion), the capital of Crete, resisted successfully until 1699. Many Cretans chose to flee rather than submit to the Ottomans, seeking refuge in other parts of Venetian-ruled Greece and Venice itself. The Ionian Islands, primarily Zakynthos and Corfu, and to a lesser extent Kythera acted either as a place of refuge or a stopover towards Venice. The demographics, social structure, spiritual and artistic development of Zakynthos were significantly impacted by the Cretan War.

Zakynthos received its first wave of refugees mainly from the areas of Chania and Rethymno during the early years of the Cretan War. The siege and fall of Candia in 1669 marked the beginning of a new refugee wave which lasted until the early 18th century. The demographic changes were significant. A Venetian official, Antonio Bernardo reported to the Venetian Senate on May 25, 1670, that the island's population increased by 3,500 ‘souls’ from an existing population of around 24,000 people.

A significant proportion of the Cretan refugees to Zakynthos were from the upper social strata of Crete and had either Venetian or Cretan titles of nobility and Cittadini status. The Venetian authorities sought to have these titles recognised where these noble Cretan refugees settled including Zakynthos. Additionally, these refugees sought and joined the Community Council, which created tension and engendered strong reactions by the pre-existing Zakynthian upper social strata. Amongst these noble Cretan refugees were the paternal ancestors of Dionysios Solomos. Most of the Cretan refugees to Zakynthos came from urban Crete and so primarily settled in Zakynthos town, rather than in the countryside. The main settlement in Zakynthos town was at its southern edge. This district, which was known as Neochori or Benardakaiika, existed until it was destroyed by the great earthquake of 1953. Many of the Cretan refugees sought to re-form their guilds in Zakynthos if there were sufficient guild members among the refugees or they joined pre-existing guilds in Zakynthos. This contributed to the preservation of artistic and craft skills from the Cretan Renaissance period to Zakynthos and Corfu and later modern Greece.

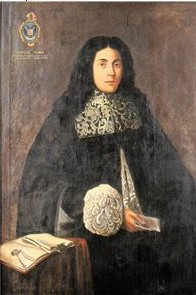
Portrait of Kourtios Romas (father of Moukios) by unknown artist, c. 1620

Many Zakynthians made important contributions to the war effort throughout period of the Cretan War with donations of food, money, munitions for galleys, sailors in the Venetian navy and soldiers in the Venetian land forces in Crete. For example, in 1659, the Community Council of Zakynthos decided to impose a new tax on those who exported wine and currants, at considerable cost to the producers and merchants of the island, in a move aimed at supporting the Venetian Republic in its long struggle against the Ottomans regarding Crete. Pavlos Gaitas, along with his brothers Ioannis, Dimitrios and Antonios, equipped a galley with a crew of local volunteers and took part in naval and land battles during the war. Gaitas's contribution to the war effort was rewarded by the provveditore generale Francesco Morosini in 1660 with his appointment into the Community Council, a move that caused intense reactions from many incumbent members. The Zakynthian Prokopios Martinego armed a galley and maintained a crew of 50 for many years throughout the conflict, including the Siege of Candia. For his service, the Venetian Republic officially recognized him in 1669 as a hero of the Cretan War. Zakynthian Moukas Romas majorly contributed to the war, and also took part in the last organized operation of transporting inhabitants of the city of Candia to the Ionian Islands.

=== Zakynthians in the Morean War (1684–1699) ===
The Morean War (or Sixth Ottoman–Venetian War) was fought between 1684 and 1699. The war's theatre was very large, stretching from Dalmatia to the Aegean Sea, but the major flashpoint was the Morea (Peloponnese) peninsula. The island of Zakynthos did not experience the war on its soil but like most of Venice's wars, Zakynthians fought on the side of Venice and Zakynthians held a number of leadership positions.

In 1684, when the Venetian commander-in-chief Francesco Morosini assembled his forces, around 2000 Ionian Islands soldiers were recruited. There were six galleys from the Ionian islands of which three were from Zakynthos, captained by Agiselaos Sigouros, Nikolaos Logothetis and Constantinos Minotos. Eustathios Logothetis financed his own body of 150 Zakynthian soldiers, and Angelo De Negris from Zakynthos offered his services to Venice. In the meantime, the Venetians had sent the Zakynthian leaders, Pavlos Makris and Panagiotis Doxaras to the Mani Peninsula to ferment revolt. During the 1684 Siege of Santa Maura, Zakynthian troops under Nikolaos Komoutos, Angelos De Negri and Ioannis Koutouvelis participated. The latter had armed his own galley of 80 men. The Venetians then crossed onto mainland Greece and captured several towns.

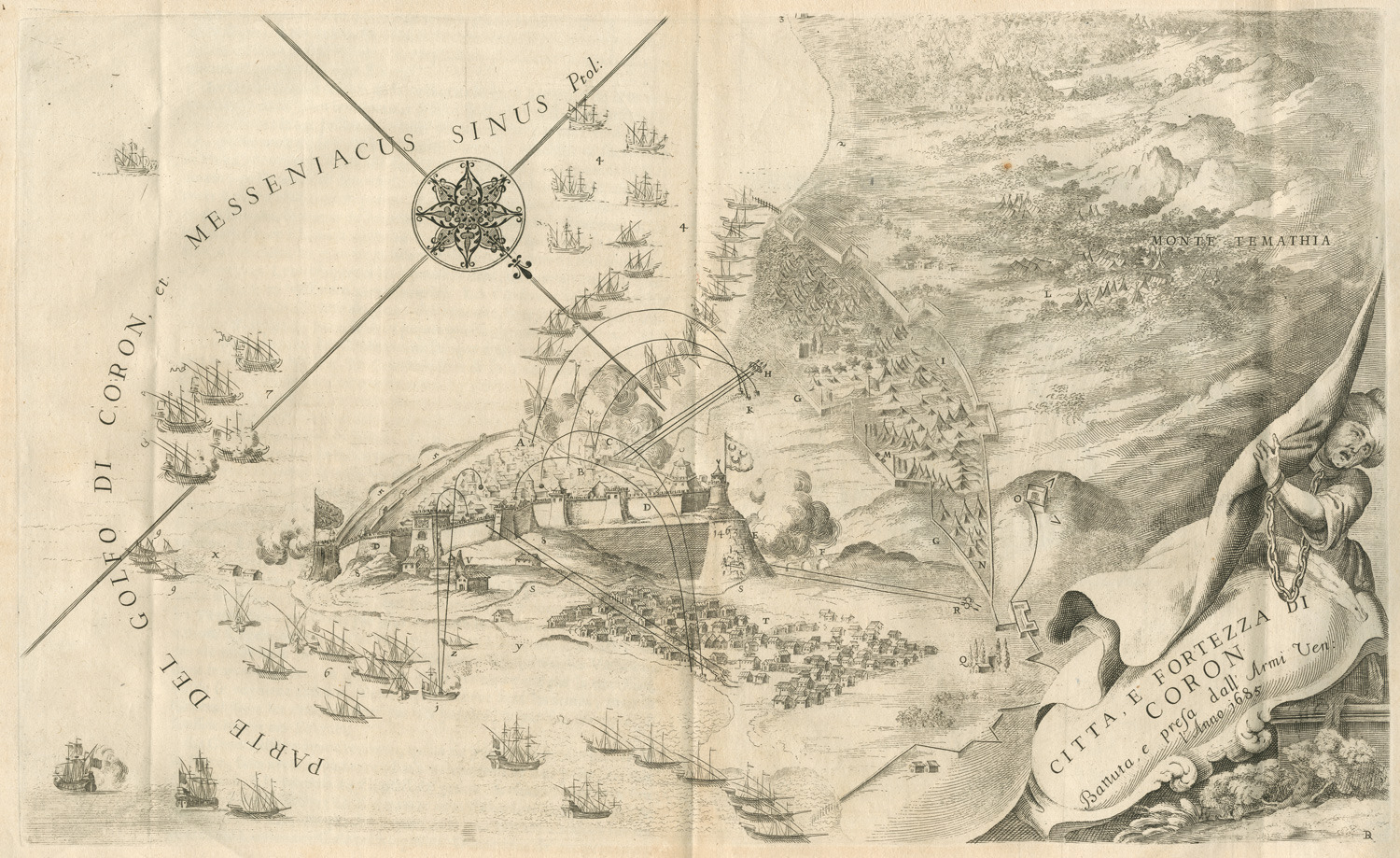
The siege of Koroni by Vincenzo Coronelli, 1688

Zakynthian noble Pavlos Makris led a force of 230 Maniots during the Siege of Coron (1685), and became the nucleus of a larger force that captured the castles of Zarnata, Kelefa, and Passavas. In 1687, Morosini instituted a blockade of the northern coast of the Morea, in which the Zakynthians Francisco and Stathis Vlastos, as well as Agisilaos Sigouros, took part. Other Zakynthian volunteers joined the land campaign of 1687, and fought at the Battle of Patras and the Siege of the Acropolis. These included Nikolaos Foskardis, Spyridon and Konstantinos Naratzis and Anastasios and Antonios Kapsokefalos and Konstantinos Kapnisis.

=== Plague, pestilence and famine ===
Following the fall of various Venetian-occupied cities and forts in mainland Greece and the fall of Crete in 1669, Zakynthos became a key port for Venetian trade from and towards the Levant and Constantinople – where the Ottoman authorities lagged western Europe in disease prevention and control. Additionally, Zakynthos was only a short distance from the Peloponnese where again the Ottoman authorities were lax in enacting policies to prevent disease and building appropriate infrastructure to improve sanitary conditions and the health of the inhabitants of the area. Consequently, many merchants and sailors entered and exited the port of Zakynthos from Ottoman controlled ports – these merchants and sailors were sometimes unwilling to undergo the increasingly strict measures Zakynthos enacted to avoid plague, pestilence, cholera and other disease outbreaks. Therefore, the people of Zakynthos were at significant risk of being impacted by the plague, pestilence and other disease epidemics.

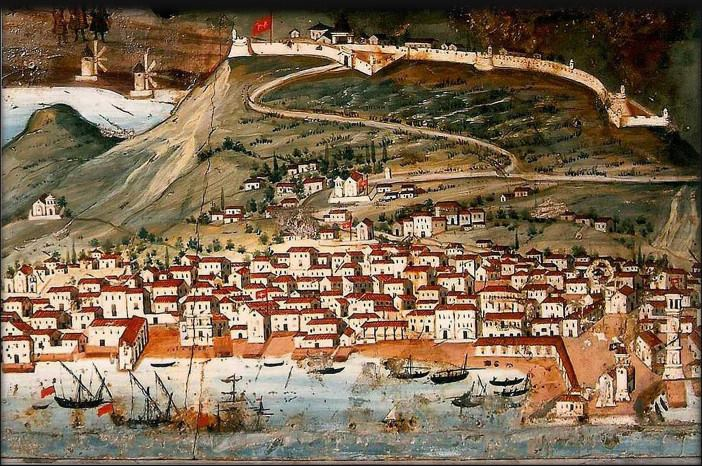
Zakynthos town as depicted in icon of Agios Haralambos wiping out the plague by Nikolaos Kalergis, 1732

Zakynthos did suffer from serious outbreaks of the plague in 1617, 1646, 1692 and 1728 and also smallpox in 1713, 1748 and 1778. One of the most famous victims of the 1728 plague was the painter and sometime doctor, Hieronymous Plakotos. He and his son died in his doctor's clinic and the local authorities decided to burn it, including his paintings, fearing a further outbreak. From the beginning of the 18th century the sanitary measures taken by the Venetian authorities and enacted by local Cittadini such as strict control of population movements and quarantine, improved lazarettos, better trained public health offices and coastal garrisons, reduced the incidences of outbreaks in the 18th century.

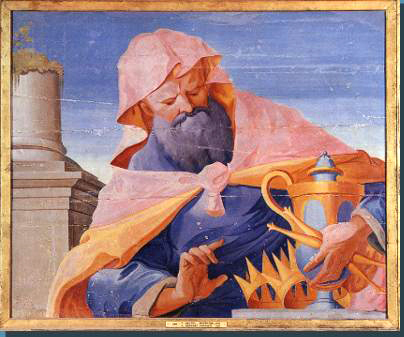
One of the Prophets from Panagia Faniromeni Church, Zakynthos town believed to be originally by Heironymous Plakotos but repainted by Nikolaos Doxaras, c. 1750s

The increasing reliance by Zakynthians on currant production and trade for income given the outsized profits available to farmers and merchants compared to other crops and the resultant rising dependence on grain imports from the Peloponnese increased the risk of famine over time despite the island being capable of self-sufficiency in grain and other basic food crops. These risks were particularly heightened during the often frequent periods of conflict between the Venetian Republic and the Ottoman Empire when access to grain from the Peloponnese was restricted. Zakynthos suffered from serious famine in 1523 and 1687.

Despite the wealth generated by the arable land, favourable climate and geographic position of Zakynthos – and the frequent immigration from other areas of the Greek mainland and Crete – the frequent outbreaks of plague, pestilence, disease and famine during the Venetian occupation had deleterious impacts on the demographic and economic growth of the island.

=== Second Morean War (1714–1718) ===
The Seventh Venetian-Ottoman War was fought between the Republic of Venice and the Ottoman Empire between 1714 and 1718. It ended with an Ottoman victory and the loss of the Venetian Republic's last major possession in the Greek peninsula of the Morea (the Peloponnese). This was the final war between these two powers. Again, there was little activity on Zakynthian soil; however, there was naval activity directly offshore and the island acted as an embarkation point for some of the Zakynthian and foreign sailors and soldiers that participated in the siege of Corfu. Like most of Venice's wars, Zakynthians fought on the side of Venice and Zakynthians held key leadership positions; particularly, during the siege of Corfu in 1716.

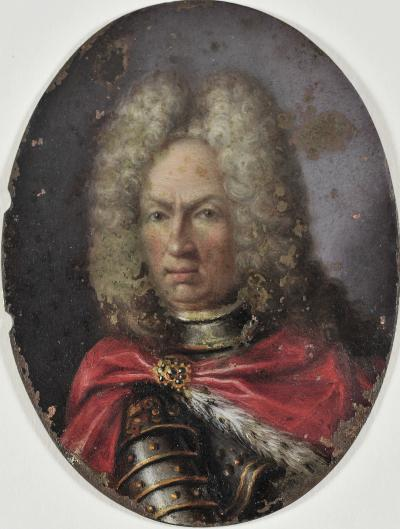
Portrait of Matthias von der Schulenburg, Panagiotis Doxaras, 1719

After the First Morean War, the Ottomans were determined to reverse these losses; especially the Morea. Venice only had a few thousand troops in the whole of the peninsula and they were plagued by supply, disciplinary and morale problems. The local population was also less than friendly. The seizure of an Ottoman ship carrying the treasures of the former Grand Vizier as well as the Venetians granting of sanctuary to the Prince-Bishop of Montenegro, after he had launched an abortive revolt against the Ottomans provided the pretext. On 9 December 1714, the Ottoman Empire declared war on Venice.

In early 1715, the Ottomans assembled an army of around 70,000 men in Macedonia and marched south towards Thebes while an Ottoman fleet numbering 80 warships swiftly captured the last Venetian island possessions in the Aegean. The Venetians relied mainly on mercenaries and could only muster 8,000 men and 42 mostly small ships under the command of the Captain General Daniel Delfin. This force was not only insufficient to meet the Ottoman army in the field, but also inadequate to man the many fortifications in the Morea. Within one hundred days, the entire Peloponnese had been re-taken by the Ottomans.

The Ottomans then decided to move against the Venetian-held Ionian Islands. They swiftly occupied Lefkada. On 8 July 1716, a 33,000 Ottoman army landed on Corfu, the most important of the Ionian islands for the Venetians. Despite an indecisive naval battle, the Ottoman land army continued its disembark and advance towards the city of Corfu. On 19 July, after capturing the outlying forts the siege began. Led by Count Johann Matthias von der Schulenburg, the defence had roughly 8,000 men. Among them were over 400 Zakynthians led by Frangiskos Romas and assisted by Nikolaos Kapsokefalos and the brothers Eustathios and Nikolaos Logothetis. The strong fortifications and the determination of the defenders withstood several assaults. After a great storm on 9 August caused significant casualties among the besiegers, the siege was broken off on 11 August and the last Ottoman forces withdrew on 20 August. For his efforts in helping to defend the city of Corfu from the Ottoman Turks, the Zakynthian leader, Frangiskos Romas was bestowed honours by the Venetian Republic in 1723.

Shortly after, Pope Clement XI committed to providing financial support and France guaranteed Austrian possessions in Italy. Consequently, Austria intervened and on 13 April 1716, renewing their alliance with Venice. In response, the Ottomans declared war on Austria. The Austrian threat forced the Ottomans to direct their forces away from the Morea; however, Venice was too weak to mount any large-scale counter-attack. With the Austrian victories in the Balkans the Ottomans were forced to sign the Treaty of Passarowitz. Although the Ottomans lost significant territories to Austria, they maintained their conquests against Venice in the Peloponnese except for Preveza.

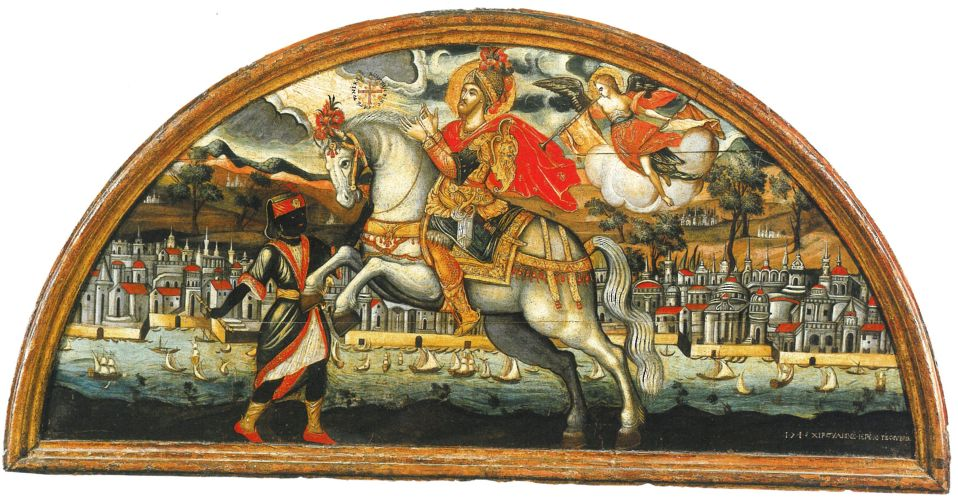
The Vision of St Constantine in St Spyridon, Zakynthos by Stylianos Stavrakis c. 1756

=== Orlov Revolt (1770–1771) ===
The Orlov Revolt was a Greek uprising primarily centred in the Peloponnese. It erupted in 1770 following the arrival of the Russian Admiral Alexey Orlov, commander of the Imperial Russian Navy during the Russo-Turkish War (1768–1774) to Mani. The revolt was a major precursor to the Greek War of Independence and was part of Catherine the Great's so-called Greek Plan. Eventually, it was suppressed by the Ottoman Empire. Many Ionian Islanders participated in this war including Zakynthians; however, none of the war was fought on Zakynthian soil. Increasingly, the participation of Zakynthians (who were effectively Venetian subjects) in wars outside of Zakynthos took on a national character which went against the wishes of the Venetian rulers and often resulted in reprisals. In fact, Venice in accordance with their purported neutrality did their best to reduce the participation of Zakynthians in the Orlov Revolt and made overtures of peace to the Sultan of the Ottoman Empire.

Following a long period of peace, in 1768, the Ottoman Empire declared war on Russia in response to supposed aggressive Russian foreign policy and interference in Crimea, an Ottoman vassal at the time. Hoping to weaken the Ottoman Empire and establish a pro-Russian independent Greek state, Russian emissaries had been sent to Mani in the mid-1760s to make a pact with the strongest local military leaders. At the same time, notable Greeks approached various Russian agents discussing the project for the liberation of Greece. In preparation of war, Russian agents promoted Greek rebellion to support military actions in the north. Several Greeks serving in the Russian army were either sent to Mani or worked with other Russian officers to ferment insurrection in the Morea. The organization of the Greek rebellion was put under the command of the brothers Alexei and Grigroy Orlov. In return for the supply of men and arms, the Greek rebels expected massive Russian aid of around 10,000 soldiers and military equipment. Another Orlov brother, Fyodor was sent to coordinate rebels in Morea which was considered the most important strategic area in mainland Greece given some of its important ports. The eventual expeditionary force of four ships, a few hundred soldiers and inadequate arms supplies greatly disappointed the Greeks. Nevertheless, combined Russian-Greek forces attempted a campaign, with the establishment of local armed groups in Mani and Kalamata. Mutual distrust developed between the Greek and Russian leaders. Initially an army of 1,400 men was formed but additional reinforcements from Crete arrived shortly after.

In the meantime, many Zakynthians and Kefalonians had crossed over to the Morea. The Zakynthian Captain Palikoukias of the ship Atta furnished with 20 cannon and a paid crew of 80 sailors had lowered the flag of St Mark of Venice and raised the Russian flag. The Zakynthians also chartered two ships and disembarked Lechena, around Gastouni. The Venetian provveditores of the islands expressed alarm at the fanaticism of the locals for the Orlov Revolt to his superiors in Venice. By March, the Greek rebels were initially successful and managed to defeat Ottoman forces in Laconia and eastern Messenia in southern Morea. In the north-west of the Morea in Elis, Zakynthian and Kefalonians managed to control the area after a force of around 2,000 Zakynthians led by Vassilieos Makris, Nikolaos Fourtounis, Xanthopoulos and Thrakiotis sieged Pyrgos and then conquered Gastouni and most of Elis. They set up a government administration along similar lines as the Venetian Republic. Nikoalsos Fourtounis was appointed provveditore of Pyrgos and Gastouni. Along with a Kefalonian force, the Zakynthians the besieged Patras. The siege last 20 days until the reinforcement of Turk-Albanians arrived. In response, many of the Zakynthians and Kefalonians left the area including Gastouni. When they returned to Zakynthos and Kefalonia many requested a pardon from the authorities as their participation in the Orlov Revolt was considered a crime. Following pressure from the Ottomans, Venice attempted to pursue the Zakynthian and Kefalonian leaders. The leader, Vassileios Makris escaped punishment but was pursued later in 1776 for his leadership of the Zakynythian force in the siege of Patras. However, the case against Makris and others like Nikolaos Fourtounis was finally heard in 1781 and they were eventually pardoned.

The broader Orlov Revolt however failed to effectively spread – the fortresses of Navarino, Methone and the administrative center of the Morea, Tripolitsa (modern Tripoli) remained under Ottoman control. Meanwhile, a Greek revolt started in Crete. However, again the support promised by the Russian emissaries never arrived and the Cretan leaders were left to his own devices. They managed to organize a band of 2,000 well armed men who descended from the mountains onto the plains of western Crete. The Cretan uprising was soon suppressed by the numerically superior Ottoman army. With the assistance of Greek islanders, the Russian fleet scored a major victory against the Ottoman navy in the Battle of Cesme but this did not help the Greek army in Morea. A Zakynthian ship under the command of Padouveros participated in this battle. The revolt was soon crushed. The Ottoman Empire hired Albanian mercenary troops and they defeated the Russo-Greek expedition at Tripolitsa. Ultimately, the Orlov Revolt was a failure which cost a huge number of lives. The Greeks were effectively forgotten in the Treaty of Kuchuk-Kainarji that followed the cessation of hostilities between the Ottoman and Russian Empires. Consequently, they became increasingly distrustful of the Russians as a result. However, some connections to Russia remained strong in part because of the influence of prominent Greeks in Russia such as Count Mocenigo of Zakynthos who served as Russian Ambassador in Tuscany.

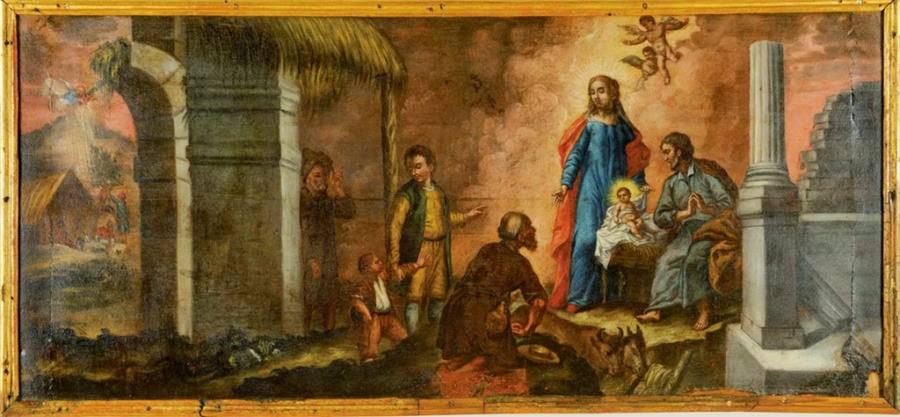
The Adoration of the Shepherds, Nikolaos Koutouzis, c. 1780

=== Freemasonry in Zakynthos ===
Although it is difficult to entirely document the fullest extent of Freemasonry's influence, due to its historical secrecy, it is generally believed to have played a critical role in fostering the sentiments of national liberation among Greeks – ultimately leading to the Greek War of Independence. Given its proximity to western Europe, and the substantial number of Ionian Islanders studying in northern Italy, Freemasonry first flourished in the Ionian Islands.

The first official lodges were created in the eastern Mediterranean by the Scotsman and British consul, Alexander Drummond. He was appointed consul of Britain in Aleppo, Syria in 1744 while at the same time he was authorized by the Grand Lodge of Scotland to found lodges in the eastern Mediterranean. During his long journey to Aleppo to take up his duties, he passed through various Greek islands including Zakynthos. Significantly, in Zakynthos he detected pre-existing knowledge and perhaps even unofficial practice of Freemasonry. According to his diary entries published as, Travels through Different Cities of Germany, Italy, Greece and Several Parts of Asia, he discussed Freemasonry, philosophy, and science with local Zakynthian notables such as the doctor, Nikolaos Athineos and the priest, Antonios Katiforos. Katiforos was probably exposed to Freemasonry during his stay in northern Europe. During their conversations Katiforos tellingly claimed to have written a paper against the Papal Bull In eminenti issued by Clement XII in 1738, where he wrote, ‘using common sense he ridiculed himself as [the Pope] deserved, excommunicating the Freemasons without knowing anything about Freemasonry’. Drummond's hosts also they declared enthusiasm for Freemasonry and expressed their wish to establish a lodge in Zakynthos. However, there is no evidence in the archives of the Grand Lodge of Scotland and of Drummond's that its foundation took place. Regardless, this encounter on Zakynthos clearly demonstrates that some Zakynthians were positively disposed to Freemasonry at this early stage. Around 30 years later, the Venetian authorities were informed that Zakynthian students at the University of Padua were attempting to establish a lodge in Zakynthos. This implies that Zakynthians were already initiated in lodges in northern Italy.

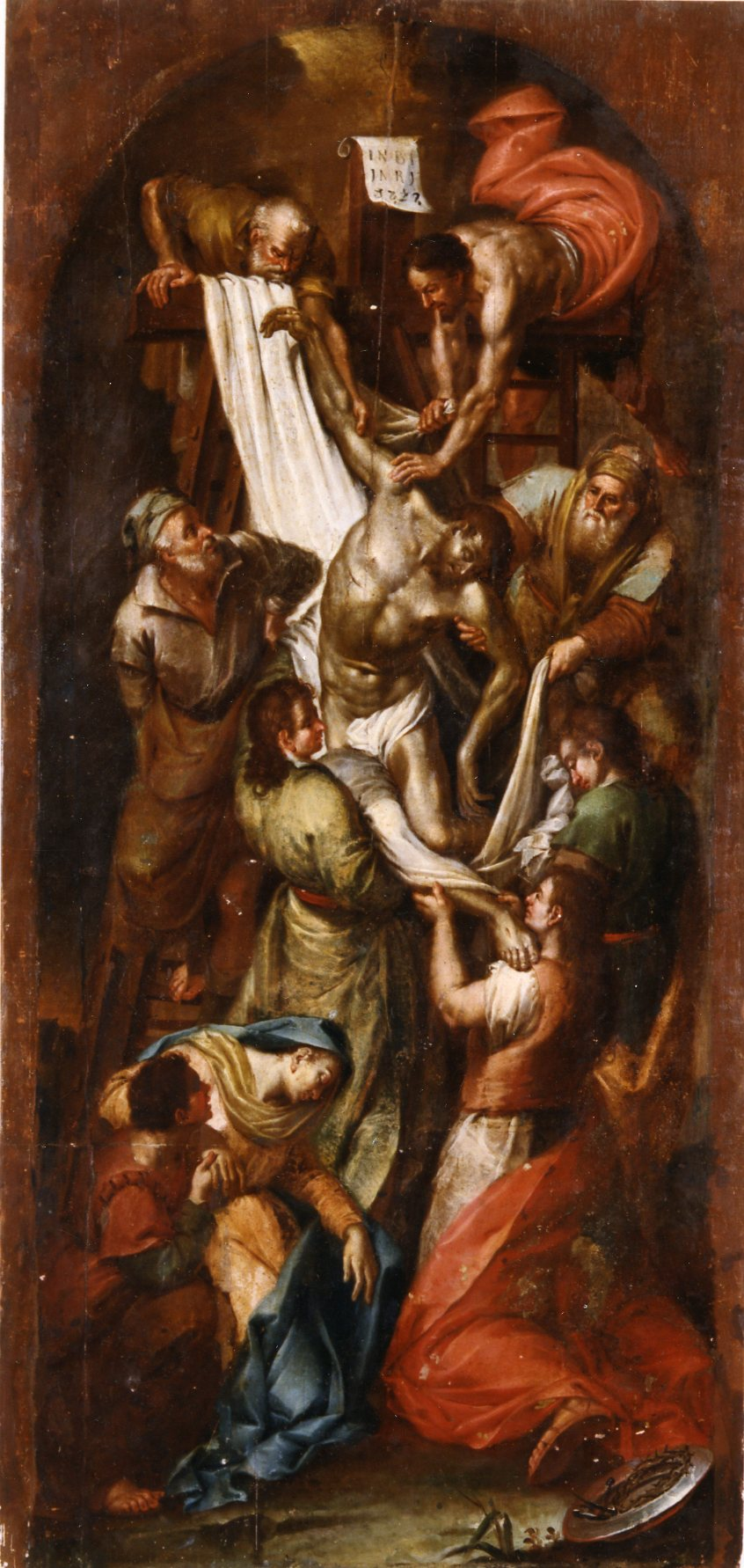
The Descent from the Cross, Nikolaos Koutouzis, c. 1790

The first lodge in Greece is considered to have been created in 1782 in Corfu under the name of Beneficenza; however, there is evidence the lodge functioned irregularly since at least 1771. The lodge was under the direction of the Grand Lodge of Verona, based in Padua, Italy. Although, this lodge would close and re-open again with the arrival of the French, other lodges were also opened in the early 1800s in Corfu. Soon Freemasons would spread the organizational structure of Freemasonry all around the Greek diaspora in Europe and other Greek islands such as Zakynthos.

At least from 1810, there operated two lodges in Zakynthos. Surprisingly, there is no evidence the first lodge was under the authority of a superior authority. By spring 1815, the Zakynthian Dionysios Romas, established the first official lodge in Zakynthos called Renaissance Phoenix established under its parent lodge in Corfu. Members included figures which played, and would continue to play, a critical role in events over the next few years such as Dionysios Romas, Konstantinos Dragonas, Panagiotis Stefanou, Dionysios Flambouriaris and Ioannis Martinengos. Many of these people also became members of the Filiki Etairia and would go on to contribute to the Greek War of Independence. In 1816, the lodges of Corfu and Zakynthos established the first Grand Lodge in what would become Greece, the Grand Anatolian Lodge of Hellas.

The Renaissance Phoenix, under the leadership of Romas, Dragonas, Stefanou, and later Giorgios Tertsetis and Antonios DeRossis, and many others were instrumental in establishing many important civil associations and organisations many of which continue until today such as the Philharmonic Association, the Philodramatic Association, Theatre Foskolos, Medical Society of Zakynthos and club, The Zakynthos. This lodge would endure under until 1848.

Other lodges would be established over time which would include other prominent Zakynthian members such as Alexandros Romas. Today, two lodges operate in Zakynthos, the Astir of the East and Helios.

== French Republican rule (1797–1799) ==
By the time of the French Revolution, the Republic of Venice was already in serious decline given the opening of new sea routes outside of the Mediterranean and the loss of many territories in the eastern Mediterranean. Even in areas under Venetian occupation like the Ionian Islands, there was widespread discontent given heavy and unequal taxation and aristocratic form of governance and control. Consequently, the European Enlightenment; and specifically, the ideas of the French Revolution and the Modern Greek Enlightenment found fertile ground in places like Zakynthos. These ideas were often transmitted by the sons of Nobles and Cittadini who had studied primarily in Italy and/or by foreign agents stationed in on the island. Many of these ideas were also propagated by newly formed political associations constituted by people from all classes of Zakynthian society, which were influenced by Freemasonry and Carbonarism, and resembling the Jacobins in France. In addition, the patriotic poems of Antonios Martelaos and Thomas Danelakis, the patriotic hymn O Thourios of Rigas Ferraios, and the La Marsellaise and Carmagnole translated into Greek are said to have been very popular in the taverns, salons and streets of Zakynthos during this period. The Zakynthians enamoured and increasingly active in realising these ideas were called Patriots. However, reactionary forces often led by the Nobili also began to mobilise to counter the so-called Zakynthian Patriots.

=== Conspiracy to massacre the Patriots (1796) ===
Many of the Zakynthian patriotic revolutionaries coalesced around the figure of the French consul, Constantine-Yakynthis Guys. The consulate was also the source of much Jacobin propaganda spread around Zakynthos town and the rest of the island. Probably due to fear engendered by reactionary forces on the island, on 20 October 1796 the French consulate was set on fire and the blame was laid at the hands of the Venetian authorities for inflaming some of the locals to resist the messages of the French Revolution. The local Nobili requested the Venetian regimento to deal with the Zakynthian Patriots but the Venetians authorities of the island were largely powerless against the growing revolutionary tide and the emerging geopolitical situation in the Ionian Islands and northern Italy instigated by the military victories of Napoleon. In response, the Nobili who had obstinately rejected the new ideas of the French Revolution and the Modern Greek Enlightenment, took matters into their own hands and organised a council at the palazzo of Dimitrios Comoutos. One of the leaders, Draganigos Makris proposed local hoodlums and gangs massacre leadership of the Zakynthian Patriots during the litany of All-Saints. Although, it is documented that this plan had the support of most of the Nobili, it was shrewdly rejected by Dimitrios Comoutos for fear it would incite the French to occupy the island.

Later, after the French did arrive to occupy Zakynthos, and the French General Antoine Gentilli visited the island shortly after in late 1797. During his discussions with the local authorities of the time, he learnt from Guys about the conspiracy by the Nobili to slaughter the Zakynthian Patriots. He was so angered by this that he decided to gather all the Nobili and exile them in distant French Guiana. Before it could be implemented, the Nobili heard about Gentili's decision and quickly raised money to ostensibly support the French troops and democracy. By this action, they spared themselves the trip to South America.

=== Burning of the Libro D'Oro (1797) ===
The Treaty of Campoformio signed in October 1797 dismantled the Venetian Republic and awarded the Ionian Islands to France. Gentili and his French expeditionary force of 1500 Frenchmen, 600 Venetians and boats captured in Venice, and took control of the Ionian Islands a few months before on 26 June 1797 and rapidly formed French provinces of Greece. Zakynthos was made part of the French department Mer-Égée.

Initially, there was strong domestic enthusiasm for the French in Zakynthos. A group of armed men led by Spyro Psimaris took down the flag of St Mark from the castle before the arrival of French troops and the French consul, Guys managed to form a guard before the arrival of Gentili's troops. Most of the locals were relieved to be rid of the Venetians and were hoping political and social liberalisation would be ushered in. They also believed the French would provide a bulwark against the menacing Ottoman Turkish Empire. Even the peasants made their appearance in Zakynthos town demanding the lowering of usurious interest and taxation foisted on them by the Nobili. Ironically, some of these large landowners were ardent supporters of the ideas of the French Revolution. Importantly, this was the first time this class had entered Zakynthian politics after centuries of oppression under the Neapolitans and the Venetians. Gentili met many of their demands.

However, it was quite clear early on that the French were not interested in giving the islands self-determination in accordance with the principles of the French Revolution and the desires of the Ionian Islanders; but, occupation as exemplified by the letter Napoleon sent to Gentili:

''You will make every effort to win the sympathy of the people there, since you have to govern them ... If the inhabitants there declare a willingness to be independent, you have to deal with this desire.''

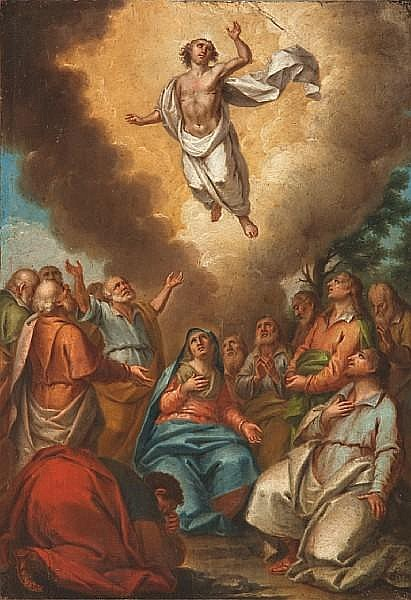
The Assumption by Nikolaos Kantounis, c. late 18th/early 19th century

At this stage, Zakynthians were not aware of French policy. In every square across the Ionian Islands, including St Marks in Zakynthos, the locals planted the Tree of Freedom. Locals also ran to the houses of the Nobili and collected their wigs, Venetian uniforms, coats of arms and parchments with nobility titles. They gathered these items in central squares like St Marks and ceremoniously burned them. The crowd even sought the wig of the last Venetian provveditore, Francesco Bragadin but he demanded payment for his wig. The crowd raised the necessary funds and then burnt his wig too. They also burnt the detested Libro d'Oro, containing the pedigree trees of local Noble families. The former Nobili in Zakynthos locked themselves in their palazzo for fear of retribution from the lower classes. In some sense, the Popolari had finally triumphed after their humiliations in 1628 and 1683.

But this was not to last. And even very early on during French rule support for a rival power was evident. For example, 20 days after their arrival, a crowd of Zakynthians chanted for the Russian emperor and raised the Russian imperial flag in Zakynthos town. The French garrison had to disperse the crowd by force.

The French initially tried to organize the administration of the Ionian Islands according to their own revolutionary standards that included the greater participation of lower classes than Venetian rule. In Zakynthos doctors, lawyers, former so called Nobles, Cittadini, Popolari and clerics from the Orthodox and Catholic churches were included in a 40-member interim governing council. Importantly, this council included Antonios Martinengos, who was to play a key role in Zakynthian politics for the next 20 years or so. Furthermore. the civil and criminal courts were reorganised, a jury system was gradually introduced, the first public schools were established and the first printing presses were set up. The Ionian Islanders even adopted the French Revolutionary Calendar in official documents dating back to the 1st year of Freedom and establishing a 4 August national holiday.

However, the initial Zakynthian enthusiasm for the French rapidly dissipated primarily due to discontent about greater levels of taxation, the method of tax collection and the habit of French authorities borrowing from local merchants and failing to later meet their obligations. Also, promises of self-government did not come to fruition. But what really bothered the locals was the growing contempt French had for their institutions, like the Orthodox religion, its Church and other traditions. Ionians Islanders including Zakynthians mobilised by Nobili who had lost their privileges began to conduct public protests and form political associations to disseminate new ideas against French rule. These activities were also noticed by the Russians, the British and the Ottoman Turks.

== Septinsular Republic (1800–1807) ==
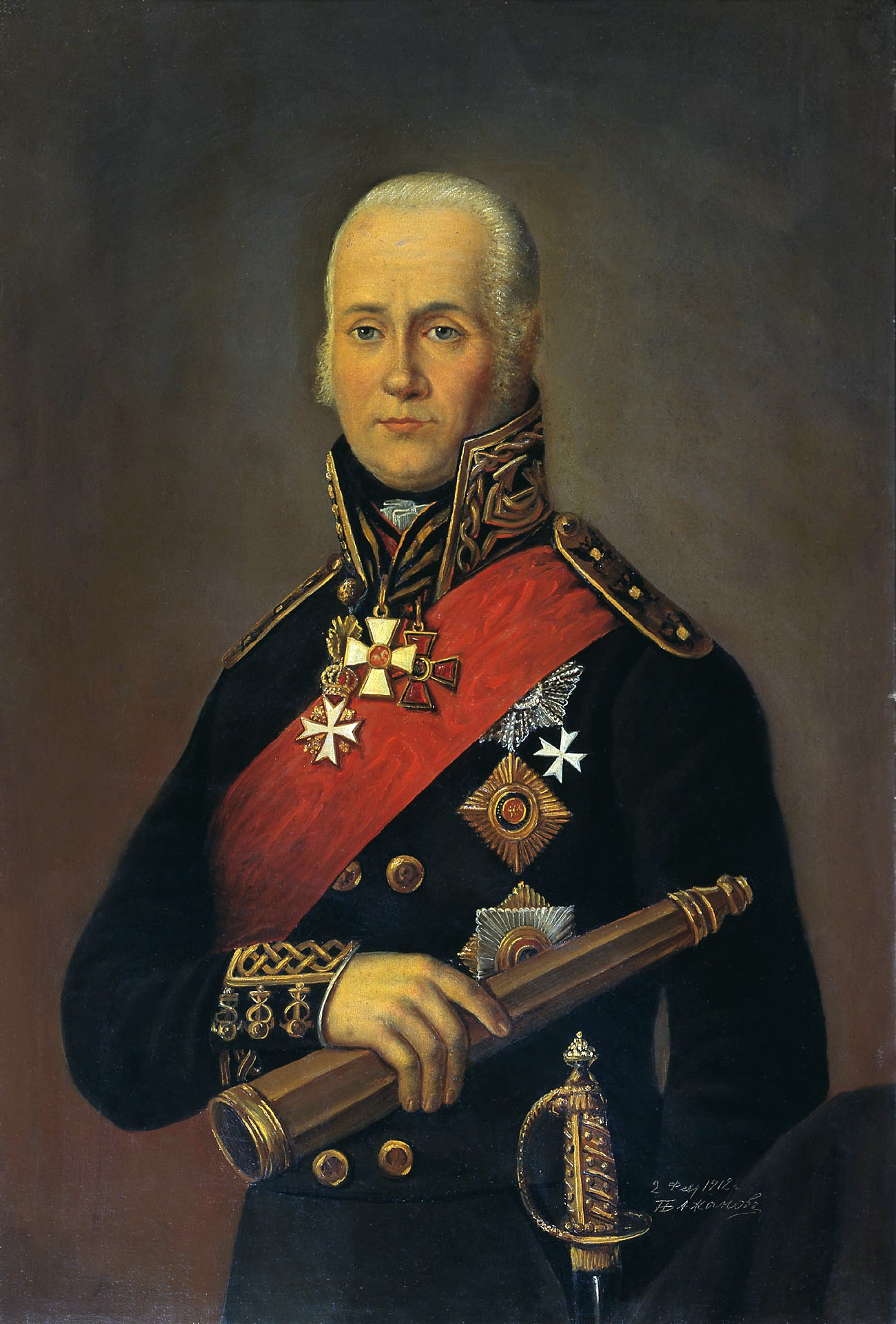
Fyodor Fyodorovich Ushakov by Peter Bajanov, 1912

Following French naval losses in the Mediterranean, and mobilization by the Russians and Ottoman Turks alarmed at previous French advances in the Mediterranean and even mainland Greece – and encouraged by the British – the French were forced to surrender the Ionian Islands under the pressure of siege and assault by Russian and their Ottoman Turkish allies. Many large landowners of Zakynthos, some merchants and the Church assisted. Following the collapse of French rule, a combined Russian-Ottoman Turkish fleet under the command of Admiral Ushakov captured the island of Zakynthos on 23 October 1798 after capturing Kythera a few weeks before. The remaining Ionian Islands were captured shortly after.

=== Admiral Ushakov and the peasant uprising (1798) ===
The French garrison forces on Zakynthos included 444 men and 47 officers, their auxiliaries and remaining Zakynthian supporters. They feared they were unable to put up a strong defence against Ushakov's approaching forces; particularly, since the fortifications of the castle above Zakynthos town were in severe disrepair. Furthermore, much of the local population ranging from the old Nobili who had fled to their estates in the countryside, to the devout peasants were supportive of the Russian advance; although, they knew little of the involvement of their Ottoman Turkish allies at that time.

Perhaps the turning point of this episode was the mobilisation of 8,000 armed peasants waving Russian flags from all areas of rural Zakynthos and led by a so-called Kapa-Nikolis from the village of Macherado. This shocked the French garrison and their Zakynthian supporters – what they thought was a small revolt now resembled a mass uprising across the rural parts of the island. Following their appearance after the arrival of Gentili, the peasants were now starting to become an important political factor in Zakynthian history.

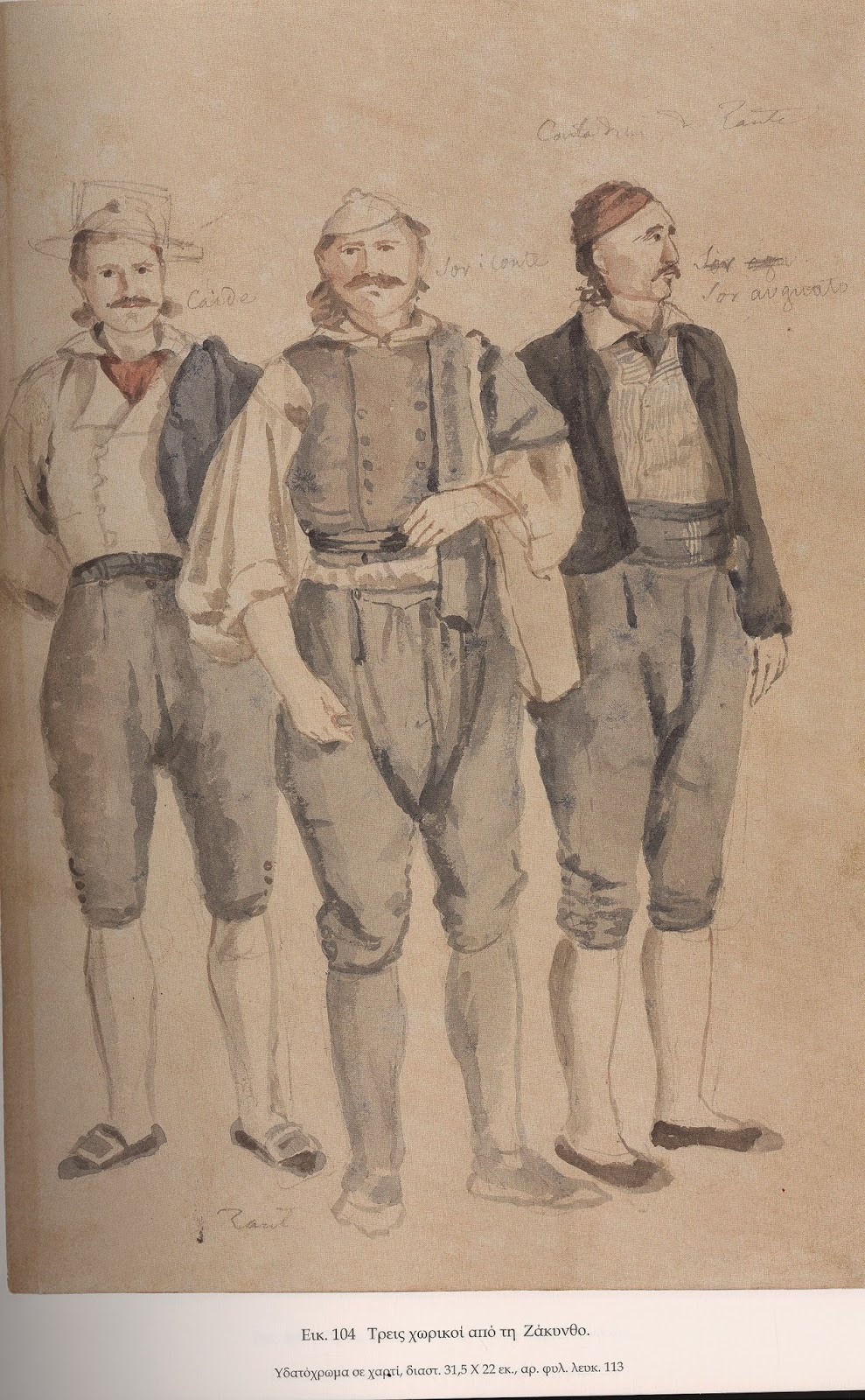
Three Zakynthians peasants by Gerasimos Pitzamanos, 1804–1807

The French abandoned their coastal batteries and retreated entirely into the castle above Zakynthos town. Sensing a crushing victory over the French and the Zakynthian Patriots, and buoyed by their newly found political freedom, the peasants rushed the French into Zakynthos town but were held at bay by the French artillery. In frustration, they ransacked government buildings, public records were burnt in St Mark's Square (including the Tree of Freedom) and the prisons were opened. They even pillaged the homes of pro-French Zakynthians and stormed the Jewish neighbourhood in Zakynthos town because they had sided with the French.

The Zakynthian peasants were dismayed when they noticed the presence of Ottoman Turkish troops among the Russian force; however, Ushakov persuaded them they were strictly under his command. The French garrison shot at the incoming Russian force from Zakynthos castle but foreseeing a massacre given the size of the peasant army gathered under the castle, they negotiated a surrender shortly after. The French soldiers were treated with respect by the combined Russian-Ottoman Turkish force but the pro-French Zakynthians were not afforded the same privilege and were either beaten in St Mark's Square by the peasants, imprisoned awaiting trial or fled the island. Ushakov was jubilantly welcomed by the Zakynthians including Nobili who wore their finery once again to greet the Russian admiral. However, they were extremely reluctant to offer the same hospitality to his Ottoman Turkish allies.

Like the French, Ushakov promised self-determination and respect for the traditions and customs of the island. However, despite their hatred of the French, the Zakynthian Popolari, Cittadini and peasants rapidly realised that the form of self-government proposed by Ushakov would likely entail being governed by the Nobili and prey to their venality. Consequently, the peasants demanded direct annexation to Russia to counter the Nobili. However, Ushakov did not have a mandate to meet their demands and resorted to the powers in Constantinople and St Petersburg regarding the long-term future of the island. In the meantime, three local archons and an elected council were to be appointed by Ushakov to govern the island. The council was to be evenly divided between the Nobili and Cittadini so that the Nobili would not monopolise government; however, in reality the Nobili would rule and provide protection to the Cittadini.

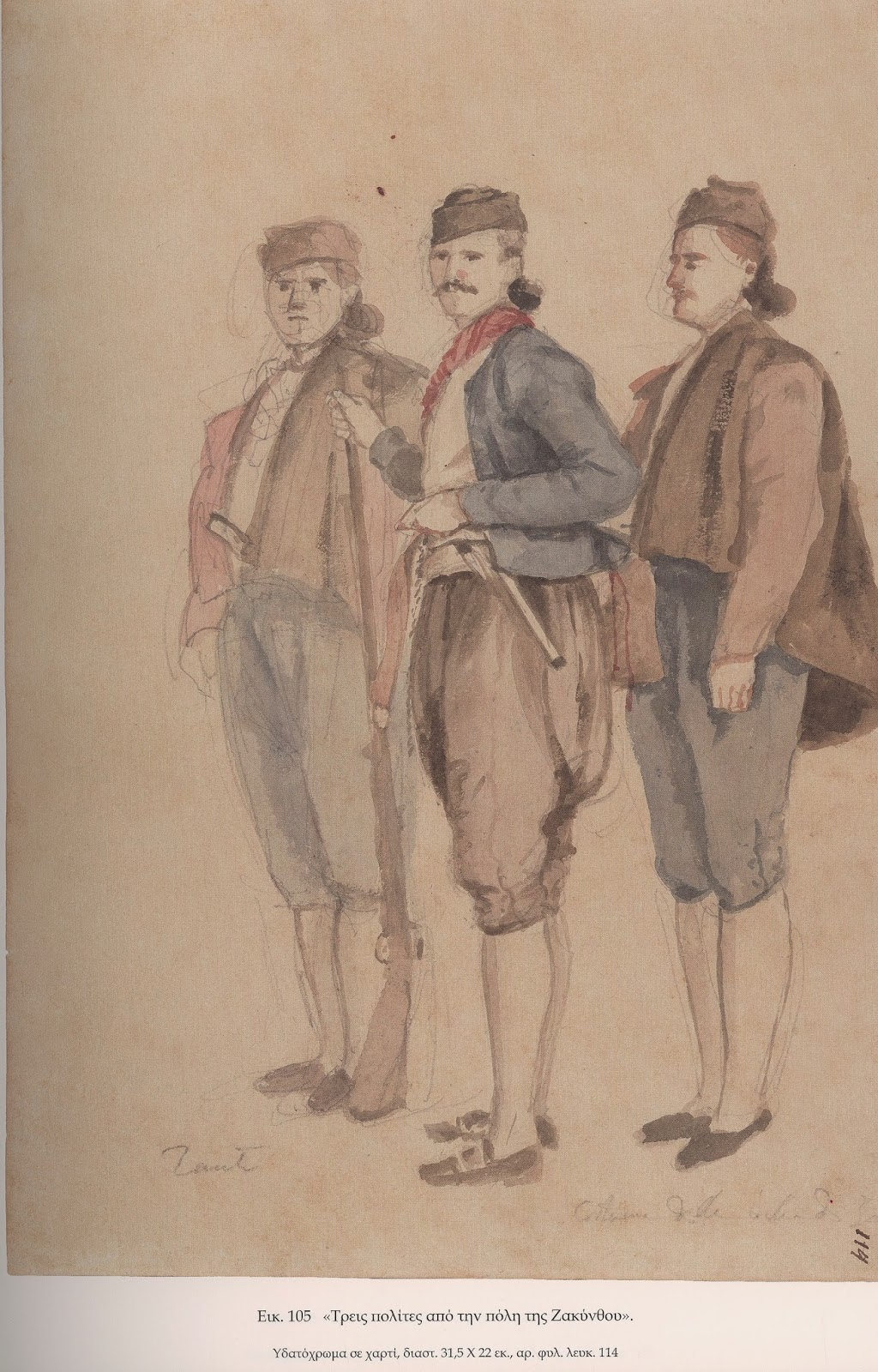
Three Cittadini or Popolari perhaps as part of a militia in Zakynthos town by Gerasimos Pitzamanos, 1804–1807

=== Plot to massacre the Nobles (1799) ===
Resistance continued to grow among the Cittadini, Popolari and some of the peasants to the reinstatement of the privileges of the Nobili, and even the reinstatement of a recreated Libro d’Oro so detested by the other classes of Zakynthos. Only the names prior to the arrival of the French were to be included. Much of the resistance coalesced around the figure of Antonios Martinengos. Although probably the richest man in Zakynthos, and from an old aristocratic family, he was refused inclusion in the recreated Libro d’Oro because he was deemed of illegitimate birth. His enormous wealth also generated resentment among the old Nobili. Consequently, he savagely turned against his own Nobili class. It is said he was capable of mobilising thousands of supporters the Cittadini, Popolari and peasant classes and across all areas of Zakynthos.

In a fit of fury, he started planning along with the rural leader and relative, Stelios Stravopodis, the massacre of the Nobili during one of their meetings in Zakynthos town with the Russian lieutenant in place of the absent Usakaov, Tisenhausen to elect the archons and local council of the island scheduled for 21 October 1799. According to Martinengos's plan, crowds were expected to gather waiting his commands next to the building where the Nobili were planning to meet in St Mark's Square. Within that crowd was an armed group under the leadership of Michael Tsintos or Kolelas. Another group under the order of Martinengos was going to set fire to the meeting place of the Nobili. In the chaos that would have eschewed, the armed group would enter the building and murder the Nobili.

As planned on the morning of 21 October 1799, a crowd started to gather around the meeting place of the Nobili waiting on Martinengos. The Nobili thought the crowd had gathered to await the election of the archons and local council. However, during the previous evening, Martinengos had changed his mind about the abominable crime he was planning and sent Stravopodis to the crowd and armed group to advise they cease their operations. Without the apparent of Martingenos the assembled crowd started to drift back to their homes. But Michael Tsintos and his group set fire to the building before the arrival of Stravopodis. A supporter of Martingengos, also regretting the plan to set fire to the building, advised the Nobili to flee. The Russian soldiers rapidly apprehended Michael Tsintos and several members of his group.

Michael Tsintos and his group were sentenced to death by the Russian occupying authorities. They decided to behead Michael Tsintos and placed his head in the square of Agios Nikolas tou Molou to set an example to the islanders. Other accomplices were savagely beaten by the Russian soldiers. Others were exiled and their property confiscated. Tiesenhausen then announced that the leaders of the plot, Martinengos and Stravopodis were to report to him within 24 hours. However, they had fled into the mountainous interior of the island.

Martinengos used his wealth to bribe many officials and so managed to free himself and Stravopodis from the accusation of being ringleaders of the planned massacre of the Nobili. Furthermore, using important intermediaries, he managed to ultimately gain the favour of Tisenghausen rather than his wrath. Despite protestations from some of the Nobili, a few months later Antonios Martinengos and Stelios Stavropodis even managed to be included in the recreated Libro d'Oro and consequently the local council.

=== Creation of the Septinsular Republic (1800) ===
Flag of the Septinsular Republic

After a long period of negotiations, in 1800, the Treaty of Constantinople was drafted and ratified by the Russians and Ottomans, creating the Septinsular Republic, which consisted of Zakynthos along with the islands of Corfu, Cephalonia, Lefkada, Ithaca, Paxos and Kythera. The Republic was established to be nominally under the sovereignty of the Ottoman Empire but protected by Russia.

One of the most difficult problems the nascent Septinsular state had to overcome was the formation of a strong central government out of the civil administrations that Ushakov had established on each island. The general lawlessness of the islands and the prominence of vendetta feuds made governing by the local civil administration difficult, let alone a central government located elsewhere. Even during the convocation of a Senate in Corfu in late 1799 to establish the central government experienced difficulties due to the separatist tendencies in Zakynthos and Cephalonia – they refused to send delegates to Corfu. The general crisis was averted when Ushakov went as far as having to persuade, with a suggestion of force, these islands to send delegates to Corfu for the Ionian Assembly. Over time, the senate in Corfu degenerated into pro-Russian and pro-Ottoman Turkish camps. Not surprisingly, the old Nobili favoured an authoritarian form of central government preferred by the Ottomans, whereas the Cittadini and Popolari favoured broader representation and protection from the Ottoman Empire. Several hundred Zakynthians even sent a petition on April 4, 1799, requesting the inclusion of the Popolari in government to ward off further civil strife on the island.

=== Coup d'état of Antonios Martinengos (1801) ===
The governance of Zakynthos was also complicated by the intervention of other foreign powers like the British. Britain had steadily grown alarmed by the growth of Russian power in the Mediterranean; particularly, Corfu. It also had a strong interest in the currant trade between Zakynthos and Kefalonia and northern Europe. In order to provide a counterweight to the power of Russia, Ottoman Turkish Empire and the Septinsular central government, and also because of narrow economic interests, some Zakynthian Nobili and Cittadini maintained contact with the British Admiral Nelson via the intermediary of Spyridon Foresti, the British consul in Corfu. The Zakynthian local council even went as far as to award Nelson a Gold Sword in appreciation for his efforts to help in removing the French from the island.

Throughout 1800 agitation increasingly grew on Zakynthos, as the Cittadini, Popolari and peasants began to understand that essentially complete power had been handed back to the Nobili of each island which were given almost free rein to oppress the local population again as they had done for centuries. In addition, one of the articles in the constitution of the Septinsular Republic only recognised the Nobili included in the Libro d'Oro before November 1799 – which would have excluded the newly included Antonions Martinengos, his brother-in-law and Stelios Stavropodis. Another consequence was they would be excluded from the local council. This created another rupture with the senate in Corfu and their allies among the Nobili on Zakynthos. As a consequence, a small Septinsular force from Kerykra was ordered to be sent to Zakynthos to quell dissent. At the same time in Zakynthos, 2,000 armed peasants under the leadership of the Nobili gathered at the estate of Nikolaos Foskardis and planned to lay siege to Zakynthos town and deal with Antonios Martinengos and his party. In turn, Antonios Martinengos's forces took all measures to defend the town and the local council.

In 1801, James Callander, a British officer under the service of Nelson, arrived in Zakynthos to spread propaganda against the French regime on the island. He had met with Antonios Martinengos and his party and they came to the conclusion they needed each other to realise their objectives on the island. Broader geopolitical events had evolved and the Russian military contingent was withdrawn from Zakynthos and some of the other Ionian Islands. On the night of 7 February, under fire from Foskardis's peasant forces, armed men from Martinengos's party led by Tzortzi Strouza-Solomos, along with the support of the British officer James Callander, overpowered the garrison in the castle, lowered the Russian and Ottoman Turkish flags and raised the British flag. Furthermore, the following day Martinengo's forces declared independence from the central government of the Septinsular Republic. In effect, initiating a coup d'état. They faced little resistance from the peasants under the guidance of Foskardis and Septinsular troops based in Corfu failed to arrive.

A representative of the Septinsular Republic who also happened to be Zakynthian, Nikolaos-Draganigos Sigouros-De Syllas arrived on the island on 11 February, and met with the British consul, Sargint, Callander, Martinengos and the Nobili. Sigouros-De Syllas then proceeded to visit his palazzo in Zakynthos town despite warnings from people in the local council that they could not guarantee his safety from the Cittadini and Popolari. A short time later, an armed group peasants and Popolari under the orders of Martinengos surrounded the palazzo of De Syllas and demanded he leave the island. The next day almost the whole town was up in arms against Sigouros-De Syllas. Some members of the Cittadini and Popolari had now set up a cannon threatening the palazzo of Sigouros-De Syllas. Also, a ship from the Septinsular Republic tried to dock in Zakynthos but was also threatened by an armed men representing Antonios Martinengos. Finally, Sigouros-De Syllas and his family was led away to an Ottoman Turkish frigate anchored off Zakynthos by a British escort. Furthermore, the forces under the leadership of the Nobili, Foskardis noticing that the British were providing some legitimacy to the part of Martinengos, also deemed it prudent to withdraw. The island of Zakynthos was now effectively independent of the Septinsular Republic.

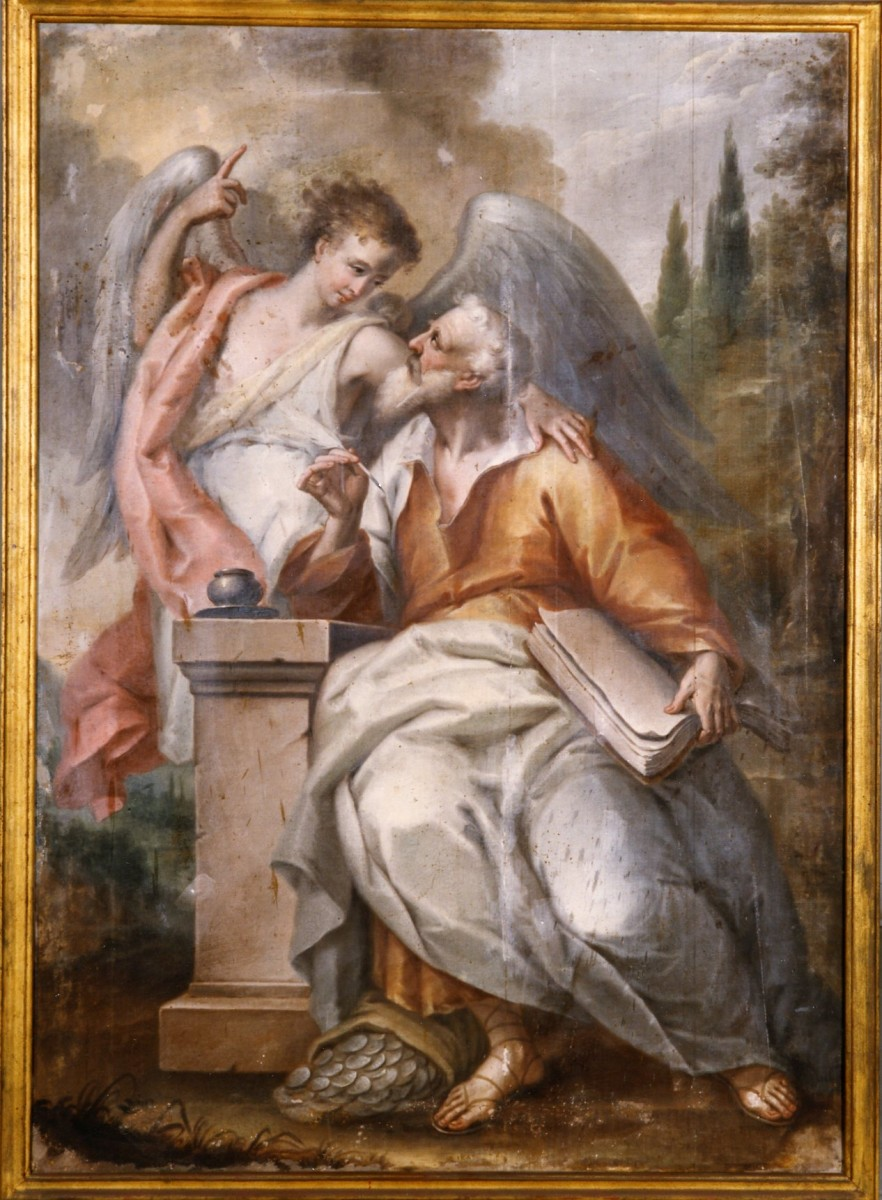
Matthew the Evangelist by Nikolaos Kantounis, c. late 18th/early 19th century

In September 1801, five Ottoman Turkish and one British warship carrying British soldiers appeared in the port of Zakynthos. After some negotiations, the request by the visiting British naval captain was granted and the party of Martinengos took down the British flag from the castle seven months after having raised it. Zakynthos was reconciled, at least for the time being, to the Septinsular Republic. The Ionian Assembly now handed power in Zakynthos to a three-man group called the Syndikoi which was elected by the Great council of the Nobili. The Syndikoi in turn elected a chancellor to govern the island for four months. Afterwards it was rotated to other members of the Syndikoi. The first Syndikoi elected were Antonios Komoutos, Ioannis Martinengos and Petros Chrysoplevris. Given his duties in leading the local militia, Ioannis Martinengos appointed Stelios Stravopodis in his position. Clearly, the party of Antonios Martinengos had retained power in Zakynthos.

=== Constitutional revision (1803) ===
After continued tension throughout the Ionian Islands, the constitution of the Septinsular Republic was revised in 1803. The so-called Aristocratic Constitution because its first article stated, “The Republic of the United Seven Islands is one and aristocratic”. Russia had appointed Georgios Motsenigos as an executive of Russian and Ottoman Turkish interests in the Republic in 1802. Furthermore, it appointed Antonios Komoutos as President of the Republic and the Kerkyrian and future prime minister of Greece, and Ioannis Kapodistrias as secretary-general. Spyridon Neranztis was also recruited to help draft the revision of the constitution of the Septinsular Republic and also became financial administrator, and Dionysios Flambouriaris became minister of the interior. Three out of the four ministries of the Septinsuler Republic were now held by Zakynthians.

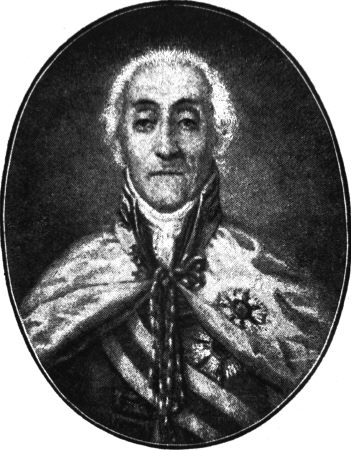
Antonios Komoutos, President of the Septinsular Republic 1803–1807, c. 1806

Despite the moniker it was given, the Constitution of 1803, was generally believed to have better balanced the interests of the Nobili and some Cittadini on one side and the Cittadini, Popolari and peasants on the other. Under the revised Constitution of 1803 hereditary titles were abolished in favour of a bourgeois aristocracy composed of old Nobili and Cittadini whose membership was based strictly on income and educational achievements. The Popolari and especially the peasants still have no real representation. As a result, dissatisfaction reigned across all the classes which led to further trouble. Significantly, the revised Constitution also recognised Greek, along with Italian, as one of the two official languages of the Republic and Eastern Orthodoxy as the state religion. Inadvertently, this was an important step towards ultimate national liberation. The overwhelming majority of the people on these islands during this period were ethnically Greek and Christians, with a small number of Jews on Corfu, Zakynthos and an even smaller number on Cephallonia. The majority of the Christians were Eastern Orthodox. However, there was a significant number of Catholics, especially on Corfu and less so in Zakynthos and Cephallonia.

Another important development during the revision of the Constitution of 1803, was the formation of a 1,200 strong militia for each island recruited from all classes of the islands. Some members of the old Ionian Island Nobili resisted this – harking back to their arguments made on the eve of the Rebellion of the Popolari in 1628 – arguing that only peasants should be subject to military obligations. However, it was finally passed in the Ionian Assembly. Many Arvanite-speaking irregulars served in this militia. Critically, the militia was initially controlled by James Callandar was appointed to lead the militia initially. A short while later after the departure of James Callander, Antonios Martinengos's brother, Ioannis was appointed to lead the militia

There was a further revision of the Constitution in 1806 which gave Russia further power to intervene in the internal affairs of the Septinsular Republic. More positively, for the next couple of years the economy of Zakynthos and many of the Ionian Islands grew strongly; particularly the production and trade of currants in Zakynthos and Cephallonia and olive oil in Corfu. Also, shipping was also a rapidly growing industry; particularly, in Cephallonia. However, broader geopolitical events were again about the change the political situation in Zakynthos and the Ionian Islands.

== French Napoleonic Rule (1807–1809) ==
In 1806, the Ottoman Empire declared war on the Russian Empire; and thereafter, the Septinsular Republic was ceded to Napoleon's First French Empire under the terms of the Treaty of Tilsit in 1807. In August 1807, the French General Cesar Berthier arrived in Corfu from southern Italy with 4,000 French and close to equal the number of Italian troops and artillery. Napoleon placed high strategic value on Corfu ahead of the other Ionian Islands, Parga on the Greek mainland and even Sicily. And so, most of his forces were concentrated on Corfu rather than Zakynthos and Kefalonia. He only placed a 1,200 strong Greek-Albanian and Italian militia, 25–30 French soldiers and four French officers on each island. This relatively small garrison would have consequences later.

Initially, the Constitution of the Septinsular Republic was abolished, the islands were annexed and the islanders became subjects of the French Empire placing them under the governornate of Berthier in late 1807. His troops symbolically raising the French flag over the citadel of Fortezza Vecchia in Corfu in place of the flag of the Septinsular Republic. Obviously, this caused serious indignation and dissent among Zakynthians and other Ionian Islanders. However, ultimately the islands were not annexed by France and she decided to largely retain their institutions of government and the Constitution of 1806. On March 28, 1808, Berthier was replaced by his former assistant, François-Xavier Donzelot. The merchants of Zakynthos and Kefalonia were also very displeased with the consequences of the Continental Blockade applied by Napoleonic France during this period. This blockade particularly impacted the currant producers and merchants of Zakynthos and Kefalonia given they relied so heavily on British markets to sell their produce. The blockade also resulted in food shortages on the islands. It is no surprise that there were many elements on the island; particularly, among the Civili and even some Popolari, which were sympathetic to the British because they believed it was a stronger guarantor to their commercial interests. People like the former President of the Septinsular Republic, Antonios Komoutos maintained secret contacts with the former British diplomat, Spyridon Foresti who was then living in Malta.

In the meantime, for many years 4,000–5,000 farm hands would travel annually to the Peloponnese and Roumeli from the island of Zakynthos. The Zakynthian farm hands brought back valuable grain as payment for their services – given Zakynthos often suffered grain shortages due to the over-reliance on currant trade and production – but they also started to imbue their fellow mainland Greeks with ideas and songs of freedom such as Rigas Ferraios's battle hymn and Zakynthians poets such as Antonios Martelaos which sometimes upset the local Ottoman Turkish authorities. At the same time, the previous Russian occupiers had established mercenary forces on the island with a view to using those forces for their interests at a later time. Specifically, two regiments had spent time training on the island, one under the command of Anagnoti Papagiorgiou who led Peloponnese forces and another Pieros Grigorakis who led a Maniot force. In addition, the local militia was providing a valuable opportunity for local Zakynthians to train in warfare. Most significantly, in April 1806, Theodoros Kolokpotronis, who would play in the leading role in the Greek War of Independence, visited Zakynthos for the second time. He came into immediate contact with locals such as Dionysios Romas who shared similar visions of independence. The seeds were being planted for what would come later.

=== British invasion of the Ionian Islands (1809) ===
A year after the initial French Napoleonic occupation of Zakynthos, the wider European conflict brought the British Brigadier-General, John Oswald to the Mediterranean, in charge of a brigade harrying the coast of French-occupied Italy, Illyria and the Ionian Islands. Before the impending invasion of the Ionian Islands, Spyridon Foresti via Komoutos and other leaders promised the Zakynthians that the British would not come as occupiers but as liberators and help to re-establish the Septinsular Republic and raise the flag of the Septinsular Republic. Supported by his party representing the old interests of the Nobili, Komoutos expected to become President of the re-established Septinsular Republic. He was supported in Zakynthos in this endeavour by the dominant party of Antonios Martinengos.

On 1 October 1809, Oswald led an invading force to Zakynthos and quickly compelled the French-led garrison to surrender by 4 October 1809. Over the next few days, Oswald and his crew captured Kefalonia and then later Ithaca and Kythera. This ushered in the beginning of the British possession of these islands until 1864. The large and influential faction of pro-British sympathsisers on Zakynthos and Kefalonia led by people like Antonios Komoutos, allied with Antonios Martinengos and his followers and the machinations of Foresti in Malta helped to ease the invasion. After the invasion of Kefalonia, Oswald announced to the islanders:

We present ourselves to you, inhabitants of Cephalonia, not as Invaders, with views of conquest, but as Allies who hold forth to you the advantages of British protection, in the freedom and extension of your commerce, and in the general prosperity of your island. Contrast these obvious advantages with the privations you have laboured under since you were pass over from the yoke of Russians to that of the French, and deprived at one blow, of your independence as a nation, and your rights of freedom as men. We demand from you no exertions but such as a necessary for your own liberation – no other aid than what reciprocal advantage requires.

However, the islands were occupied by the British until 1815, when they were transformed into a British colony; enosis with Greece would not happen until 1864.

== British Occupation (1809–1815) ==
After the capture of Zakynthos, Kefalonia and Ithaci, in 1810, Oswald and Richard Church, an Irish Captain invaded Lefkada with a force of 2,000 British soldiers and Greek volunteers mostly gathered from mainland Greece and Zakynthos and formed into the 1st Greek Light Infantry. The combined British and Greek forces captured Lefkada after heavy fighting in April 1810. For this Oswald was made governor of the Ionian Islands and based in Zakynthos. He rapidly formed diplomatic relations with the Ottoman Turkish governors of mainland Greece. When Oswald left for England in 1811, Richard Church succeeded him. Corfu was still defended by a strong French garrison under General Donzelot. As late as 1814, it was ordered to surrender to Sir James Campbell by Louis XVIII.

== Greek War of Independence (1821–1832) ==
=== Filiki Eteria ===
The Filiki Eteria (or Society of Friends) was a secret 19th-century organization created to end the Ottoman rule of Greece and establish an independent Greek state. The Society members were mainly young Greek merchants from Russia and Romania, local Greek chieftains and clergy, some Phanariots and scholars inside and outside Greece. The Society was responsible for initiating the Greek War of Independence in the spring of 1821. Fired by their zeal for the liberation of Greece ordinary citizens and prominent members of Zakynthian society were also active members of the Filiki Eteria.

Since the Orlov Revolt in 1770, as had always happened in Zakynthian history, a groups of Peloponnesian refugees had settled on the island.; although, they had retained links with their ancestors in the Peloponnese. When the Peloponnesian chieftain and unofficial leader, Theodoros Kolokotronis, was being pursued by the Ottoman Turkish authorities he naturally fled to nearby Zakynthos where over the course of time he trained with the various occupying powers of the island.

Kolokotronis was initiated into the Filiki Eteria in Zakynthos. Despite the potentially serious consequences it would have to their reputation and social position, several prominent Zakynthians joined and became active in the Filiki Eteria. They were, amongst others, Dionysios Romas, Anastasios Flambouriaris, Frangiskos Karvelas, Nikolaos Kolyvas, Antonios Martelaos, Constantinos Dragonas, Caesar Efstathiou Logothetis and Antonios Martinengos. Some of them were issued arrest warrants by the British colonial government of the time, such as Dionysios Romas and Anastastasios Flambouriaris, and had to flee the island. Dionysios Solomos also became a member in 1818. In addition, Nikolaos and Panagiotis Stefanou whose grandfather migrated to Zakynthos after the Orlov Revolt joined the Filiki Eteria and participated in the Greek War of Independence. Panagiotis Stefanou helped in the liberation of the harem of Hirsut Pasha during the fall of Tripoli in 1821.

Giorgios Tertsetis was another prominent participant in the Filiki Etaria and the Greek War of Independence. After returning from his studies in Italy, he joined the Filiki Eteria and then joined the war in the Peloponnese. He became a professor and judge soon after the Greek state was established and defended Kolokotronis against charges of high treason.

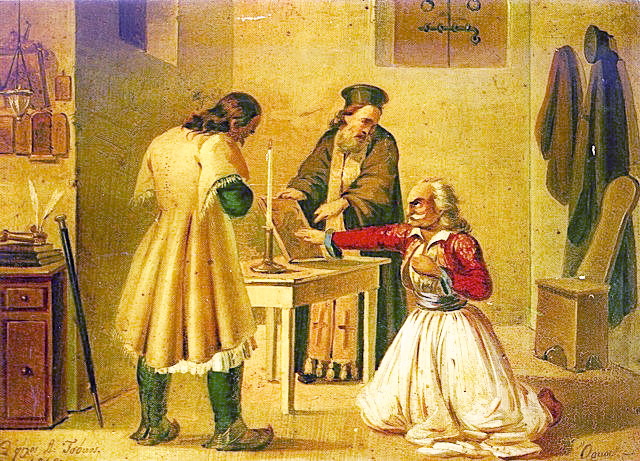
The Oath by Dionysios Tsokos showing the swearing in of a person to the Filiki Eteria in Zakynthos

=== Outbreak of Greek War of Independence ===
With the outbreak of the Greek War of Independence, one of its leaders, Alexander Ypsilanti invited the Ionian Islanders to form a corp to help in the fight. Zakynthian participants included Nikolaos Katanis, Spyridon Daliostros, the brothers Nikolaos and Theodoros Kalamas and Giorgios Avramiotis. Other Zakynthians who were members of the Filiki Eteria helped to arrange shipment of ammunition, food and money to the Peloponnese, while taking care of refugees from the Peloponnese and raise money for the hospital foundation in Nauplion. In addition, many Zakynthians played important roles in key battles.

=== Battle of Lala (1821) ===
The Battle of Lala (9–13 June 1821) was one of the first major conflicts of the Greek War of Independence. It was a significant victory for the Greeks against the relieving Ottoman Turkish and the Muslim Albanian forces living in Lalas, Elis which constituted a serious impediment to the liberation struggle in the Peloponnese.

Muslim-Albanians had settled in Lalas, east of Pyrgos for several generations. For many years they raided the nearby farms, burnt houses and livestock of Greek and Turkish landowners on the plains of Gastouni and Pyrgos and even further afield. Consequently, Muslim Albanians of Lalas had become the quasi-sovereigns of Elis.

With the outbreak of the Greek War of Independence in late March 1821, some Greek military leaders recognised the Muslim-Albanian menace around Lalas and the possibility of coming to the aid of the coreligionists, the Ottoman Turks. As a result, the local Greeks initially attempted to siege the Muslim Albanians of Lalas but were not successful. Shortly after on May 13, a small force of Greek soldiers occupied a mountainous position near Lalas. Their position was vulnerable and likely to fall until the appearance of 500 volunteers of Ionian Islanders from Cephallonia and Zakynthos and their four cannons. The Zakynthian volunteers were led by Dionysios Sembrikos.

On May 30 the Ionian Island force had grown with the arrival of fighters from Elis and Kalavryta. The combined Greek force endeavoured to surround Lalas. The Muslim Albanians of Lalas realised their difficult position and were shocked by the number and organisation of the Ionian Island volunteers. Some of the Ionian Island volunteers are likely to have received training in Western military tactics and organisation. The other Greek rebels were also impressed with the organisation of the Ionian Island force. Despite some disagreement between the Ionian Islanders and the Peloponnesians on the timing of their attack on the trapped Muslim-Albanians, the Ionian Islanders sent a letter to the Muslim-Albanians allowing them to surrender peacefully or be attacked and given over to the Peloponnesians. The letters was signed by Dionysios Sembrikos and the Zakynthian Panagtios Strouzas. However, this attempt at resolving the stalemate was indecisive.

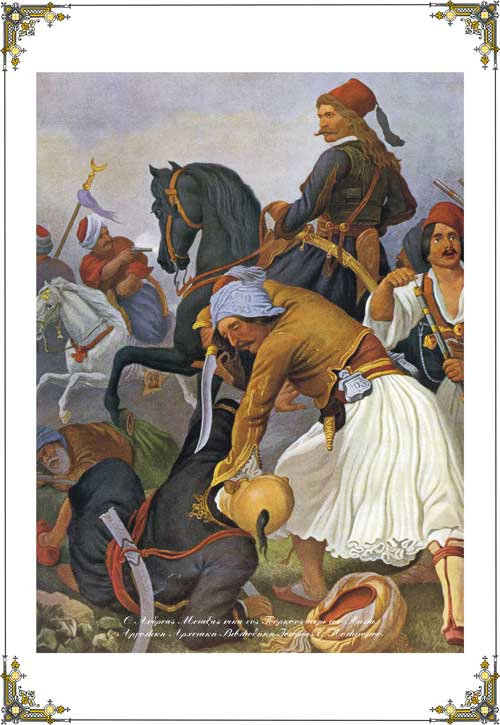
The Battle of Lala by Peter von Hess, 1835. The depiction of Cephalonian leader, Metaxas is unlikely to be incorrect as the Ionian Islanders probably wore a more western-style military uniform.

The combined Greek forces decided to attack but were disorganised and it was repelled. The Muslim-Albanians requested assistance from Yousef Pasha in Patra who responded with around 1000–1500 men including 300 horsemen. When Yousef Pasha's force approached the Muslim-Albanians in Lalas, they attacked the Greek forces, trapping them and allowing Yousef Pasha's fighters to enter Lalas. The Peloponnesians wanted to withdraw at a safe distance but the Ionian Islanders were opposed to this. Yousef Pasha could not wait was he was afraid his main force would be attacked in Patras. Therefore, he took the initiative and attacked first with the aim of breaking the Greek camp, taking their cannons and fleeing to Patras. He met stiff resistance from the Ionian Island force with the Muslims-Albanians sustaining a significant number of casualties. The Zakynthian leader, Dionysios Sembrikos was also injured in battle along with several other Zakynthians.

In June, the Turkish and Muslims Albanians retreated and fled to Patras without capturing any Greek cannon. The combined Greek forces entered Lalas. Ultimately, the Muslim Albanians left Greece and sailed for Anatolia.

The Greek victory was significant as the Muslim-Albanians of Lalas were considered very good fighters. Their displacement from Lalas meant the surrounding area of Elis and the broader north-eastern and central Peloponnese was less vulnerable to attack. The victory also strengthened the resolve of the Greek forces. For their participation in the battle, the Ionian Islanders including the Zakynthian volunteers were arrested and prosecuted by the British colonial government upon their return to the Ionian Islands; some of then were imprisoned while others had their property confiscated.

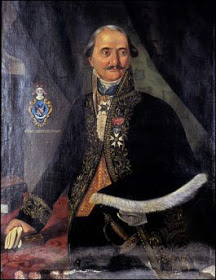
Portrait of Dionysios Romas by Spyridon Pelekasis, c. 1880s.

=== Zakynthos Committee ===
The beginning of the Greek War of Independence resulted in a number of land and naval victories. By 1823, this led to the liberation of most of the Peloponnese, Attiki and Roumeli; although, there were significant reversals in Macedonia, Crete, Cyprus and the eastern Aegean. By late 1823, Greek revolutionary activity became fragmented. However, the Greeks continued to withstand the periodic but uncoordinated Ottoman Turkish attacks. This led them to hiring Albanian-Muslim mercenaries to fight the Greeks.

The First National Assembly was formed at Epidaurus in 1821. The Assembly drafted the first Greek Constitution and appointed the members of a Provisional Government including an executive and a legislative body, the Senate. The First National Assembly consisted almost exclusively of notables from the Peloponnese. A delayed Second National Assembly was held in 1823. The Senate in practice had little significance but was now led by the President, Ioannis Orlandos. Certain influential interests in the previous government and military leaders such as Theodoros Kolokotronis felt marginalized from the new Provisional Government. Furthermore, many distinct centres of power had developed in the Peloponnese. To appease them, the Senate proposed that Kolokotronis become a member of the Executive and Vice President of the Senate. Kolokotronis accepted but his supporters caused a serious rift when they prevented Mavrokordatos, who had been elected President of the Senate after the resignation of Orlandos, from assuming his position. There were now two opposing camps – those supporting the Executive and essentially Kolokotronis and those supporting the Senate.

By late 1823, Kolokotronis resigned from the Executive. Shortly after, the Senate removed key people from their posts sympathetic to Kolokotronis. In response, members of the old Executive, senators sympathetic to their cause and Kolokotronis and his supporters set up a rival government in Tripolis. In 1824, the forces of the new Executive under the leadership of Andreas Londos besieged Tripolis and Nauplion, which was held by Kolokotronis's son. After one month of fighting an agreement was reached between Kolokotronis and Londos and his supporters. In May, the first phase of the civil war officially ended; however, most members of the new Executive were displeased by the moderate terms of the agreement Londos had brokered. Despite the strengthening of the Senate and the new Executive's position, and further buttressed by an English loan, a second civil war broke out in October triggered by resistance to tax levies. However, with assistance of military captains from Roumeli, the rebels was crushed and Kolokotronis and his supporters were imprisoned.

In the meantime, Dionysios Romas was eagerly following events from northern Italy. In mid-1824 he returned to Zakynthos and a short while later, just before the second civil war climaxed, formed the Zakynthos Committee with fellow Zakynthians, Panagiotis Stefanou and Konstantinos Dragonas. However, many members of the Filiki Etairia from Zakynthos were involved in the committee. Their aim was to strengthen the Independence struggle via economic and political means often using their own fortunes. Freemasonry and the Filiki Etairia brought the three men into close cooperation.

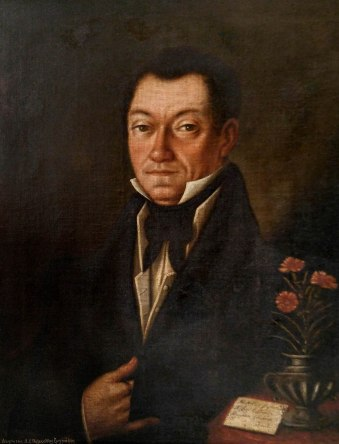
Portrait of Konstantinos Dragonas by unknown painter, c. 1825

Dionysios Romas was inaugurated in the Filiki Etaireia in April 1819; and shortly after, he turned his mansion in Zakynthos town into a meeting place of many Revolutionary chieftains and fighters who had found refuge on the island – including Kolokotronis. Together with Kolokotronis they met with the French General, Danzello, who helped them develop the plans of the Greek War of Independence. In 1820, the British colonial police raided Roma's mansion suspecting that he had been hiding secret nationalist documents. A lower ranking English freemason came to his defence, claiming the documents were Masonic and thus the British colonial authorities ceased all action against him. Nevertheless, to avoid the possibility of being arrested again, Dionysios Romas departed for Venice where he remained for four years.

In 1825, Muhammad Ali of Egypt agreed with the Ottoman Turks to send his son Ibrahim Pasha to Greece. Ibrahim Pasha landed at Methoni in February, and a month later he was joined by his army of 10,000 infantry and 1,000 cavalry. The Greeks were taken by surprise. Ibrahim proceeded to defeat the Greek garrison on the small island of Sphacteria off the coast of Messenia. Ibrahim ravaged the Western Peloponnese and killed Papaflessas at the Battle of Maniaki. The Greeks were now in disarray. To stop the Egyptians they released Kolokotronis from captivity but he too was unsuccessful. By the end of June, Ibrahim had captured the city of Argos and was within striking distance of Nauplion. The city was saved by General Makriyannis and Dimitrios Ypsilantis. Ibrahim's eventually left for Tripolis. At the same time, the Ottoman Turkish armies in Central Greece were besieging the city of Missolonghi for the third time.

The Zakynthos Committee was now working on improving supply to send munitions and food, including the chartering of boats often captained by Zakynthians, to Messolonghi and Navarino that were threatened by Ibrahim's Egyptian forces. Extensive financial resources were provided by donors – including Dionysios Romas himself. The Zakynthos Committee also worked on improving the finances of the Revolutionary Government so as to protect the thousands of women and children refugees, aid in the release of captives and the further organization of volunteer fighters. They also managed spy links into Ibrahim's camp. Perhaps most importantly, they applied to the English for support and protection, or, better known as the Act of Submission. The Deed was drafted by Dionysios Romas, Panagiotis Stefanou and Konstantinos Dragonas, with the cooperation with the high commissioner in Corfu, Frederic Adam.

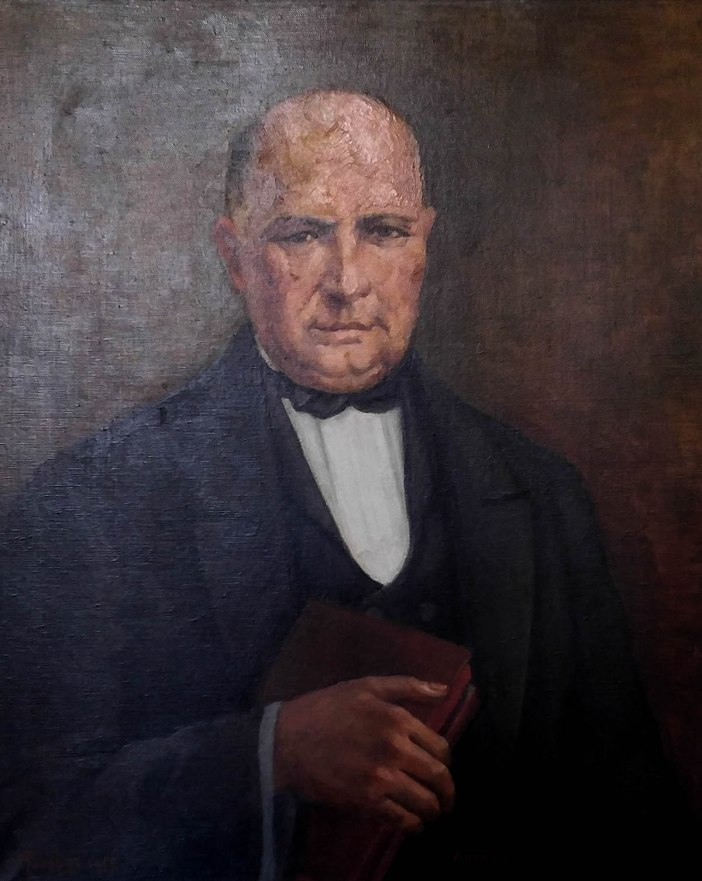
Portrait of Panagiotis Stefanou by Xristos Rousseas, c. 1825

The Zakynthos Committee sent their draft Act of Submission to the leaders of the struggle. Despite it being an Act of Submission it did not constitute a dependence on Britain. The leaders, including Kolokotronis discussed the document, and despite some initial hesitation, signed it on 6 July 1825 and sent it back to the Zakynthos Committee. Other leaders signed the document later in July and it was approved by the legislative committee on 1 August 1825. With the Act of Submission proposal, the Zakynthos Committee to achieve unity of purpose among the various factions of the Greek War of Independence which was sadly absent for many years. In effect, the Zakynthos Committee was now leading the Greek War of Independence struggle.

By September 1825, the Act of Submission was presented to the ambassador to the Ottoman Empire, Stratford Canning in London. He initially rejected the Act as he did not believe Britain should change their neutral stance between the Greeks and the Ottoman Turks. However, the growing realisation that Russia was likely to continue to grow their influence in the Eastern Mediterranean if the British did not act, forced their hand.

== British rule (1815–1864) ==
After a second period under French Napoleonic control (1807–1809) following the Treaty of Tilsit, Zakynthos was occupied by the Great Britain in 1809 after they defeated a nearby French fleet. It was then made part of the British protectorate of the United States of the Ionian Islands from 1815 to 1864.

The Treaty of Paris in 1815 charged Britain with protecting the 'single, free and independent' United States of the Ionian Islands. In 1817, the British government passed a restrictive Constitution and required the ratification of the Constitution by the Protective Power despite the existence of the Ionian Parliament, and maintained garrisons in the forts at the expense of each island and kept foreign affairs in the hands of Britain. In addition, the Protective Power showed little sympathy for the refugees from the Greek War of the Independence.

=== Events of Ipsolithos (1821) ===
In 1821, following the outbreak of the Greek War of Independence, an Ottoman Turkish ship carrying Muslim refugees, after having been pursued by Greek naval vessels, tried to dock in the port of Zakynthos to obtain provisions. The local Zakynthians became angered given the atrocities committed by the Ottoman Turks against Christians in the Ottoman Empire resulting in the infamous Events of the Ipsolithos.

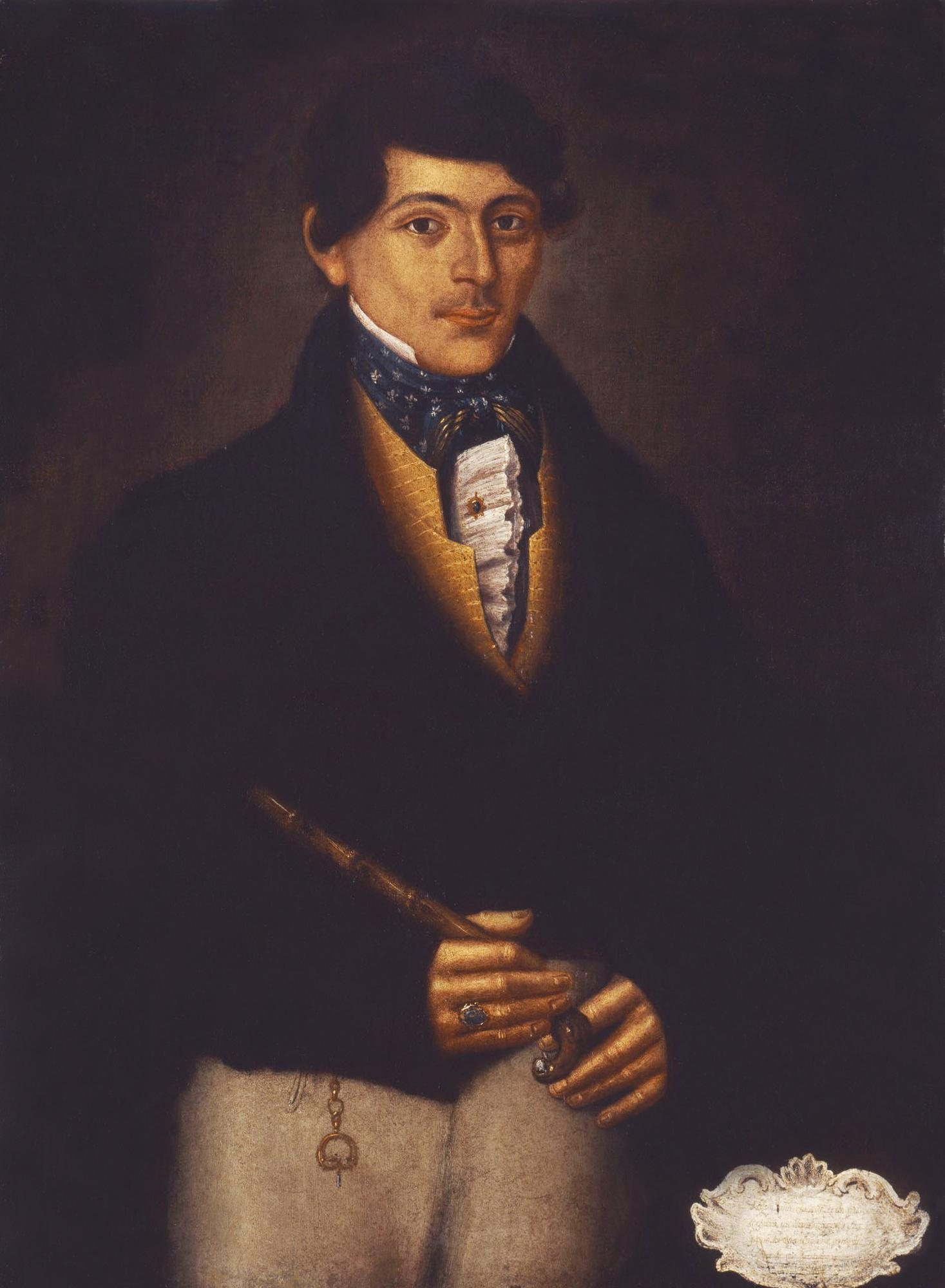
Kyriakos Xoraphas by Ioannis Korais (the younger), 1826

A small group of British soldiers and their presiding officer attempted to ensure the refugees received supplies and adhered to the quarantine regulations. However, the local Zakynthians, some of whom some were armed attacked the British soldiers, killing one and wounding several soldiers including the officer. Consequently, the serving Lord High Commissioner of the Ionian Islands, Thomas Maitland declared martial law for the second time in two years. The declaration also included a ruling to disarm, with a few exceptions, the local population. Maitland also pursued the ring leaders of the attack including Ioannis Klavdianos, Theodoros Petas, Panagiotis Roumeliotis, Dionysios Kontonis and Antonis Grampsas. They were eventually executed based on controversial testimonies by public hanging near Agios Nikolas to Molou in Zakynthos town. Their homes were also ordered demolished by the colonial administration. Other Zakynthians who had agitated against British rule were either imprisoned or exiled.

After they were executed, the bodies of four of the ringleaders were hung in gibbets on the hill overlooking Zankythos town, a common practise in Britain at the time. The body of Yiannis Kavdianos was hung in a gibbet opposite his home in rural Zakynthos. His mother ultimately went mad at having to view this scene on a daily basis.

=== The Party of the Radicals ===
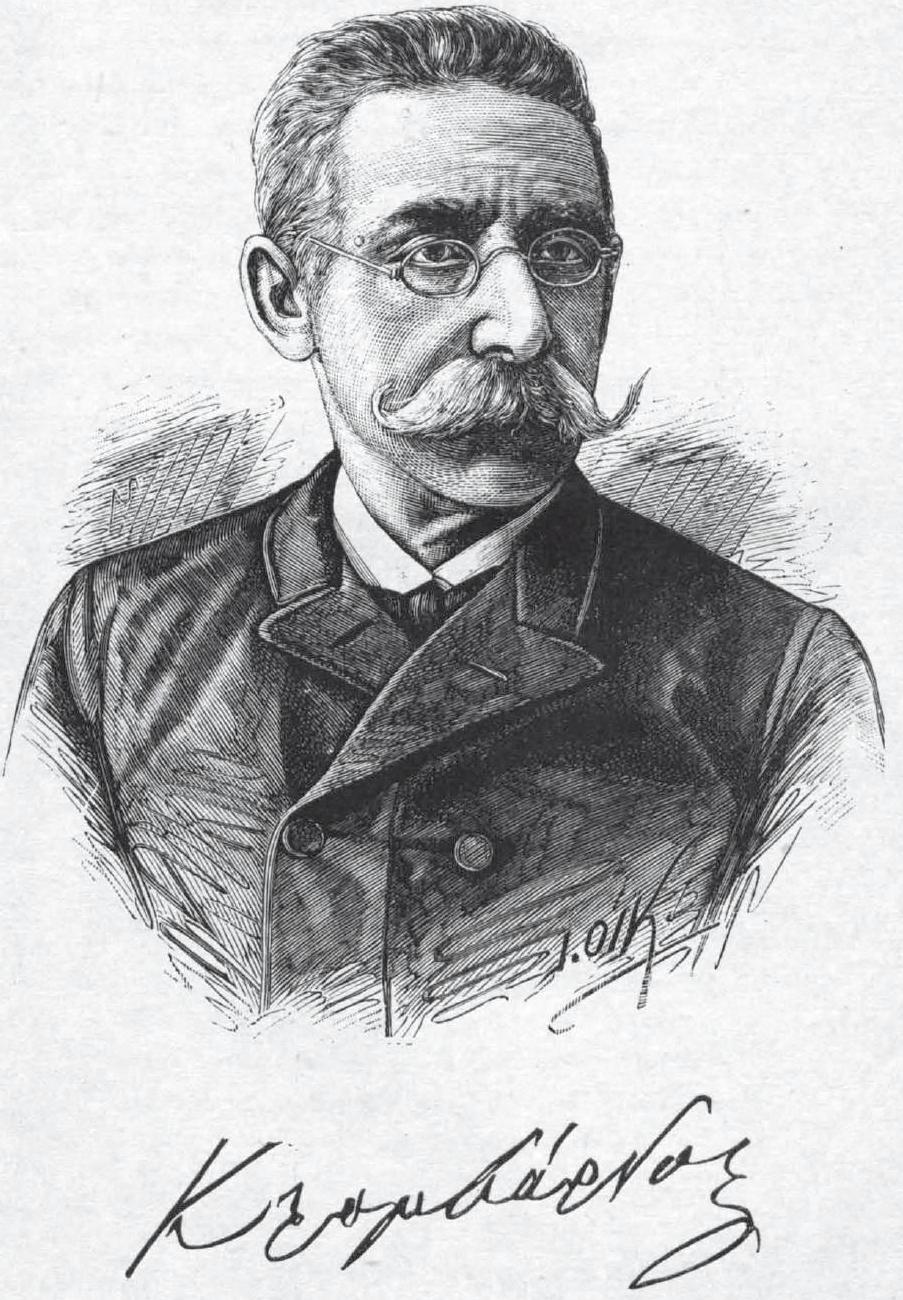
A drawing of Konstantinos Lomvardos by Ioannis Oikonomou, 1888

Around the time of other revolutionary movements in Europe in 1848, the Party of Radicals was formed out of an earlier group called the Liberals to agitate for the end of the British rule of the Ionian Islands and in favor of union with the Kingdom of Greece. The Party is often labelled the first party of principles in Greek history and a precursor to the socialist movement in Greece. However, the Party not only agitated for union with Greece but also protested against the political and social situation in the Greek state. Contacts were maintained with key figures of the Risorgimento including Giuseppe Garibaldi and Giuseppe Mazzini.

In 1850, the Party's MP Ioannis Typaldos proposed in the Ionian parliament in Corfu the resolution for the union of the Ionian Islands with Greece. The resolution was signed by several Zakynthians as well as Kerkyrians and Cephalonians. The colonial government responded with the closure of newspapers like To Mellon in Zakynthos, and the arrest and prosecutions of numerous party members. The two major protagonists Elias Zervos and Iosif Momferatos were exiled to Antikythera and Erikousa respectively. In 1862, the Party was split into two factions, the United Radical Party and the Real Radical Party. The former gave priority to Union rather than socio-political reforms, while the latter believed that only through social reform could complete national rehabilitation be achieved. The Real Radical Party struggled as it faced resistance not only from the British government but also from the Kingdom of Greece. In contrast, the United Radical Party under the leadership of politician and doctor Konstantinos Lomvardos, and to a lesser extent, the journalist Georgios Verikios carried on with their struggle for the union of the Ionian Islands with Greece.

In 1864, the Greek flag was hoisted on the Ionian Islands to welcome the Greek army and unification with the Kingdom of Greece. The United Radical Party was dissolved immediately.

Konstantinos Lomvardos was one of the most prominent members of the Radical movement and a member of the Ionian Parliament from 1852. He was well known for his rhetorical powers. After the Union with the Kingdom of Greece, Lomvardos participated in the government of Koumoundourou as Minister of Education, Interior and Justice. In 1871, he joined the party of Charilaos Trikoupis and was elected President of the House. From 1875 to 1888, he served as Minister of the Interior, Justice and Education. Apart from his political activities, Lomvardos published a number of political and scientific texts. Lomvardos was the founder of the Lomvardos party of Zakynthos.

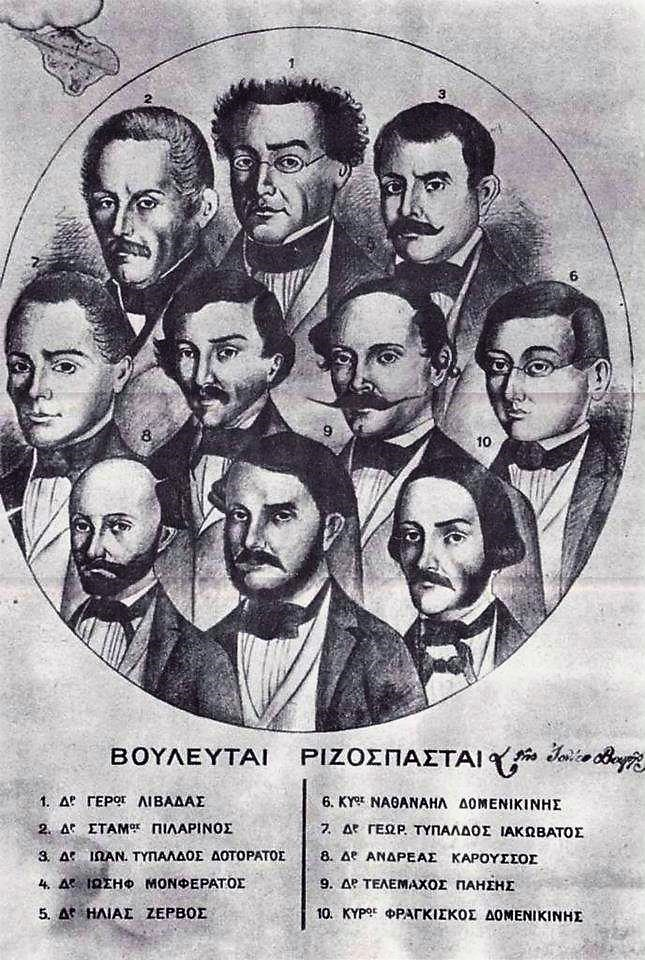
Party of the Radicals members of the Ionian Parliament by unknown artist, c. 1855

Other notable Radicals from Zakynthos were Nathaniel Domeneginis, elected Member of the Ionian Parliament in 1850. He signed, along with Frangiskos Domeneginis and Angelos Desyllas, the first resolution of the Union with Greece. He wrote various leaflets and articles in favor of the Union and against the continuation of British rule. Excited by the revolt in Epirus in 1854, he decided to fight under the command of the generals, Karaiskakis and Tzavelas. In the Battle of Petta in 1854, he was arrested and executed by the Ottomans. Ioannis Lisgaras was a notary from Zakynthos who in 1851 was exiled to the island of Othoni. He was elected Member of the Ionian Parliament of 1852. He fought for the Union with Greece with numerous articles and brochures. In 1866, he was elected Mayor of Zakynthos and was distinguished for his honesty and his excellence in administration and finance.

Frangiskos – Lambrinos Domeneginis, cousin of Nathaniel Domeginis, was a composer, music teacher, conductor, painter and an enthusiastic Radical. In 1829, he took part in the Greek Revolution as an officer of the regular cavalry and distinguished himself in operations around Euboea. He signed the first resolution of the Ionian Parliament and a year later he was exiled to Antikythira. During his exile, he was re-elected as a member. In 1853, he returned to the House and submitted a resolution, together with Lombardos and Verikios, for the return from the Kefalonian Radical exiles Elias Zervos and Iosif Momferatos. He was involved in the Italian-Greek committees where he came into contact with Giuseppe Garibaldi and other prominent activists in the Risorgimento. Dimitrios Kallinikos was very wealthy and well-educated and together with Ioannis Ioannopoulos, Georgios Verikios and Pavlos Tavoularis published the newspaper O Rigas, the first radical newspaper from Zakynthos. He was exiled in 1851. Shortly before the Union with Greece he fell out with the Radicals and ceased participation in the movement. Georgios Verikios was a journalist, orator and prefect. He was one of the first to support the right of self-determination and Union with Greece. He was the editor of the Magos and O Rigas newspapers. Verikios was exiled from the Ionian Islands by the colonial administration for his ideas.

== Union with Greece (1864) ==
The first free Parliament of the Ionian Islands declares that it is the unanimous, firm and resolute desire of the Ionian people to acquire their independence and unite with the rest of their Nation, liberated Greece.

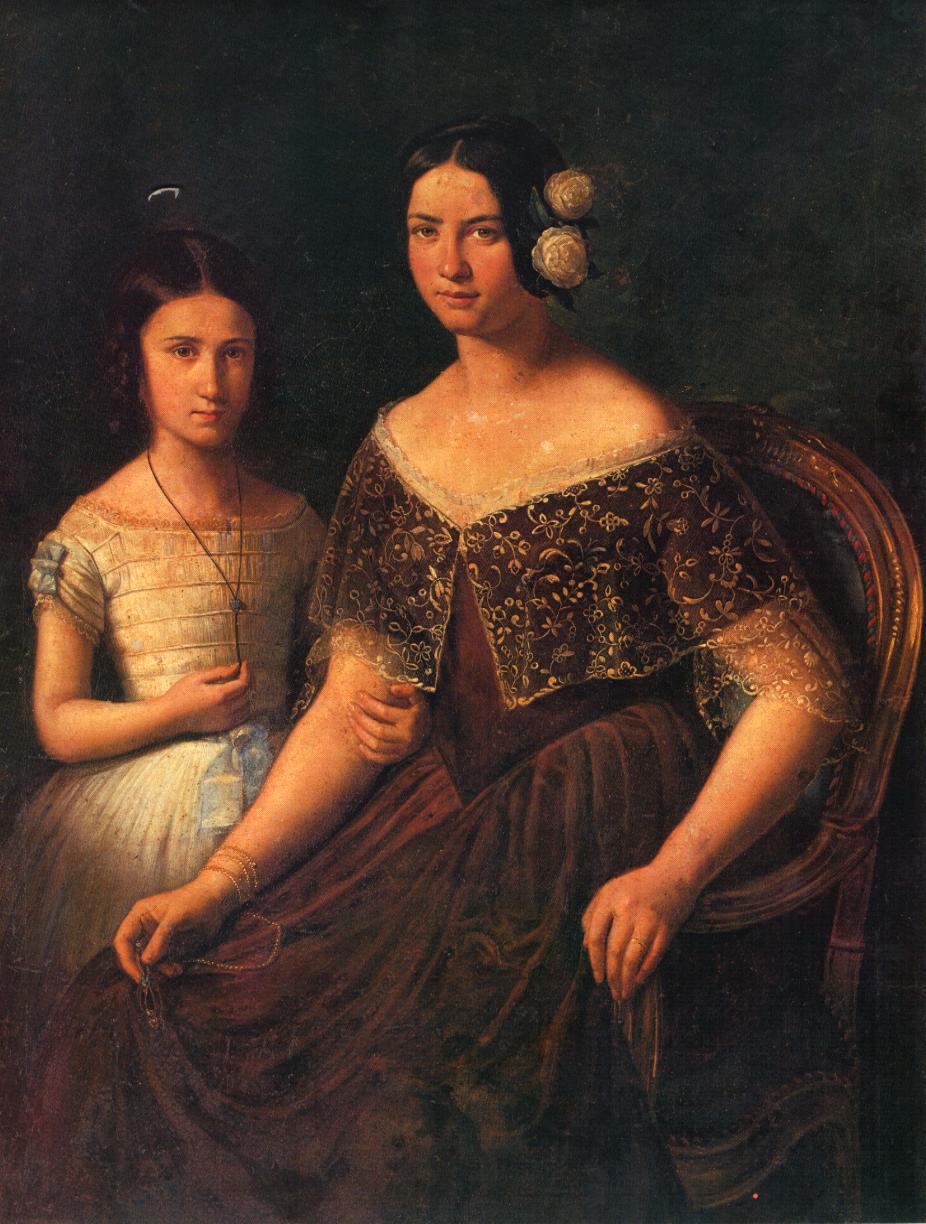
Mother and Daughter by Konstantinos Iatras, c. 1860–1865

A declaration from the Ionian Parliament in late 1864.

And so in 1864, Zakynthos together with all the other Ionian Islands, became a full member of the Greek state, ceded by Britain to stabilize the rule of the newly crowned Danish-born King of the Hellenes, George I. The last British troops left the Ionian Islands on June 2, 1864.

Cultural life continued to blossom in Zakynthos in the years following unification; however, whereas in the years prior to the period of British rule, talented and ambitious Zakynthians would be educated in Italy and often return to the island, increasingly they would migrate to Athens. This trend accelerated in the years following unification with Greece. Arguably, over the long term this was detrimental to the cultural life of the island but it also meant that Ionian Island culture was exported to the rest of the Greek world.

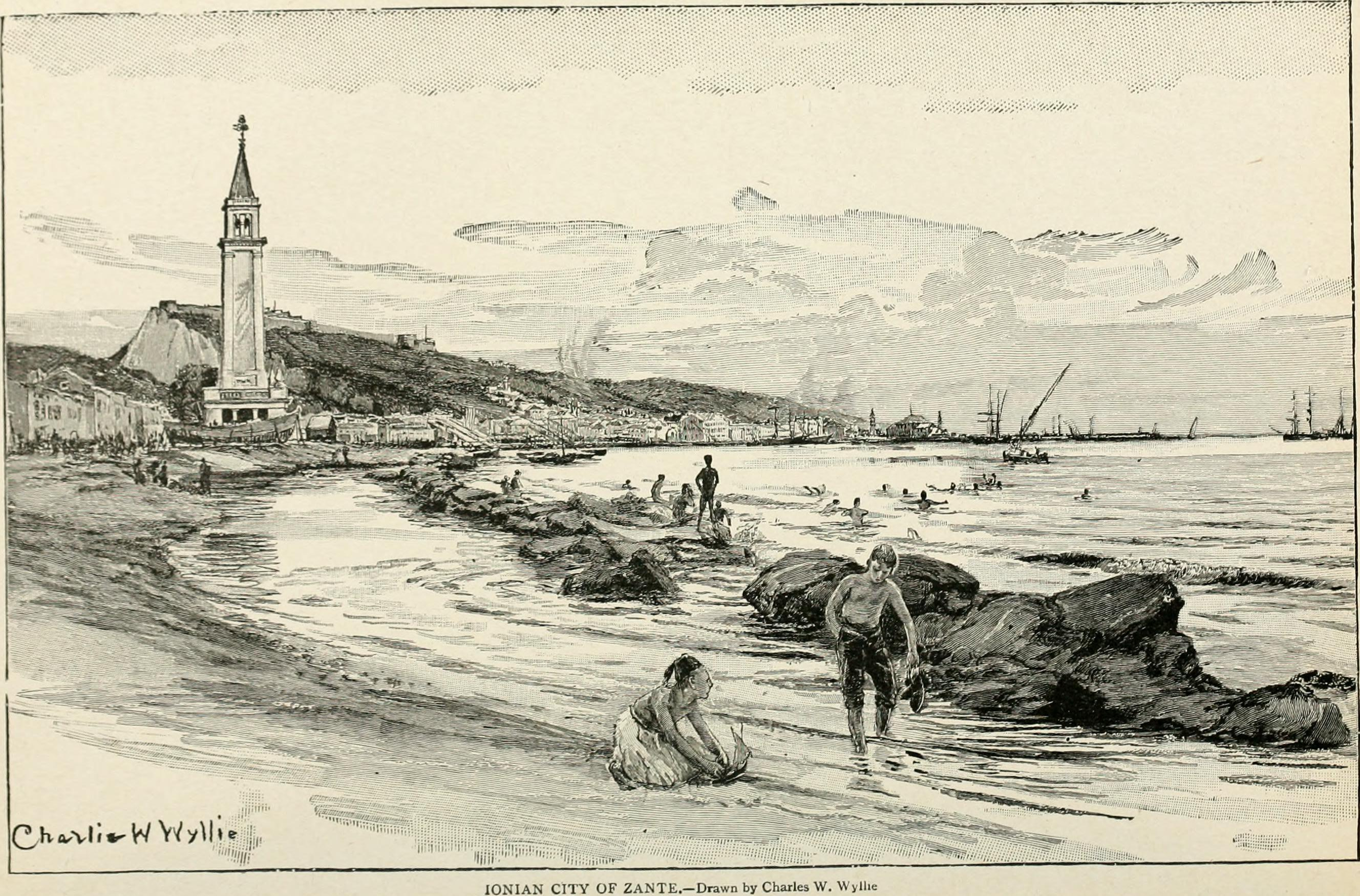
Seashore Zante 1892 by Charles W Wyllie

=== First World War (1914–1918) ===
The First World War period was dominated by two parties on Zakynthos, the Romas and the Lomvardos party. The Romas party were elected as deputies for the Liberals led by Greek prime minister, Eleftherios Venizelos whereas the Lomvardos party for the Royalists. It was not unknown for key figures in the parties to change sides. Many of the elements of the National Schism were reflected in these two local parties. The clubs situated on the island played a key role as meeting points for these two political poles but there was also rallies, agitation and reports of general tension on the streets of Zakynthos town.

Due to the National Schism and the ongoing First World War, Anglo-French forces fortified the Ionian Islands from 1915 in support of Eleftherios Venizelos and Entente. A French naval squadron landed 600 men on Zakynthos in late 1915 and also another 280 Senegalese (a French colony of the time) in early 1917. A French flag was flown over the Castle. In 1917, the French Senegalese soldiers departed and the French flag was lowered from the Castle.

The population of Zakynthos had been reduced dramatically in this period due to emigration and starvation during 1916–1917. From 49,104 inhabitants in 1906, the population was 37,340 in 1920.

=== Second World War (1940–1945) ===
Mussolini-led Italy invaded Greece in 1940 but the invasion was halted after the Greek army pushed the Italians back into Northern Epirus and some of Albania. This forced the allies of Fascist Italy, the Germans, to come to the aid of Italy. The combined forces engaged the Greek forces in 1941, Greece was then occupied by Nazi Germany. Germany occupied and administered important cities such as Athens and Thessaloniki, the Bulgarians controlled the north-eastern portion of the country, while Italy controlled the majority of the Peloponnese and the Ionian Islands.

During the Nazi occupation of Greece, Mayor Karrer and Bishop Chrysostomos refused Nazi orders to turn in a list of the members of the town's Jewish community for deportation to the death camps. Instead they hid all (or most) of the town's Jewish people in rural villages. According to some sources, all 275 Jews of Zakynthos survived the war; however, other sources state that about thirty died of starvation, or that some elderly Jews "disappeared" in a German SS truck. Statues of the Bishop and the Mayor commemorate their heroism on the site of the town's historic synagogue, destroyed in the earthquake of 1953.

The invasion and control of Corfu and the Ionian Islands, was part of Mussolini's strategy to resurrect the Roman Empire. Consequently, the Italians ruled the Ionian Islands as a separate entity from the rest of Greece with the aim of formal annexation after the war. The Italians began to implement political, social, economic, educational and cultural measures to de-Hellenise the islands. For example, the Italian political authorities forbade all communication with mainland Greece, introduced the compulsory learning of the Italian language and limited the teaching of Greek history. Additionally, the economies of the islands were re-orientated towards Italy including a new currency, tax system and application of Italian law. Concentration camps were also established in Paxos and Othoni.

The whole administration of the Ionian Islands was set up by the Central Civil Affairs Office based in Corfu with a vice governor on each island including Zakynthos with authority to issue decrees about administrative matters. The head of the Office belonged directly to the Italian Ministry of Foreign Affairs. However, very few of the proposals were implemented as the Germans were concerned of further alienating the Greek population which was already strongly opposing the Bulgarian annexations in the north-east.

In 1943, after fascism fell in Italy, the Italians surrendered and the Germans took control of the Ionian islands. The German occupation of Zakynthos lasted almost 12 months with the population suffering many depredations. As the British Marines moved in to drive out the Germans, Zakynthos was liberated in 1944.

In 1978, Yad Vashem, the Holocaust Martyrs' and Heroes' Remembrance Authority in Israel, honoured Bishop Chrysostomos and Mayor Loukas Karrer with the title of "Righteous among the Nations", an honor given to non-Jews who, at personal risk, saved Jews during the Holocaust. After the war, the Jews of Zakynthos moved either to Israel or Athens.
