= Tzanetos Grigorakis =

Greek politician, military leader and bey of Mani

Tzanetos Grigorakis Τζανέτος Γρηγοράκης

Bey of Mani
- In office 1782–1798
- Preceded by: Michalbey Troupakis
- Succeeded by: Panagiotis Koumoundouros

Personal details
- Born: 1742 Skoutari, Mani
- Died: 1813 (aged 70–71) Mavrovouni, Mani
- Children: Pierros Grigorakis; Tzortzakis Grigorakis
- Parent: Demetrios Grigorakis (father)
- Occupation: politician
- Family: Grigorakis family

Military service
- Allegiance: Mani
- Rank: Major (Russian Army)

Tzanetos "Kapetanakis" Grigorakis (Greek: Τζανέτος Καπετανάκης Γρηγοράκης; 1742–1813), also known as Zanetos or Tzanibey or Zanibey or Tzanetbey or Zanetbey, was a Greek politician, military leader ("kapetan") and the third bey of Mani, the most prominent together with Petrobey Mavromichalis. He was the longest-ruling bey of the Maniots, serving for 16 years, from 1782 to 1798.

== Family ==
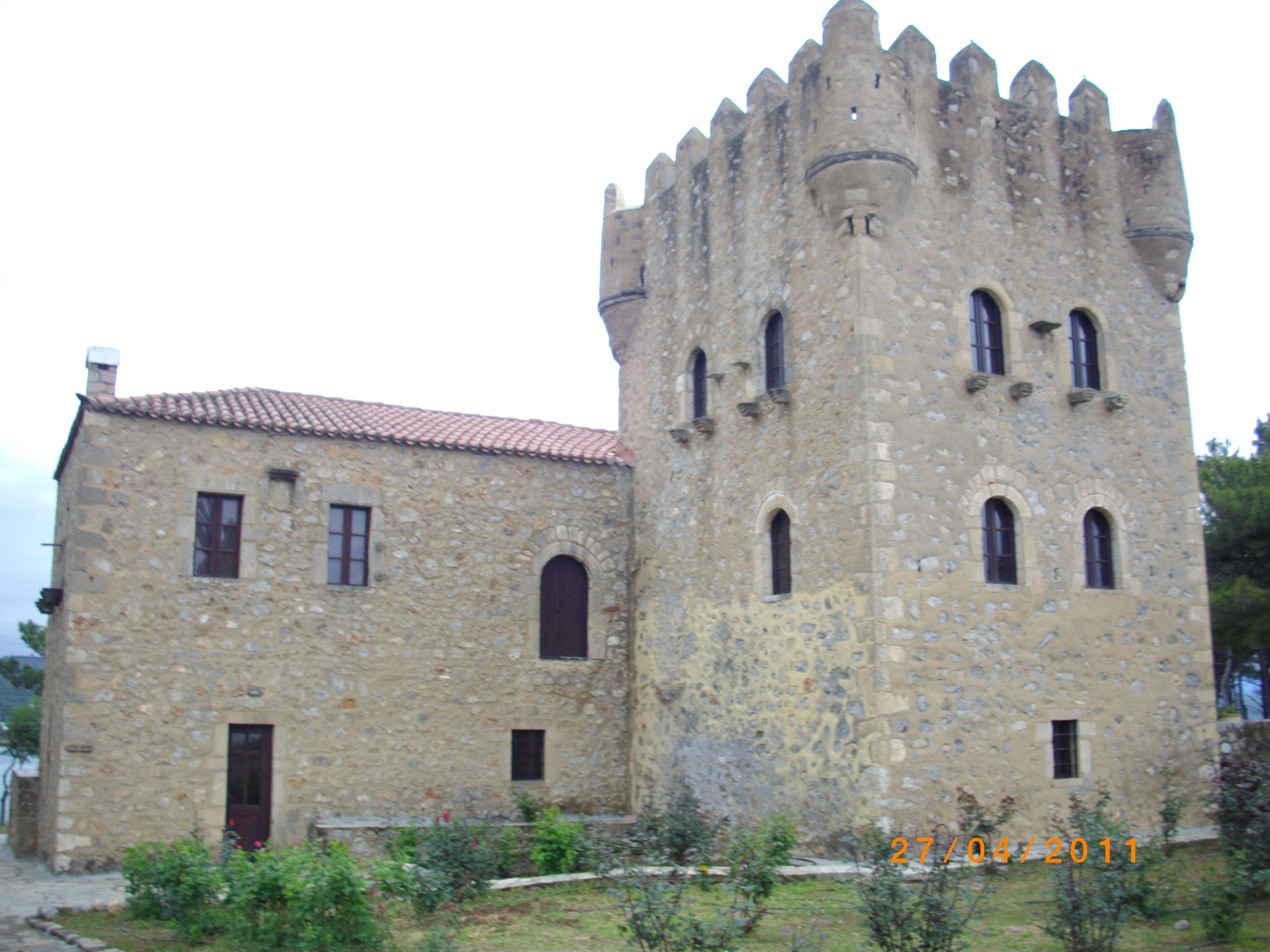
The tower in Cranae of family branch Tzannetakides

Grigorakis was born in 1742 at Skoutari of Gytheio, Laconia, and was a member of a famous Maniot family, Grigorakides, which was a leading local warrior clan. His father, Demetrios "Kapetanakis" Grigorakis, gave him the name Tzanetos or Tzannis, as the name Ioannis (Ιωάννης, John) is pronounced in Maniot dialect. Tzanetos was the father of Pierros (Πιέρρος, Peter) and Tzortzis (Τζωρτζής, George), or Tzortzakis Grigorakis, who later became the ancestor of the Tzortzakides branch. (Note: Tzortzakides are commonly known as Georgakides or Georgakianoi.) His grandson, and son of Tzortzis, Tzannetakis Grigorakis, later became the ancestor of the Tzannetakides branch.

== Early years ==
Grigorakis started the military service within his clan, as was typical in Mani. Later, in Russo-Turkish War of 1768–1774, he appeared in the Ionian Islands, together with Anagnostaras and Christoforos Perraivos, to serve with the rank of major in the Imperial Russian Army forces under the commands of the Greek-Russian general Emmanouil Papadopoulos.

=== Capture of Passavas ===
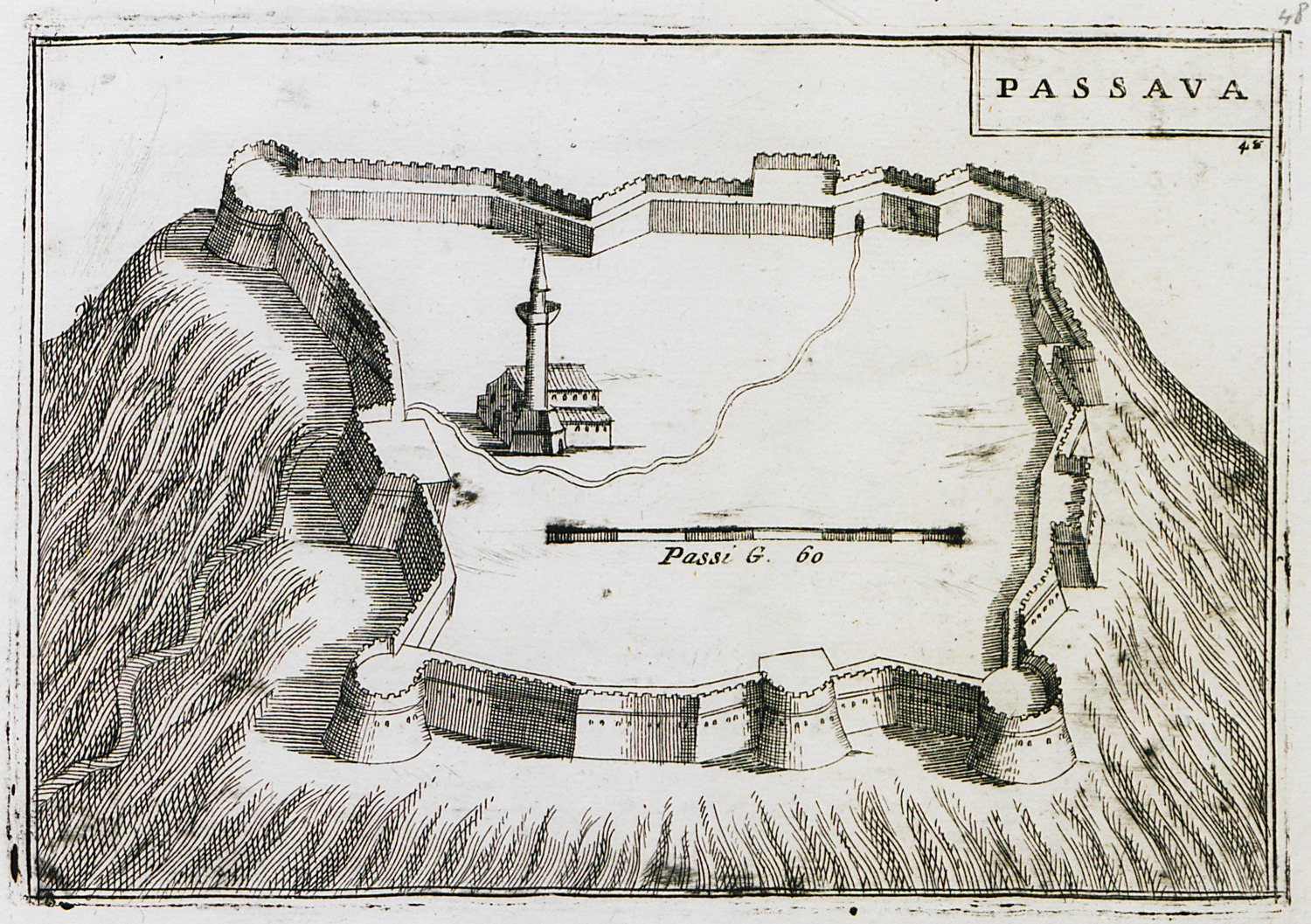
The Castle of Passavas, by Vincenzo Coronelli

Hassan Ghazi, the ruler of Tripoli, asked the Grigorakis family to accept that Tzanetos Grigorakis will take over the duties of bey and use the power of their clan to achieve peace in Mani and their neighboring areas. However, when the Grigorakis family rejected his proposal, he suggested Tzanetos Koutoufaris as Bey of Mani. Hassan Ghazi sent an envoy to the Grigorakis family leader, Exarchos Grigorakis, saying that he wanted to negotiate. The men met in Tripoli, but once Exarchos arrived, Hasan Ghazi had him seized and hanged.

When news of Exarchos's death reached Skoutari, Tzanetos Grigorakis took over the hegemony as general. Seeking revenge for Exarchos, he gathered about 3,000 Maniots who were campaigning against the Ottomans in the castle of Passavas in Las, and slaughtered 700 families. After the massacre, he expanded his territory.

== Bey of Mani ==
In 1780, in the aftermath of the Orlov Revolt and just before the Siege of Kastania, Tzanetos Grigorakis received a message with an envoy from his son-in-law Panagiotaros Venetsanakis and Konstantinos Kolokotronis to send a relief force and avoid the siege, but Grigorakis having a personal rivalry with Panagiotaros, resigned to the fact that they would have to fight alone. The refusal of support and assistance to the Kastanian chiefs (Note: Kastanian chiefs was are Klephts based in two owned towers at the village Kastania.) in 1780, objectively served the plans of Kapudan Pasha Hassan, so the Ottoman military leader did not forget it and, in 1782, Tzanetos Grigorakis became the Bey of Mani.

At first, Grigorakis refused to become a bey, but then the Dragoman of the Fleet of the Ottomans, Nikolaos Mavrogenis, the great-uncle of Manto Mavrogenous and later Prince of Wallachia, came to Gytheio (then known as Marathonisi) and kidnapped him, and he also sent as hostages to the Sultan Abdul Hamid I the two sons of Grigorakis and took him as prisoner to Spetses, where Grigorakis was forced to accept the proposal of the Ottomans.

=== Founding of Marathonisi and Mavrovouni ===
Grigorakis decided to build forts on the border line, occupying all the surrounding areas, renovating the towers or building new ones, and transferring his hegemony from Skoutari to Gytheio, where he founded Marathonisi, and also founded a new village on the nearby hill Lykovouni, which it named after the region's old name as Mavrovouni, Laconia. He also built a tower in Mavrovouni and permanently moved there after 1806.

=== Relationships with the Russians ===
Grigorakis began agreements with the Russians to help him oust the Ottomans from the Peloponnese. In 1787, with the start of the new Russo-Turkish War, Grigorakis tried to strengthen the Russians by activating the Maniates with a letter from the Russian general Dmitry Senyavin.

The Russo-Turkish War termination treaty took place in 1792, but Lambros Katsonis refused to abide by the agreement while hosted in Mani to Porto Kagio, so the Ottomans asked Grigorakis to chase him and arrest him. Katsonis was staying at Grigorakis' house in Mavrovouni, when the Ottomans learned of this and rushed to arrest him. Grigorakis alerted Katsonis to leave and hid his officers and sailors in the villages of Mani, so the Ottomans captured 11 empty ships. After 1792, the Ottomans did not trust Grigorakis, so he decided to build a castle on the hill of Mavrovouni village. In 1795 the castle was finished and named Melissi castle, also known as Castle of Mavrovouni or Goulades or Beanica or Beanka.

=== Relationships with the French ===
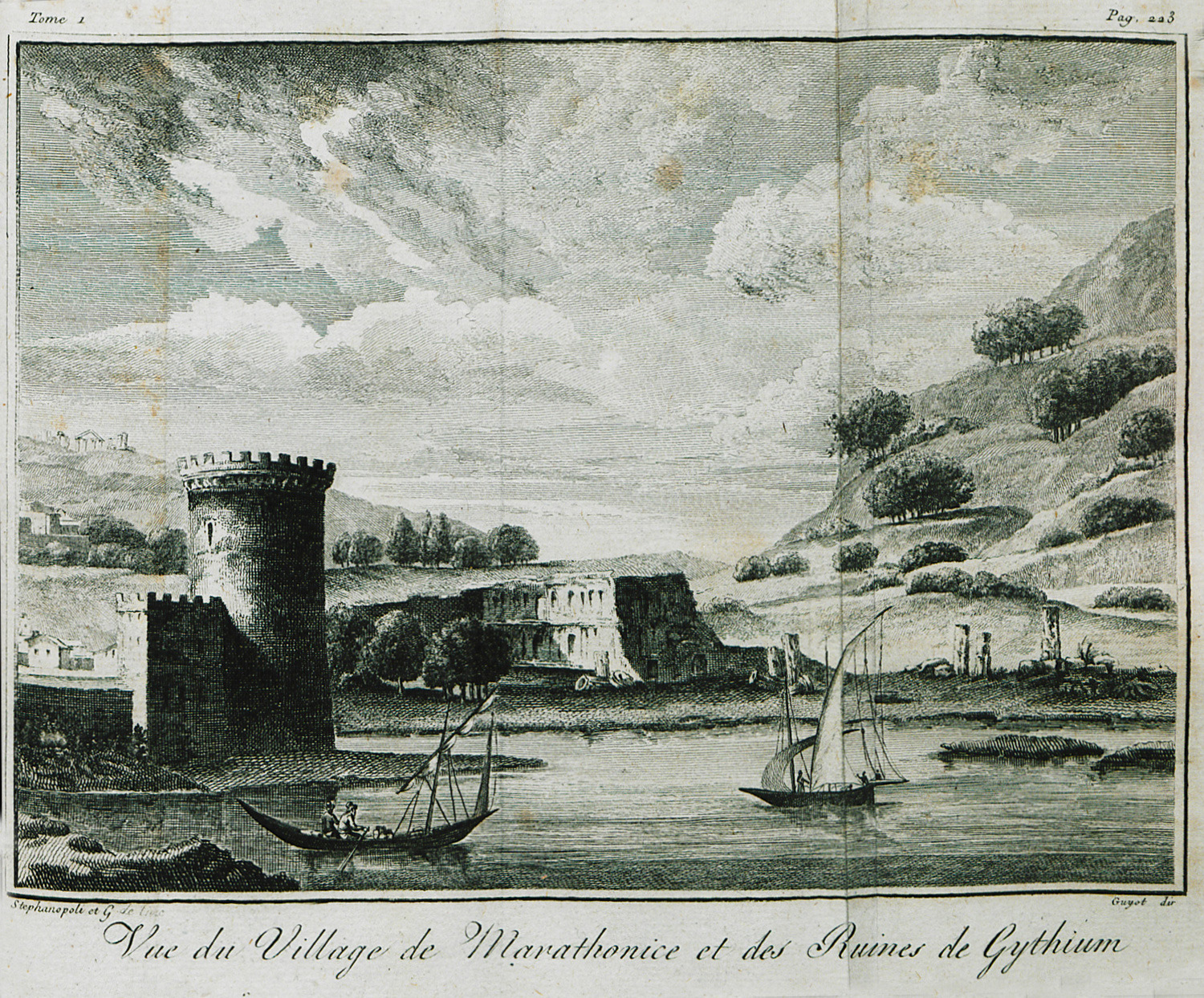
Marathonesi from the "Voyage de Dimo et Nicolo Stephanopoli en Grece" (1800)

In 1798, after the departure of the Russians, Grigorakis decided to turn to the French, sending a letter to Napoleon Bonaparte with Demetrio Stefanopoli, writing to him that he would allow the mooring and supply of French ships in Mani. Napoleon sent a reply letter with Stefanopoli, in which he accepted the agreement. Grigorakis sent to Napoleon his son Pierros Grigorakis, major of the Imperial Russian Army. Pierros fought in Italy, where he distinguished himself and was wounded, but won Napoleon's regard, who gave secret instructions to Demetrio Stefanopoli to meet all the representatives of the Greek areas, but Grigorakis suggested that Demetrio stay in Mani and safely meet everyone from there. Indeed, he did, and later, in 1801, Grigorakis was supplied with gunpowder by Napoleon.

The Ottomans soon realized that something was wrong and they decided to attack Grigorakis, sending three ships to the port to disembark strong army forces, while at the same time attacking, encircling Mani with their armies from Mystras and Vardounia. Grigorakis convened a war council, were Demetrio also participated, and decided to resist with a direct counterattack from many points with small army units. Although he had only 1,000 men at his disposal, the Ottomans suffered heavy casualties and retreated to Mystras and their ships, so the counterattack had a successful result. After this, in 1798, the Ottomans had Grigorakis replaced as bey with Panagiotis Koumoundouros.

Demetrio Stefanopoli was thrilled with Grigorakis' strategic skills and the way Maniot people fought, informing Napoleon for all these, who agreed to launch a French-Turkish war in the region, but the new bey Koumoundouros did not agree with Grigorakis and the war never happened.

== Last years ==
A second Ottoman invasion of Mani was launched in 1803, with the Melissi castle almost destroyed by cannonballs from the Ottoman fleet, because Grigorakis was supplied again with gunpowder by Napoleon, although the supplies were for Zacharias Barbitsiotis. Grigorakis resisted in the castle of Cranae, which the Ottomans could not demolish, despite the 2,000 cannonballs thrown at there, but before the Ottomans retreat, Georgios Voulgaris from Hydra gave them a plan of political victory, after he managed to take by his side the cousin of Tzanetos, Antonis Grigorakis, with the promise to appoint him as the new bey of Mani.

The Ottomans accused Koumoundouros of tolerating piracy and suspicious foreign agreements, so they replaced him with Antonis Grigorakis, now Antonbey, whom they asked to arrest Tzanetos and Pierros Grigorakis. The Ottoman troops in the area were numerous and the local Capetaneoi preferred not to take the risk to attack Antonbey, so Tzanetos fled to Zakynthos to retaliate later. However, the situation worsened when Patriarch Callinicus V and all the dignitaries turned against the clan of Grigorakis, even Antonbey, confiscating the towers and all their property. Pierros came from Paris to Zakynthos with the permission of Emmanouil Papadopoulos to gather an army under the Russian flag and campaign to Mani. As soon as the Ottomans found out this, they forgave them both and, in 1806, Tzanetos and Pierros successfully returned to Mani.

In 1813, Tzanetos Grigorakis died in his castle at Mavrovouni village.

== Sources ==
- "Grigorakis, Tzanetos". A Dictionary of Universal Biography (in Greek). Vol. 3. Athens: Ekdotike Athenon. 1983. ISBN 960-213-115-2.
- "Grēgorakēs". The History of the Greek People (in Greek). Vol. 11. Athens: Ekdotike Athenon. 1975. pp. 94–95, 408–410, 423. ISBN 978-960-213-100-8. OCLC 636806977. OL 18546042M.
- "Grēgorakēs 2.". Great Soviet Encyclopedia (in Greek). Vol. 8 (3rd: Greek ed.). Athens: Academos. 1978. p. 382. OCLC 5831425.
- Greenhalgh, P. A. L.; Eliopoulos, Edward (1985). Deep into Mani: Journey to the Southern Tip of Greece. London: Faber and Faber. ISBN 0-571-13524-2.
- Karampinis, F. & Vafas, K. (1989) [1858]. "Tzanetmpeus Kapetanakēs Grēgorakēs". Historikai alētheiai symvantōn tinōn tēs Manēs (in Greek). New York: Library of Congress.
- Roumeliotis, Ioannis (2002). Ηρωίδες της Λακωνίας και της Μάνης Όλης 1453–1944 (in Greek). Areopolis: Adouloti Mani. ISBN 978-960-87030-1-8.
- "Biography of Tzanetos Grigorakis" (in Greek). Mani Org.
- "Kastanitza-Klefturia" (in Greek). Mani Org.
- "Goulades castle". Kastra EU.
