= Mavrovouni, Laconia =

Mavrovouni Μαυροβούνι
- Village of Mani Peninsula
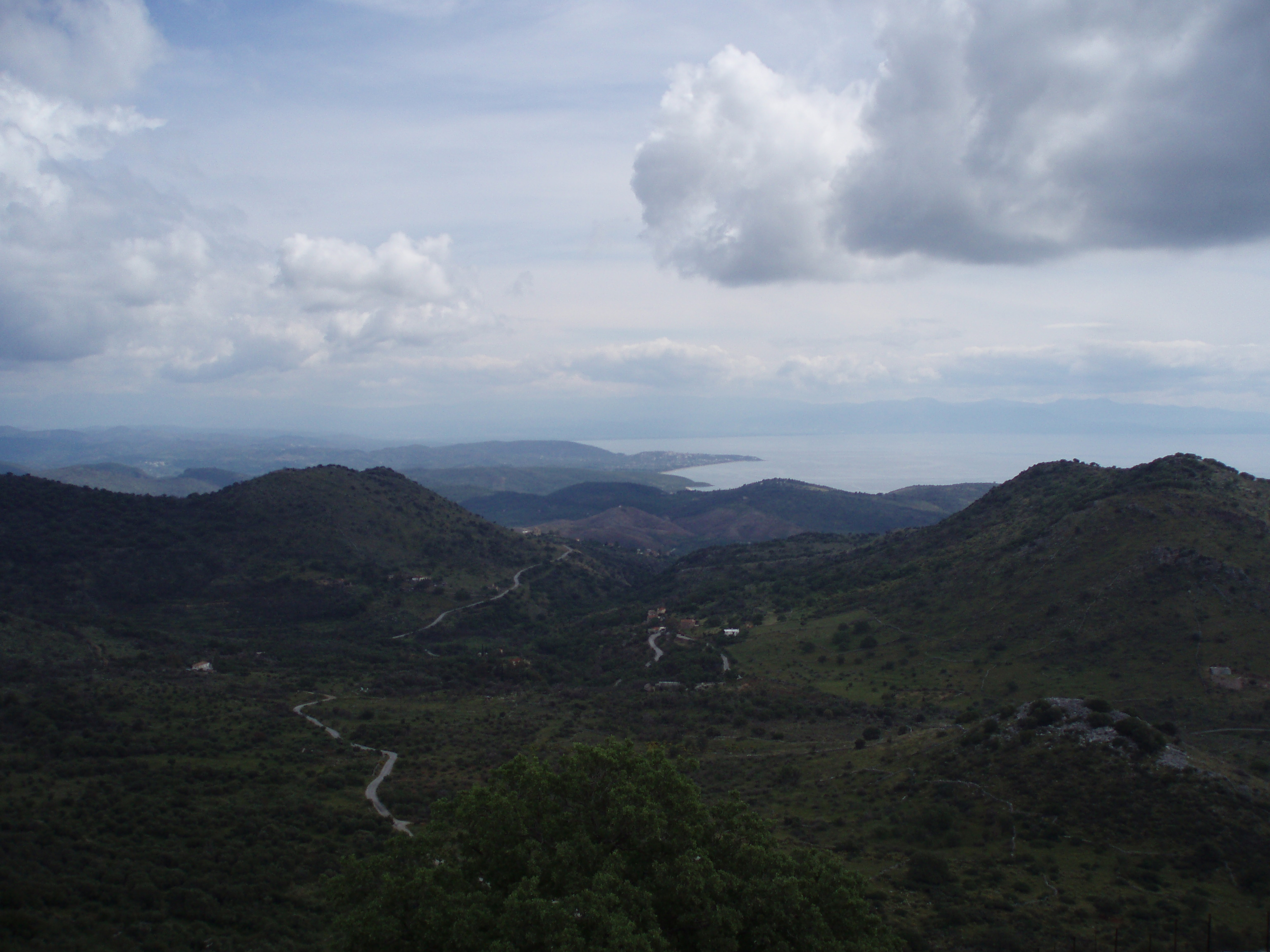
- View of Lakonikos gulf from Mavrovouni

- Location within Greece
- Coordinates: 36.7372°N 22.5675°E
- Country: Greece
- Region: Peloponnese
- Regional unit: Laconia
- Municipality: East Mani
- Settled in: E.H. period (earlier); 1782 A.D. (modern)
- Founder: Tzanetos Grigorakis (modern)
- Elevation: 90 m (300 ft)

Population (approx.)
  - Total: 500
- Time zone: UTC+2 (EET)
  - Summer (DST): UTC+3 (EEST)
- Postal code: 23200
- Area code: 27330

Mavrovouni (Greek: Μαυροβούνι, "the black mountain") is a village (population approximately 500) in the Mani Peninsula, Greece, south of Gytheio town.

== Geography ==
Mavrovouni is a village about 2 km south of the town of Gytheio, in Laconia, Greece. It is located on a steep hill of dark rock between the hill of Kumaros above Gytheio and the alluvial plain of the Vardhounia river lies a belt of low sandy hills. The district is rich in wines, olives and oranges. The village's economy is based on olive oil production, fishing and tourism.

== History ==
The hill of Mavrovouni was settled in the early Bronze Age, were Early Helladic ceramics were found here. One sherd with a cable pattern is from a pithos of a micaceous fabric found at Mavrovouni.

During the Mycenaean period (LHIII), seven chamber graves were carved into the rock on the slopes below the summit. South of it are remains of a tholos, a reference to a local prince. The Mycenaean settlement was on a hill 300 meters northeast of the graves. The sites are presented in a geographical order beginning with the Eurotas valley in the north, through the Mavrovouni valley on the Mani peninsula to the Maleas peninsula in the southeast.

The modern village of Mavrovouni settled in 1782, when Tzanetos Grigorakis became bey and built the castle Goulades on the top of the hill. The villagers, like the other Mainotes in the area, did not become Christians till the 9th century. From the 15th till the 17th century Mainotes recognized a family which claimed to belong to the Comneni of Trebizond as head chiefs. But the real power was in the hands of the chiefs of the different families and villages, who formed a turbulent and martial aristocracy.

In the course of the 18th century the Mavromichalis family established a general headship over the Mainotes, so during the Greek war of independence the Mainotes were chiefly led by Petrobey Mavromichalis, known to his countrymen as the king of Mani, who undoubtedly cherished the hope of establishing a principality for himself.

In 19th century, the area was still inhabited by autonomous Greeks as well as the Albanian tribe of Zapata; according to Thomas Gordon, this tribe inhabiting the woody hills of Mavrovouni which jut out into the promontory of Cape Pappas, and rejected every alliance proposition of Ibrahim Pasha, amidst their forests and obstinatery resisted the incursions of his troops.

== Human activities ==
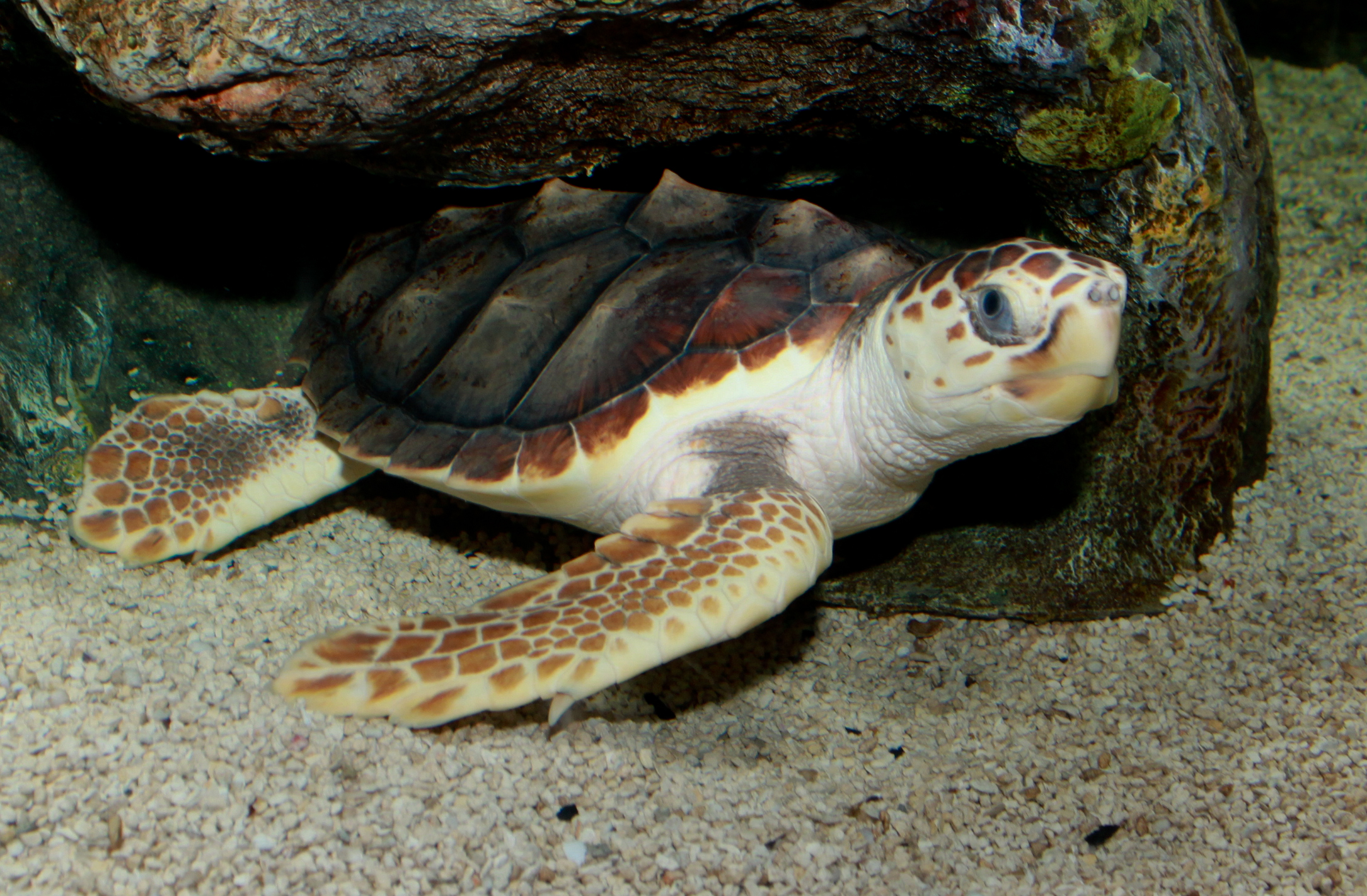
A loggerhead sea turtle

The beach of Mavrovouni is protected by an international project, as it is visited every year by the loggerhead sea turtles which commonly called Caretta-Caretta and at the beach they dig nests to lay their eggs. A loggerhead sea turtle nest roped off as part of the Sea Turtle Protection Project of Archelon.

== Sport activities ==
Mavrovouni is located right above the populated Mavrovouni beach, a place ideal for swimming and known for its size, which is approximately 5 km in length. Campings and several rooms-to-let can be found by the beach within 50–100 meters from the sea. The place is appropriate for windsurfing, having strong winds blowing for several hours in the day (12:00–18:30 UTC+3) during the summer full season (July–August).

== Sources ==
- Banou, Emilia (2000). "Middle Helladic Laconia: New evidence" (PDF). SMEA. pp. 175–199.
- Chisholm, Hugh, ed. (1911). "Maina and Mainotes" . Encyclopædia Britannica (11th ed.). Cambridge University Press.
- Gordon, Thomas (2012). History of the Greek Revolution. Vol. 2. New York: Cambridge University Press. pp. 417–418. ISBN 978-1-108-04354-0.
- Karampinis, F. & Vafas, K. (1989) [1858]. "Tzanetmpeus Kapetanakēs Grēgorakēs". Historikai alētheiai symvantōn tinōn tēs Manēs (in Greek). New York: Library of Congress.
- Waterhouse, Helen; Hope-Simpson, Robert (1961). "Prehistoric Laconia: Part II". The Annual of the British School at Athens. Vol. 56. British School at Athens. pp. 114–118. JSTOR i30096831.
  - Waterhouse, Helen; Hope-Simpson, Robert (4 October 2013). "The Annual of the British School at Athens". Prehistoric Laconia: Part II. 56. Cambridge University Press: 114–175. doi:10.1017/S0068245400013514. S2CID 140648075.
