= Demetrio Stefanopoli =

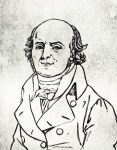
- Born: November 12, 1749; Ajaccio, Corsica
- Died: August 8, 1821 (aged 71); Paris

Demetrio Stefanopoli (12 November 1749 – 8 August 1821) was a Corsican notable and military officer in French service. A member of the Greek community of Corsica, in 1782 he received letters patent from Louis XVI recognizing him as the descendant and heir of David Komnenos, the last Emperor of Trebizond, after which he was known in French as Démétrius Stephanopoli Comnène.

== Origin and family ==
Demetrio Stephanopoli was the son of Constantino Busacci Stephanopoli, himself the son of the hereditary head of the Greek community of Paomia, a village in Corsica founded by Greeks from Vitylo in the Mani Peninsula in 1676, the same community that military leader Napoleon Bonaparte belonged to. Like the rest of the Greek community, which had sided with Genoa in the Corsican Revolution of 1729–1731, the family had lost their lands and were subsisting in Ajaccio on Constantino's salary and pension as a captain in a cavalry unit of the French army. As a result, when he died in 1772, his widow had to write to the French Minister of War for succour for herself and her offspring.

Demetrio had two brothers and a sister: Giorgio, Laura-Maria, and Giovanni-Stefano. His sister Panoria was the mother of Laure Junot, duchess d'Abrantès.

== Biography ==
To escape poverty, Constantino sent his sons to the clergy. Demetrio was enrolled in the Pontificio Collegio Urbano de Propaganda Fide c. 1768, where he remained at least until his father's death. He was never ordained, and returned to Corsica, where he worked as a forestry official, and then as a lawyer. Constantino had tried to dispute the leadership of the Greek community with his cousin, Georges-Marie Stephanopoli, but the French had recognized the latter as its head in 1769.

Georges-Marie advocated the establishment of a new Greek settlement at Cargèse (close to the site of Paomia), a project which Constantino and Demetrio vehemently opposed on various grounds, for fear of losing their traditional influence. Demetrio also came into conflict with the French authorities, who insisted that the lands allocated to the Greek community in Cargèse were to be equally distributed among its members. The Stefanopoli, who had been major landowners, refused to accept this, and requested a compensation, in vain. Demetrio's in violent opposition to the Cargèse project led to his exile for three months to Bonifacio. In 1776, he joined his sister and her husband in Paris, where they pressured the French court on the matter of the compensation. They had mixed success: on 16 January 1777, the King accorded the family a huge estate at Coti-Chiavari. At 3,000 arpents, it was about 150 times the size of the land allocated to the other Greeks at Cargèse. However, it was marshy and not very productive, despite Demetrio's repeated and costly attempts to make it profitable.

In 1779, he secured a brevet as a cavalry captain, under the name of Démétrius Stephanopoli Comnène, des Protogeros de Lacédémone. The second part of this title referred to his family's origin from Mani in the Peloponnese, where their ancestors had been headsmen (protogeros, lit. 'first elder'). His claim to the surname Comnène, referring to the Komnenos dynasty of the Byzantine Empire, first appears in this document, but it apparently reflects a well-established tradition: in his Istoria del Regno di Corsica, the Florentine historian Gioacchino Cambiagi devoted an entire chapter (Vol. XII, pp. 287–312) to the family's descent from Alexios I Komnenos, and its subsequent history, drawn in part from oral accounts of the Greeks of Corsica. The family claimed descent from a supposed "Nikephoros Komnenos", the youngest son of the last Emperor of Trebizond, David Komnenos (r. 1459–1461), who had allegedly been sent to safety with his cousin, Despina Khatun, and then settled in Mani and became a protogeros there. However, no son of such name is known for the emperor, who was executed along with his sons in November 1463 by the Ottoman sultan Mehmed II. The modern genealogist of the Komnenian dynasty, Konstantinos Varzos, dismissed Stefanopoli's claims as fiction.

In 1781, Demetrio submitted his genealogy to the royal genealogist, and in April 1782, King Louis XVI recognized his claim to the surname. In accordance with his new status, he was given the right to mount the royal carriage, and his marriage contract in 1785 was signed by the royal family. His wife, Mlle Edmée Marie de la Chaussée de Boucherville, was presented to the royal court by none other than the Countess of La Tour d'Auvergne.

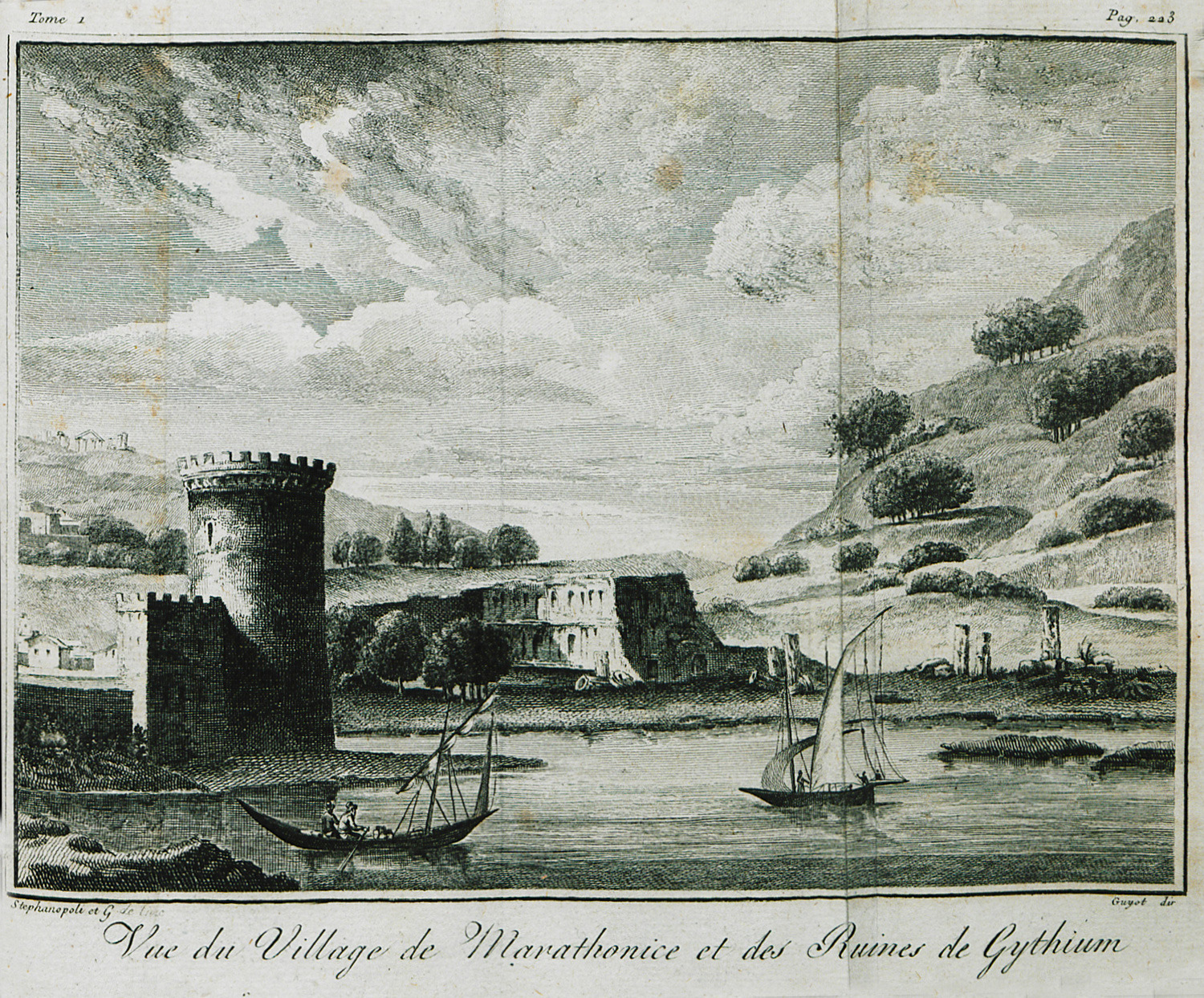
View of Marathonisi and the ruins of Gytheion in Mani, from his 1800 work Voyage en Grèce

Following the French Revolution, he initially joined the counter-revolutionary Army of Condé. Following the French conquest of Italy in 1796–1797, he was employed by Napoleon Bonaparte in his schemes to exploit the Greek aspirations for independence from the Ottoman Empire; Napoleon sent Stefanopoli as his agent to Greece in 1797, and reportedly even considered him as a potential candidate for the Greek throne. The French invasion of Egypt put an end to Napoleon's plans for a Greek insurrection, and Stefanopoli returned to France, where he published his Voyage en Grèce in 1800.

With the Bourbon Restoration, Louis XVIII named him maréchal de camp. He died childless at Paris on 8 August 1821. His younger brother Giorgio and then his nephew, Adolphe de Geouffre, were his heirs.

== Writings ==
- Démètre Stephanopoli de Comnène, Notes archéologiques, Ajaccio, 1841
- Démètre Stephanopoli de Comnène, Précis d'histoire de la maison de Comnène, Paris
- Voyage de Dimo et Nicolo Stephanopoli en Grèce, Paris, an VIII

== Sources ==
- Comnène, Marie-Anne (1959). Cargèse: une colonie grecque en Corse (in French). Les Belles lettres. ISBN 9782251332048.
- Comnène, Prince Georges (1831). Sur la Grèce (in French). Paris: Imprimerie de Firmin Didot Frères.
- Nick, Nicholas (2005). "A History of the Greek Colony of Corsica". Journal of the Hellenic Diaspora. 31 (1): 33–78. hdl:10066/13141.
- Rousseau, Hervé (1966). "La duchesse d'Abrantès, Napoléon et les Comnène". Revue des Deux Mondes (in French): 44–52. JSTOR 44592112.
- Trapp, Erich; Beyer, Hans-Veit; Walther, Rainer; Sturm-Schnabl, Katja; Kislinger, Ewald; Leontiadis, Ioannis; Kaplaneres, Sokrates (1976–1996). Prosopographisches Lexikon der Palaiologenzeit (in German). Vienna: Verlag der Österreichischen Akademie der Wissenschaften. ISBN 3-7001-3003-1.
- Varzos, Konstantinos (1984). Η Γενεαλογία των Κομνηνών [The Genealogy of the Komnenoi] (PDF) (in Greek). Vol. B. Thessaloniki: Centre for Byzantine Studies, University of Thessaloniki.
