= Hope Simpson =

Hope Simpson may refer to:

- Hope Simpson Enquiry, 1929
- Port Hope Simpson, a town in Newfoundland and Labrador, Canada

== People with the name ==
- John Hope Simpson (1868-1961), British politician
- Robert Edgar Hope-Simpson (20th century), general practitioner
