= GYT =

GYT may refer to:

- Gimnasia y Tiro, an Argentine football club
- Guyana Time
- Tochigi Television, a television station in Tochigi Prefecture, Japan
