= Marathonisi =

Island near Zakynthos, Greece

Coordinates: 37°41′05″N 20°52′15″E

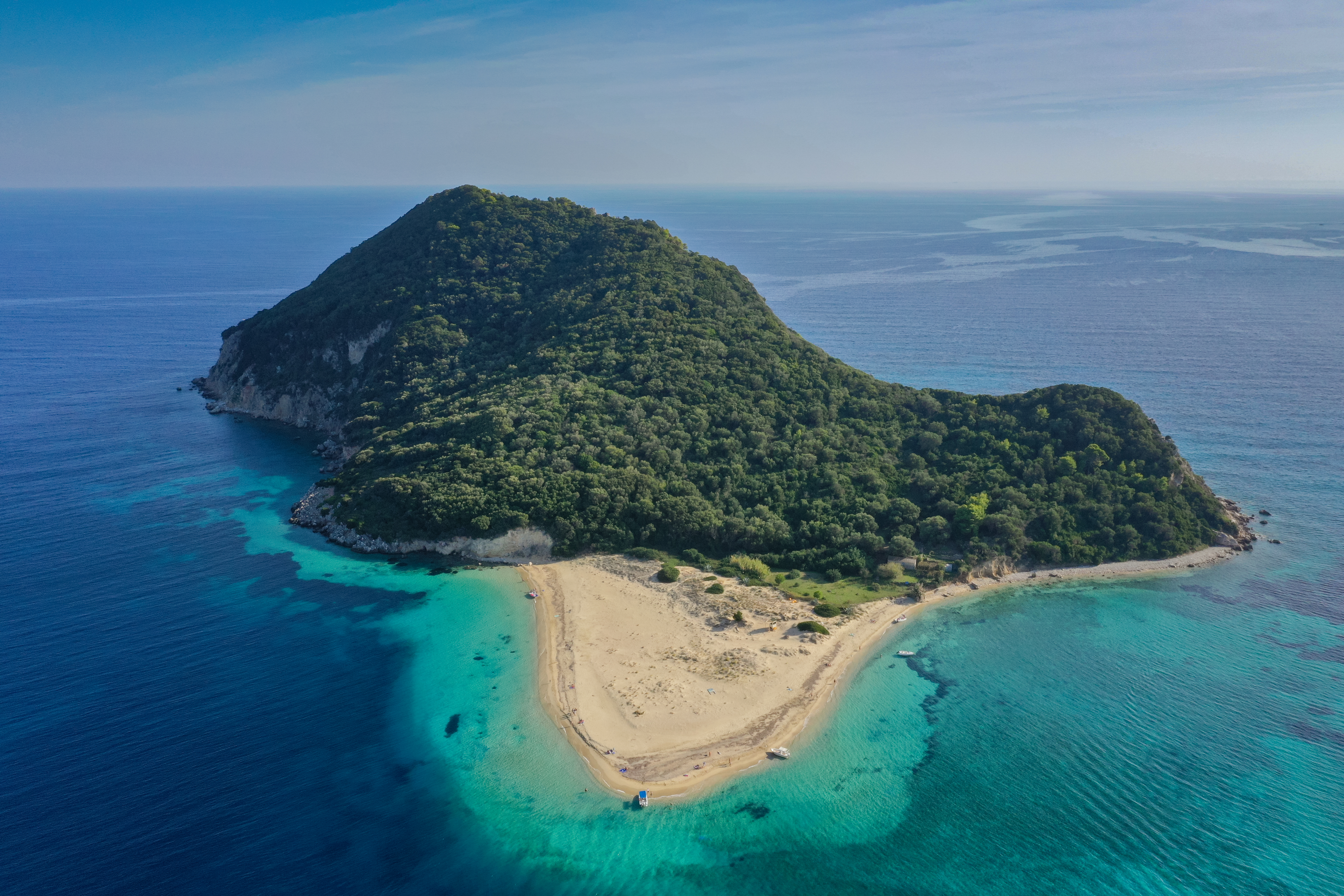
Marathonisi Island Zakynthos, Greece

Marathonisi (Greek: Μαραθονήσι/Μαραθωνήσι) is a small uninhabited island off Zakynthos in western Greece. The island was inhabited until the Second World War, but now is part of the Zakynthos National Marine Park, protected under the Natura 2000 program. It is a reproduction site for the Caretta caretta sea turtle.
