= Zacharias Barbitsiotis =

Greek revolutionary

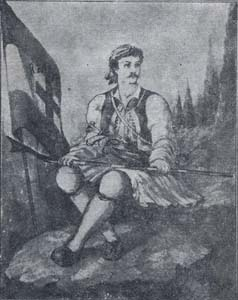
Kapetan Zacharias (1759–1804)

Zacharias Pantelakos (Greek: Ζαχαριάς Παντελάκος; 22 October 1759 – 20 July 1804), nicknamed Barbitsiotis (Greek: Μπαρμπιτσιώτης) but more commonly known as Kapetan Zacharias (Greek: Καπετάν Ζαχαριάς), was a Greek klepht in the Peloponnese during the last decades of Ottoman rule over Greece. He is described by Kyriakos Kassis as the best klepht of Taygetus.

== Early life and career ==
Zacharias "Barbitsiotis" Pantelakos was born on 22 October 1759 in the town of Varvitsa, Laconia, though his family originated from Mani. His father's name was Theodoros Pantelakos and his mother's name was unknown. In 1775, his brother Pantelis, was murdered by the Turks. Zacharias, wanting revenge, went to the town of Loggastra in northern Laconia where he joined a band of klephts under the command of kapetan (chieftain) Mantzaris.

The next year during the Battle of Rekitsa, Zacharias charged at the Turks without orders. The other klephts followed him and they chased after the Turks. This incident won Zacharias recognition from his comrades for his bravery. However, Mantzaris was angry with Zacharias as he had not followed orders and Zacharias left and founded his own group of sixty men under his own flag.

Zacharias' fame grew even more when he defeated the Turks at the Battle of Salesi in Arcadia. Kontakis, who was the leader of the village of Agios Petros in Arcadia, and who was at first an enemy and later a friend of Zacharias, described in his memoirs:

There are many things about him to describe, and during his era he was constantly fighting tyranny. One would need to write a whole book about it. Kapetan Zaharios was very fast, with a flexible body, average height, strong back, round and handsome face, brown eyes and a scar above his upper right eyebrow, which made him even more handsome. His hair was brown and curly. He had a strong and powerful voice, with a strong will. He was very independent, in which he would never submit to anyone and would never recognize anyone superior to him. He would also never carry money or a wallet wherever he went.

In 1792, the renowned klepht captain Androutsos – father of Odysseas Androutsos – was expelled by the Turks from his base in Aegina and escaped on the ship of Lambros Katsonis, an equally renowned pirate captain. They landed in Mani, where they were greeted by Zacharias and a young Theodoros Kolokotronis, and took him to his base.

In terms of alliances, Zacharias formed the Armatoliki Omospondia (Armatoloi Federation) around 1786–1804, uniting disparate klepht and armatoloi bands across the Peloponnese into a coordinated network that amplified their collective power against Ottoman authority. He consolidated authority by forging unity among fragmented Peloponnesian klepht groups, often mediating feuds to prioritize anti-Ottoman actions. By the early 1800s, he had assumed a commanding role, signing documents as "Commander-in-Chief of the Peloponnese" – reflecting his ascent to regional preeminence among irregular fighters who evaded Ottoman control in the mountains – with Theodoros Kolokotronis and Petimezas serving as key deputies, which not only secured privileges for local fighters but also elevated national morale through structured collaboration. His leadership emphasized mobility and surprise, drawing followers through proven successes rather than formal rank. His inner circle included prominent klephts such as Nikitas Tringas, Stametelos Tourkolekas (father of Nikitaras), Anagnostaras, Panagiotis Kefalas, Ramogiannis, and Ilias Margeliotis, forming a core of loyal fighters for joint operations. For specific raids, he allied with Maniot figures like Andreas Tsakonis and Dimitris Kalliantzis, utilizing their seafaring expertise to execute hybrid land-sea assaults. This federation represented a rare attempt at klephtic unity, though internal rivalries and Ottoman countermeasures eventually strained it, culminating in Zacharias appointment as Dervenokapetan (governor of the defiles) by the Porte in 1797 after repelling a conspiracy at Agrilovouni.

== Death ==
In 1804, the Turks extended their efforts to capture Zacharias as well as the former Bey of Mani, Tzanetos Grigorakis, who retreated to the mountains after being deposed and after the events of the 1803 Ottoman Invasion of Mani. The reason for this increased interest into Zacharias' capture was because it had been revealed that together with Tzanetos and other prominent Maniots, he had been conspiring with Napoleon Bonaparte, who had sent them French weapons. In charge of the attempt to capture Zacharias was Seremet, who had been instructed to capture Zacharias and hand him over to the higher authorities.

Seremet, knowing that capturing Zacharias without any casualties was nearly impossible, decided to assassinate him. The Turks approached a Maniot by the name of Koukeas and organised the assassination attempt with him. Koukeas went to Zacharias and told him that a Turkish fleet had appeared off Kitries. When Zacharias went to investigate this himself, he was assassinated near Kardamyli.

== Sources ==
- Kyriakos Kassis, (1979). Mani's History. Athens: Presoft
- Σαράντος Ι. Καργάκος (1998). Ζαχαριάς Μπαρμπιτσιώτης – Ο Δάσκαλος της Κλεφτουριάς: Θρύλος και Πραγματικότητα. Αθήνα: Εκδόσεις Ι. Σιδέρης.
- Δούκας Χ. Παναγιώτης (1922). Η Σπάρτη δια μέσου των αιώνων. Νέα Υόρκη: Εθνικός Κήρυξ.
- Roumelioti, Poti. "Kapetan Zaharias".
- Kostaras, Nikos (2016). "Ναυτική Μεγαλόπολη – Μέρος 6ο" (in Greek).
