= National Marine Park of Zakynthos =

National park in Greece

- IUCN category II (national park)
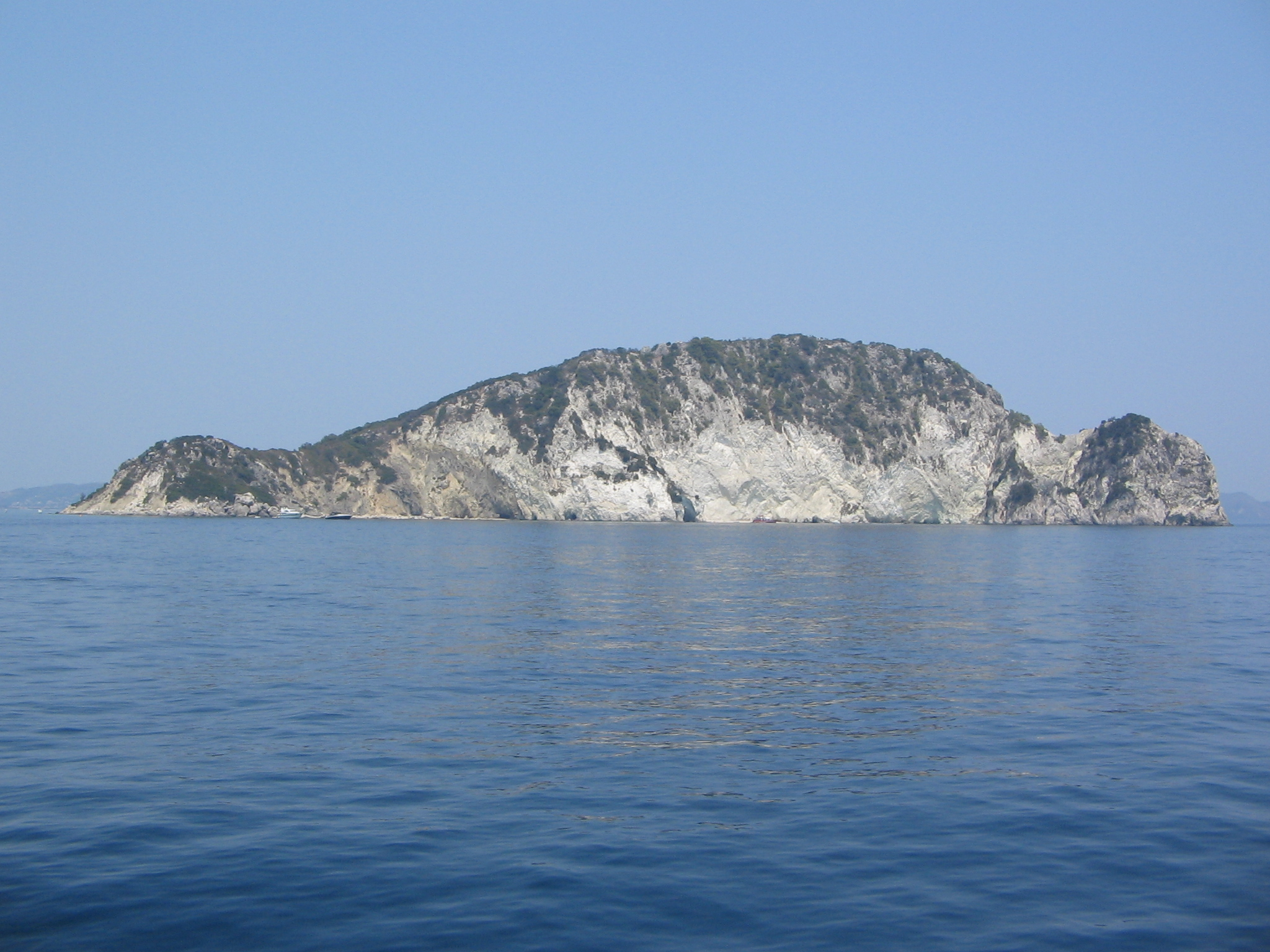
- Marathonissi islet

- Location within Greece
- Interactive map of National Marine Park of Zakynthos
- Location: Zakynthos, Greece
- Nearest city: Patras
- Coordinates: 37°42′18″N 20°53′18″E
- Area: 135 square kilometres (52 sq mi)
- Established: December, 1999
- Governing body: joint venture between ministries

The National Marine Park of Zakynthos (Greek: Εθνικό Θαλάσσιο Πάρκο Ζακύνθου), founded in 1999, is a national park located in Laganas bay, in Zakynthos island, Greece. The park, part of the Natura 2000 ecological network, covers an area of 135 square kilometres (52 sq mi) and is the habitat of the loggerhead sea turtle (Caretta caretta). It is the first national park established for the protection of sea turtles in the Mediterranean.

== Geography ==
Zakynthos Marine Park encompasses the marine area of the Bay of Laganas, on the southern shores of the island of Zakynthos, and hosts one of the most important sea turtle nesting beaches in the Mediterranean. The nesting habitat in the bay comprises six discrete beaches: Gerakas, Daphni, Sekania, Kalamaki, E. Laganas and Marathonissi islet, totalling about 5 km (3 mi) in length, of which Sekania is rated amongst the world's highest loggerhead nesting concentrations. Apart from the nesting areas the park encompasses the wetland of Keri Lake and the two small islands of Strofadia, which are located 50 km (31 mi) south from the island of Zakynthos.

The marine park is composed of three marine zones (A, B, C) in the Bay of Laganas, in addition to the strictly protected nesting areas, as well as the terrestrial and peripheral zone. For the protection of the ecosystem, fishing activities are strictly prohibited inside each of the marine zones.

== Biology ==
The area is home to the endangered loggerhead sea turtle (Caretta caretta), which is considered one of the oldest forms of life on planet. The marine park hosts annually 900 to 2,000 nests, which represents an average of eighty percent of the nest total of Mediterranean loggerhead population. The loggerhead spends most of its life at sea, but females lay their eggs on Laganas bay at night from May to August.

Furthermore, the area is characterised by a variety of habitats of interest including sand dunes, Posidonia oceanica beds, the critically endangered sea daffodil (Pancratium maritimum), submerged reefs, as well as hundreds of species of flora and fauna, some of which are of great importance. A resident population of the critically endangered species of monk seal, Monachus monachus is present at the west coast of Zakynthos.

== Park management ==
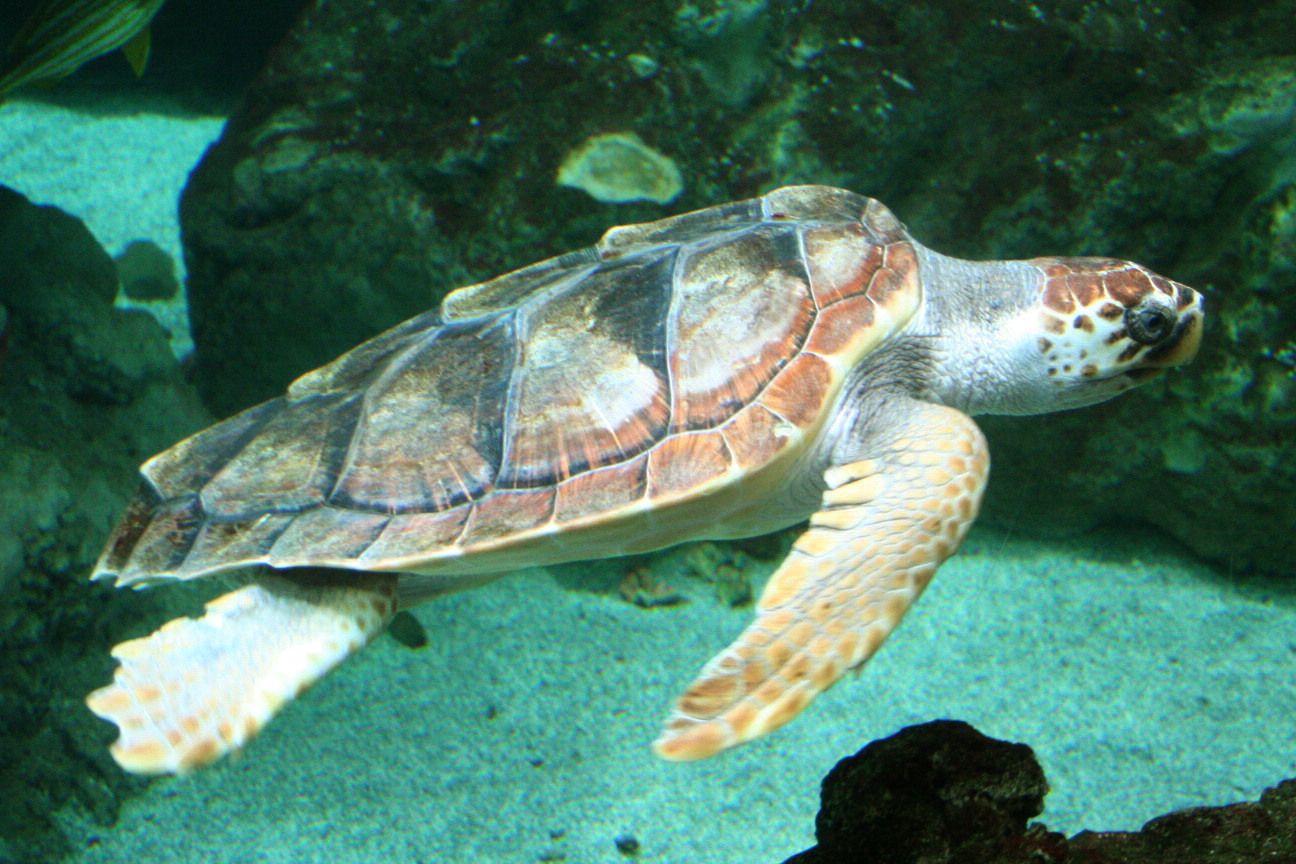
Underwater picture of a loggerhead sea turtle (Caretta caretta).

The recent rapid development of the local tourism industry is seen as a potential threat for the protected area's existence. Moreover, the annual migration of the loggerhead sea turtle to their nesting grounds has become increasingly risky due to the obstacles encountered on beaches. In addition speedboats, in violation of the boating ban off nesting beaches are another factor that endangered the turtles' lives. For this reason the National Marine Park of Zakynthos was established, in December 1999, aiming at the protection and the preservation of Caretta caretta and other species such as the Mediterranean monk seal Monachus monachus, as well as several other important species of animals, birds, amphibians and flora found in this area.

Furthermore, in order to achieve the objective of active public participation, a bottom-up approach was adopted for the implementation of actions dealing with monitoring and surveillance, accreditation, certification and collaboration with local stakeholders. This approach contributed to the formulation of a common vision for the long term management of the natural as well as economic parameters. Moreover, the elaboration of a code of conduct for ecotourism activities aims to harmonize tourism strategy with sustaining the biodiversity and the cultural authenticity of area. Beyond the general principles, specific codes of conduct were elaborated which concern sightseeing, general awareness activities, rambling activities and marine excursions.

== See also ==
- National Marine Park of Zakynthos
- ARCHELON, the Sea Turtle Protection Society of Greece
- Ionian Islands
- Tourism in Greece
