= Dimitrios (shipwreck) =

Picturesque shipwreck near Gythio, Greece

Coordinates: 36°47′20.38″N 22°35′9.04″E

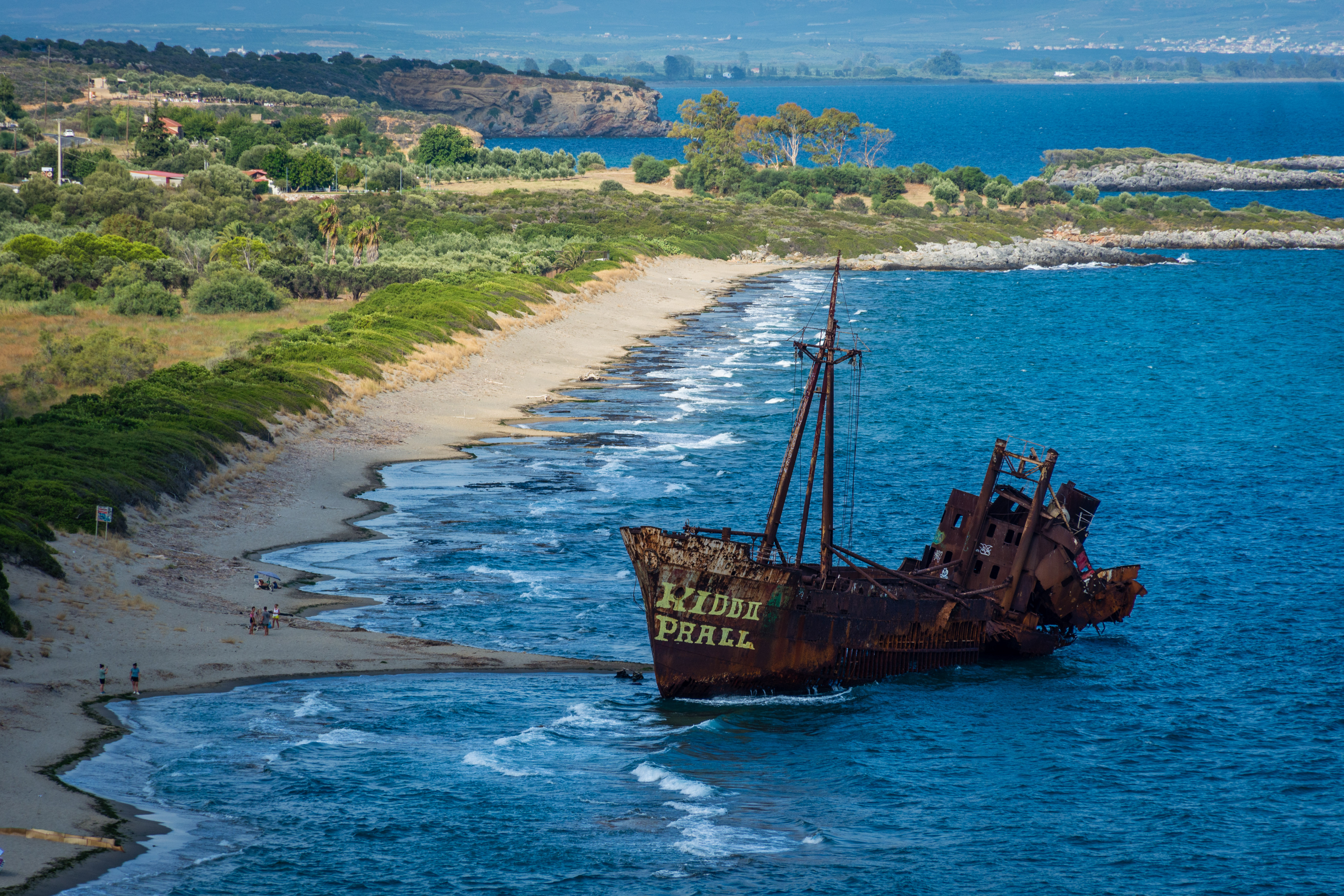
Dimitrios wreckage, summer 2023

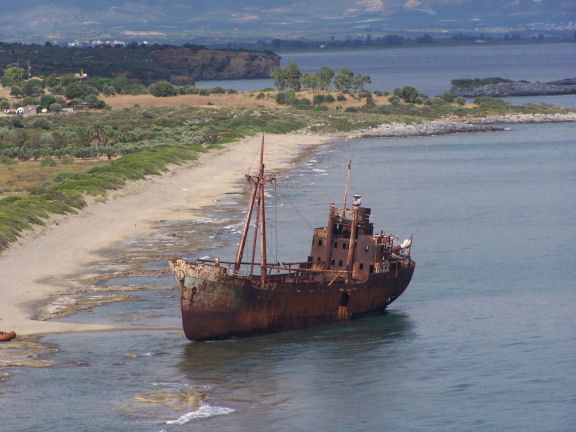
The Dimitrios shipwreck on Valtaki beach, near Gythio.

Dimitrios (Greek: Δημήτριος) is a Greek shipwreck famous due to its picturesque location on an easily accessible sandy beach near Gythio, Greece.

Dimitrios (previously named Klintholm), a small, 67-metre (220 ft) cargo ship of 965 gross register tons cargo capacity built in Denmark in 1950, was registered in the Prefecture of Piraeus, registration no. 2707. The ship belonged 76.75% to the Molaris Brothers (Αφοί Μόλαρη) and 23.25% to the Matsinos Brothers (Αφοί Ματσινού). Dimitrios has been stranded on the beach at Valtaki (Βαλτάκι) in today's Evrotas municipality in the prefecture of Laconia, Greece, since 23 December 1981.

There are many rumors about the ship's origins and how it got stranded on the beach. Most relate that the ship was used to smuggle cigarettes between Turkey and Italy. She was seized by the port authorities of Gythio and then deliberately released from the port and left to be dragged by the sea to the beach at Valtaki, about 5 kilometres (2.7 nmi; 3.1 mi) from the port of Gythio. She was then set on fire to hide the evidence of cigarette smuggling. Another, less common rumor speaks of a ghost ship of unknown origins.

== History of the shipwreck ==
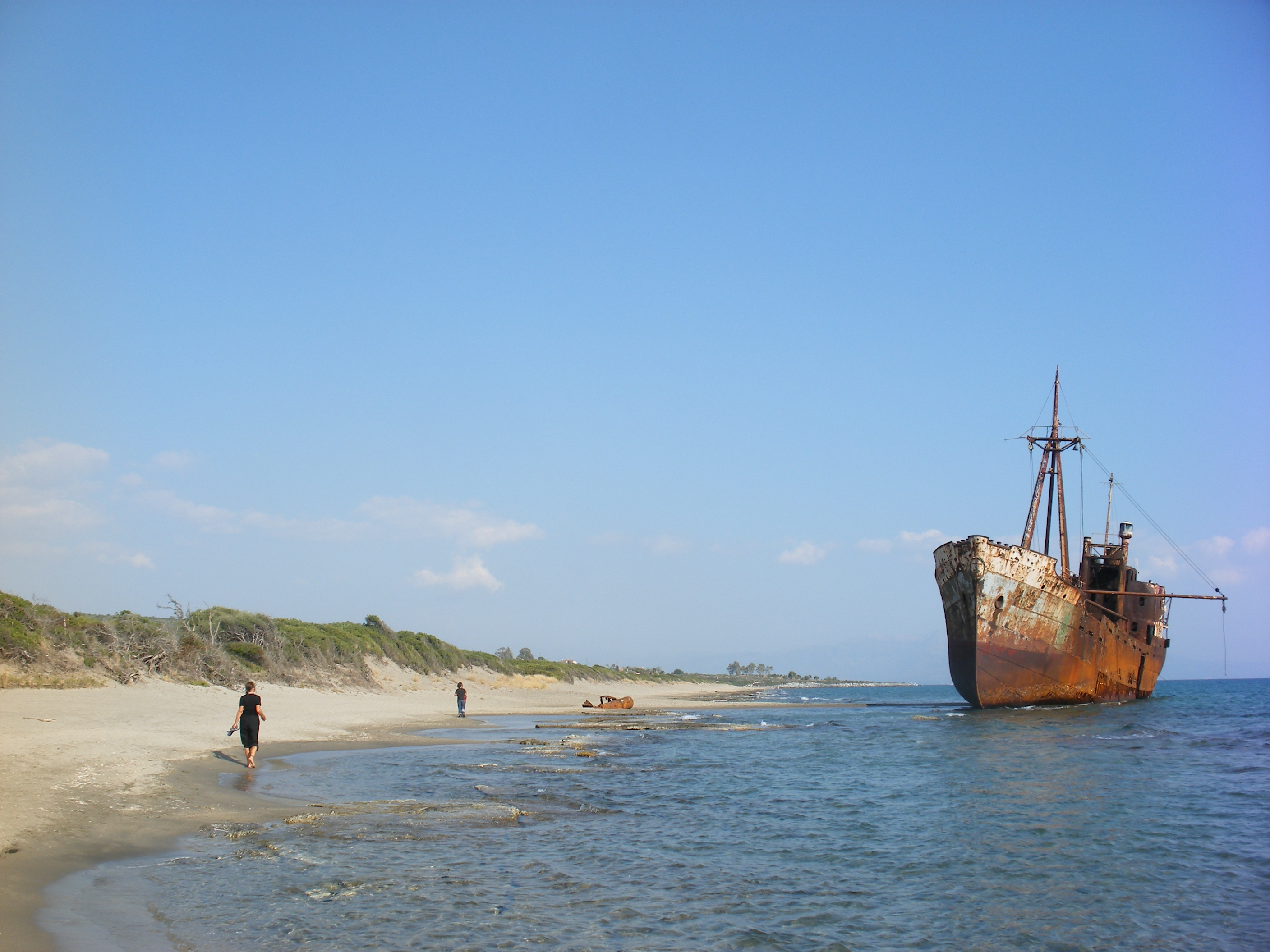
The Dimitrios in 2008.

According to the former Chief of the Hellenic Coast Guard, Vice Admiral Christos Dounis (1935–2010), in his Τα ναυάγια στις ελληνικές θάλασσες (The shipwrecks of the Greek seas) the ship made an emergency docking at Gythio on 4 December 1980 because her captain needed access to a hospital due to a serious illness. However, after the ship's docking, financial problems arose with the crew, as did various engine problems, coupled with insurance measures imposed by various lenders. The crew was then fired and the task of safeguarding the ship was assigned to Georgios Daniil and Vasilis Parigoris.

The ship was docked at Gythio until June 1981, when she was declared unsafe due to wear on the docking ropes and starboard list due to water entering her hull. The port authorities asked for her to be moved to an anchorage outside the port for safety reasons, but the owners did not respond until November 1981. The book states that "at approximately 12:30 p.m. on 9 November 1981 the ship was swept about 2 [nautical?] miles [2.3 miles; 3.7 km] away due to severe weather conditions and it was temporary anchored". But the temporary anchorage did not last for long, as the ship was swept away again and finally stranded at its current location on the beach at Valtaki on 23 December 1981. The ship was then simply abandoned there and no attempts were made to recover her.
