= ARCHELON, the Sea Turtle Protection Society of Greece =

Greek environmental organization

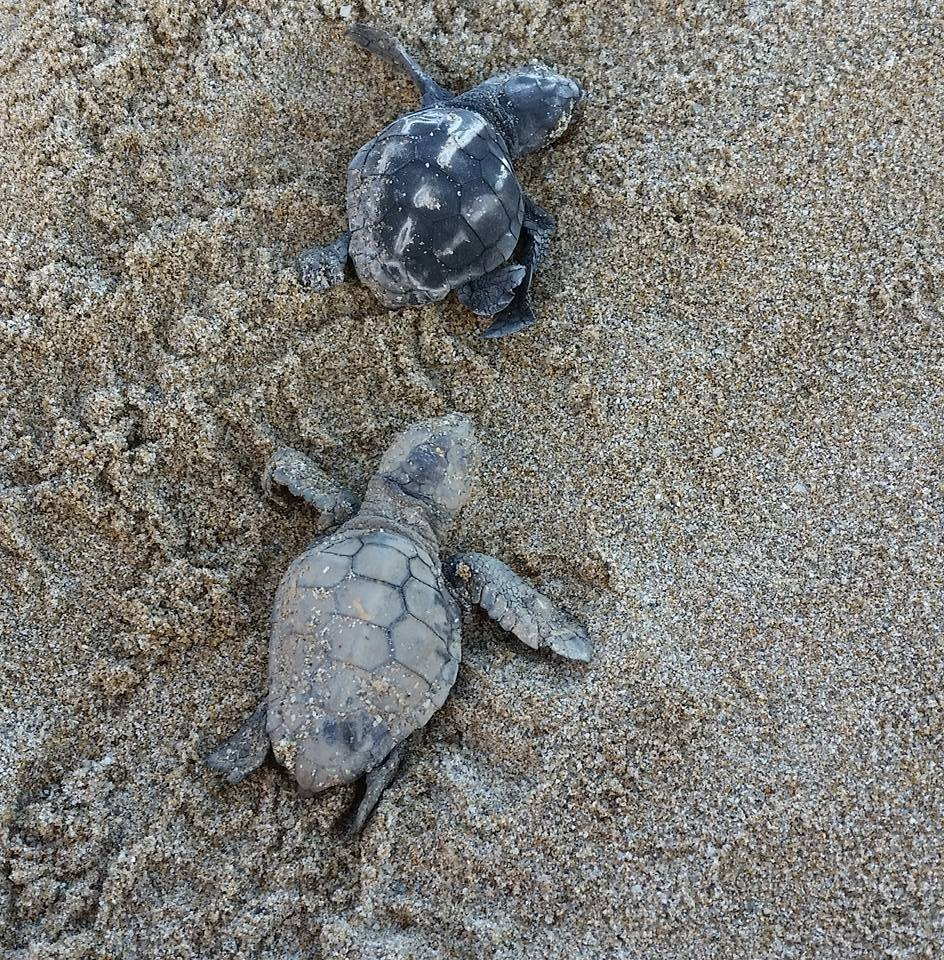
Hatchlings from the Archelon project in Crete.

ARCHELON, the Sea Turtle Protection Society of Greece is a Greek environmental organization. It was founded in 1983. It aims to protect sea turtles and their habitats in Greece through research, public awareness campaigns, restoring habitats, and through its rescue centre, built in 1994.

== Overview ==
ARCHELON is a partner to the UNEP Mediterranean Action Plan, and is hosting the 2006 International Sea Turtle Conference. Despite working with major national and international bodies, ARCHELON relies heavily on the work of volunteers, of which there are some 400 each year.

They state that due to their work:

- Every year over 2,500 nests are protected against human threats, predation and sea inundation.
- Nearly 4,000 turtles have been tagged in order to monitor their movements in the sea. Recently satellite transmitters have been used.
- Over 50 injured or sick turtles are treated every year at the Rescue Centre at Glyfada (Athens).
- Three permanent and 10 seasonal stations are operated by ARCHELON on Zakynthos, Peloponnesus and Crete.
- About 200,000 tourists are directly contacted through ARCHELON's diverse programmes every year
- Over 13,000 students participate every year in the educational programmes

The rescue centre is currently undergoing development and expansion, and an emergency turtle first-aid centre was built in 2005, on Crete. In 2004, as Athens hosted the Olympic games resulted in a tight financial situation for Greece nationally, which resulted in cuts in its environmental services, which included the closure of the National Marine Park of Zakynthos, a move strongly contested by ARCHELON and its members, who prepared a petition.

== Field projects ==
ARCHELON run a total of 7 long term field projects on loggerhead sea turtle (Caretta caretta), nesting beaches around Greece. These projects run for the majority of the nesting and hatching season, from mid-May until mid-October.

=== Zakynthos Project ===
The Ionian island of Zakynthos (western Greece) has the largest Mediterranean nesting (the second one being in Kyparissia bay). Because of this, Zakynthos has been chosen to host the original project. The group's founders, Dimitris and Anna Margaritoulis, began collecting data here in the late 1970s and from those initial studies the group grew.

Today the project continues to be the largest in scope of all the Archelon projects. There are 6 beaches on the island that are monitored by the group, all of which are in Laganas Bay to the South. These beaches are Gerakas, Daphni, Sekania, Kalamaki (Crystal beach), Laganas and Marathonissi, a small uninhabited island in the bay. All of the beaches apart from Sekania are heavily used by tourists. Sekania is specially protected due to its very high density of nests and, therefore, its importance as a nesting area. It is completely closed to visitors. The protection of all the beaches and the waters in the bay are implemented by the National Marine Park of Zakynthos. The land behind Sekania was bought by the WWF in order to prevent construction of any kind which may disturb the turtles nesting behaviour.

In 2014 the group has reported a nest count of 1066 nests on the 6 beaches. In addition its public awareness activities have informed approximately 63,600 people, mostly tourists.
