= Robert Edgar Hope-Simpson =

British doctor

- Born: 1908
- Died: 5 July 2003 (aged 94–95)
- Scientific career
- Fields: Medicine; Epidemiology

Robert Edgar Hope-Simpson (31 January 1908 – 5 July 2003) OBE FRCGP Hon FFPHM was an English general practitioner. He showed that shingles was caused by reactivation of the chickenpox virus.

== Early life ==
Hope-Simpson was born on 31 January 1908, the fourth of five children. His father, Sir John Hope Simpson was in the Indian Civil Service, in 1916 the family returned to England to farm in Somerset. Sir John later became a diplomatic envoy. His missions included Greece (to solve the refugee problems of Turks and Greece), Palestine (he wrote The Hope-Simpson Report in 1930 which examined the economic conditions and to suggested solutions to the territorial dispute between Jews and Arabs), and Newfoundland (1934–36) before it joined Canada as the 10th province in 1949 Canada (he was a Natural Commissioner and there is an area of Newfoundland called Port Hope Simpson named after him).

Hope-Simpson went to prep school at Heddon Court in Hertfordshire (1913–1919) and then Gresham's in Norfolk (1919–1925) where he won a prize for natural history. He spent a year at the Faculté des Sciences, Grenoble, (1925–26) before starting his medical studies at St Thomas' Hospital. His career choice of medicine at St Thomas' Hospital disappointed his father, who wanted him to farm. He intercalated in physiology before getting his MRCS/LRCP in 1932. It was in the laboratory that he met his future wife Eleanor Dale (daughter of Sir Henry Dale).

== Working life ==
Hope-Simpson's first post was in the Dorset County Hospital in Dorchester in Dorset as a Resident Medical Officer. He had heard that the hospital was friendly but busy. In those days he could expect one afternoon off in an otherwise seven-day working week. He would be on call for the other 156 hours. A year later, in 1933, he answered an advertisement for "an assistant with a view" to help in Beaminster in the practice of Dr. Herbert Lake. Edgar and Eleanor settled down at Gable End on Hogshill Street in Beaminster.

Being a life-long member of The Religious Society of Friends (Quakers) Hope-Simpson was a pacifist, and when World War II began in 1939, he registered as a conscientious objector, even though he was unlikely to have been called up due to his profession. During the war, he established a pioneering home nursing service amongst his rural patients, as well as outside surgeries in the Marshwood Vale, Salway Ash, Toller Porcorum, West Milton and Powerstock. He also developed a fledgling note-keeping system linking patients, where they lived and their diseases. He left Beaminster in 1945 for Cirencester where he became an elder at the Meeting House. Four years earlier his wife had given him Wensleydale general practitioner William Pickles' then new book Epidemiology in Country Practice, detailing the epidemiological research of common diseases which could be carried out by a general practitioner. Hope-Simpson modelled his approach on this, and he exchanged visits with Pickles. A year after starting at Cirencester, he transformed his practice (housed in an eighteenth-century cottage in the high street) into Cirencester Research Unit which was funded by the Public Health Laboratory Service 1947–1973 and the Department of Health and Social Security 1973-1981. The bulk of his interest was in infectious diseases. He was self-taught and without any formal epidemiological or research training. He started to write papers, particularly on chickenpox and herpes zoster, in the 1940s and 1950s, which were published in The Lancet and the BMJ.

== Work on chickenpox and shingles ==
His landmark paper, showing how immunity conferred by natural chicken-pox in childhood waned with age, published in 1965, provided the reasoning for vaccinating older adults against shingles.

Hope-Simpson studied chickenpox and shingles; the two conditions were known to be related, but the nature of the relationship was unclear. Some experts believed that two different viruses existed. Hope-Simpson increasingly believed there was only one, and took his small team of research colleagues to Yell, Shetland in 1953, where he followed up every known case in an isolated community. By 1962, new microbiological techniques enabled him to prove his point. He believed that a virus could commonly lie dormant in the human body for years or decades, and then reappear in another form. He delivered his conclusion in the Albert Wander lecture on 10 June 1964. His report became one of the most cited general practitioner publications. Later, the single virus responsible for both diseases, now known as the varicella zoster virus (VZV), was identified and isolated by Thomas Huckle Weller.

== Work on influenza ==
His career-long interest in the manner of transmission of the influenza virus was first stirred by the great epidemic of 1932–33, the year in which he entered general practice. It culminated in a book, published in 1992, which questioned the theory of person-to-person transmission being enough to explain the simultaneous appearance of influenza in places far apart. His initial hypothesis proposed that the cause of influenza epidemics during winter may be connected to a seasonal influence. His later research suggested that the correlation may be due in part to a lack of vitamin D during the wintertime, after documenting that influenza A epidemics in temperate latitudes peak in the month following the winter solstice. His findings were based not only on observation in his practice, but also on extensive historical research into past epidemics.

== Honours and final days ==
He received the Order of the British Empire, the Stuart prize from the British Medical Association, the Kuenssberg prize from the Royal College of General Practitioners, and an award from the International Society of Biometeorology. The VZV Foundation in the United States gave him its gold medal in 1999. The then-president of the Royal College of General Practitioners (RCGP) presented him with the George Abercrombie award, for outstanding contributions to the literature. He also spent a semester as Visiting Professor in Community Health, Case Western Reserve University, Cleveland, Ohio in 1974. Hope-Simpson's practice was used as a model in 1994 when the RCGP introduced research practices, which later became NHS research and development general practices. His first wife, Eleanor died in 1997 after a long illness. He remarried, when over 90. He had a daughter and four grandchildren.
