= Cranae =

Island in Greece

Native name: Κρανάη Nickname: Marathonesi
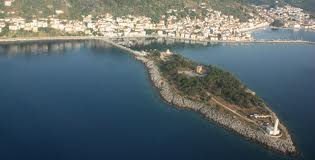
- View of the island of Cranae

- Location within Greece

Geography
- Coordinates: 36°45′15″N 22°34′26″E
- Area: 51.6 m^{2} (555 sq ft)
- Length: 413 m (1355 ft)
- Width: 17 m (56 ft)
- Highest elevation: 124 m (407 ft)

Administration
- Greece
- Region: Peloponnese
- Regional unit: Laconia
- Municipality: East Mani

Demographics
- Population: 0 (2011)
- Pop. density: 0/km^{2} (0/sq mi)

Additional information
- Time zone: EET (UTC+2)
  - Summer (DST): EEST (UTC+3)

Cranae or Kranai (Greek: Κρανάη [kraˈnai]) (also called Marathonisi) is a Greek island on the Mani Peninsula in the southern Peloponnese. Located just off the coast of the port town Gytheio (ancient Gythium), the island is linked to the mainland by a causeway built in 1898.

== Etymology ==
Some believe that the etymology for the name Cranae (Kranai) comes from the legendary king of Athens Kranaos, the successor of King Kekropas (Cecrops) as Athens was also known as "Kranaa". However the word Kranaos according to Homer it has the following meanings: 'Rocky', 'ragged', 'hard'. Therefore, some believe that the word Kranai literally means 'rocky', 'rock'.

The name "Marathonisi" translates to 'fennel-island', as the herb fennel was naturally growing on this island.

== History ==
According to legend, when Paris of Troy abducted Helen from Sparta they spent their first night in Cranae. When Gythium became the major port of ancient Sparta, Cranae became a resting spot for traders.

When Greece became a part of the Ottoman Empire, the Beys of Mani fortified Cranae with a tower-house. The tower built by the Tzannetakis family in 1829 now houses the Historical and Cultural Museum of Mani.

On the island there is a chapel dedicated to St Peter (Agios Petros) which is favored by many couples to use on their weddings due to its beautiful views of the city of Gytheio and picturesque location. There is also a prominent 23m-high lighthouse built in 1873 with high-quality marble from the area of Tainaro in south Mani peninsula.

== Gallery ==
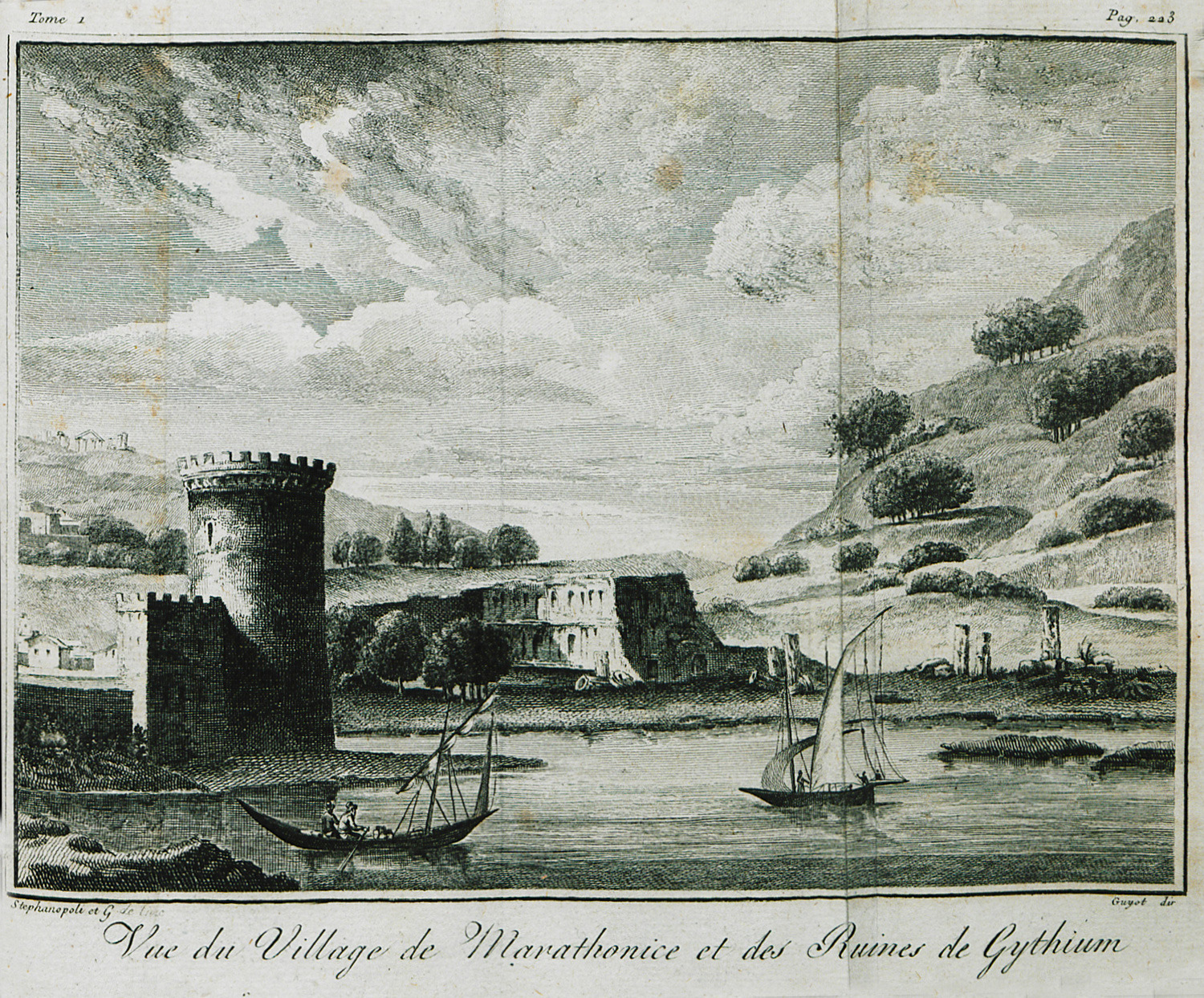
View of the island in 1800

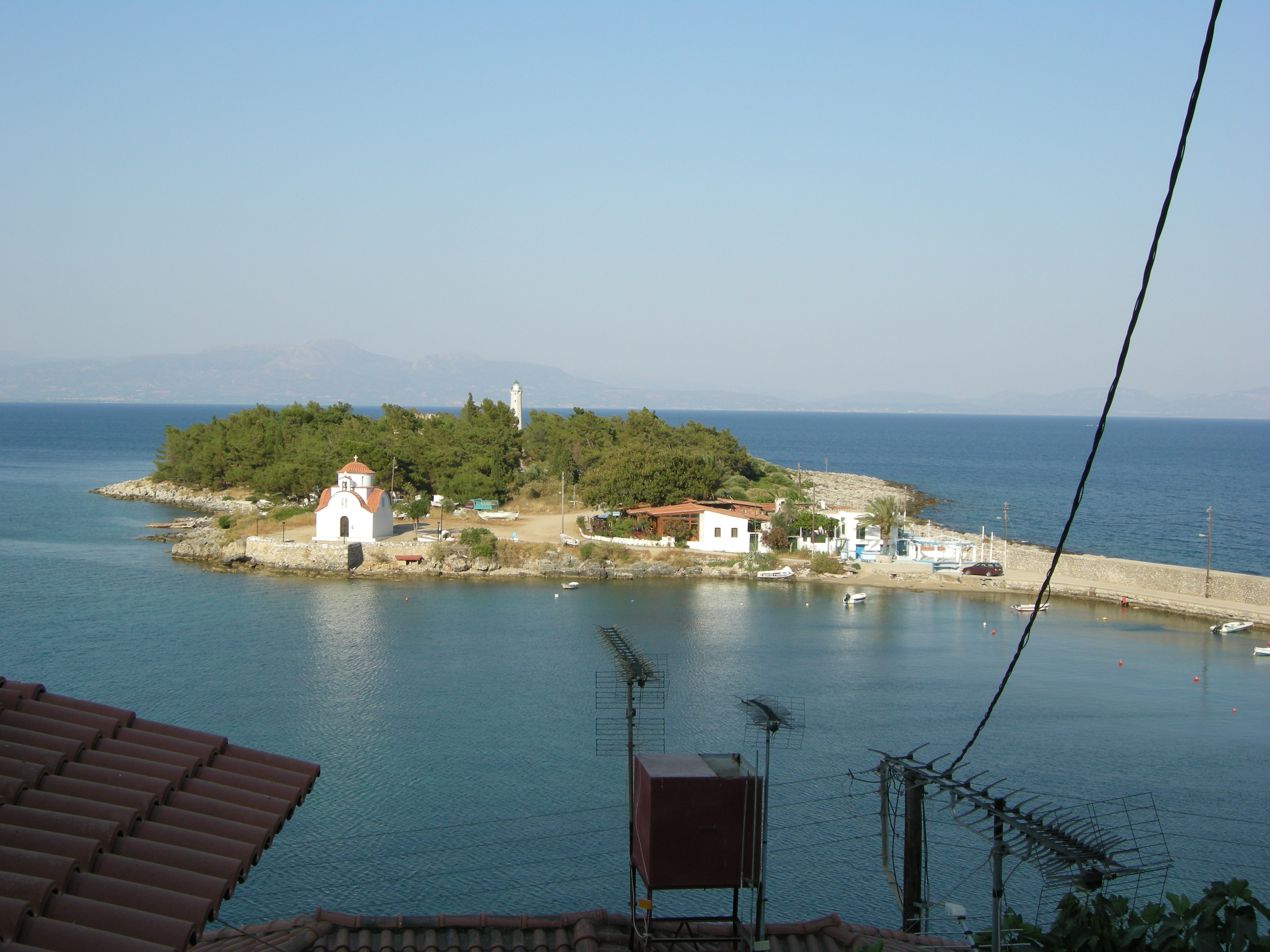
View from Gytheio

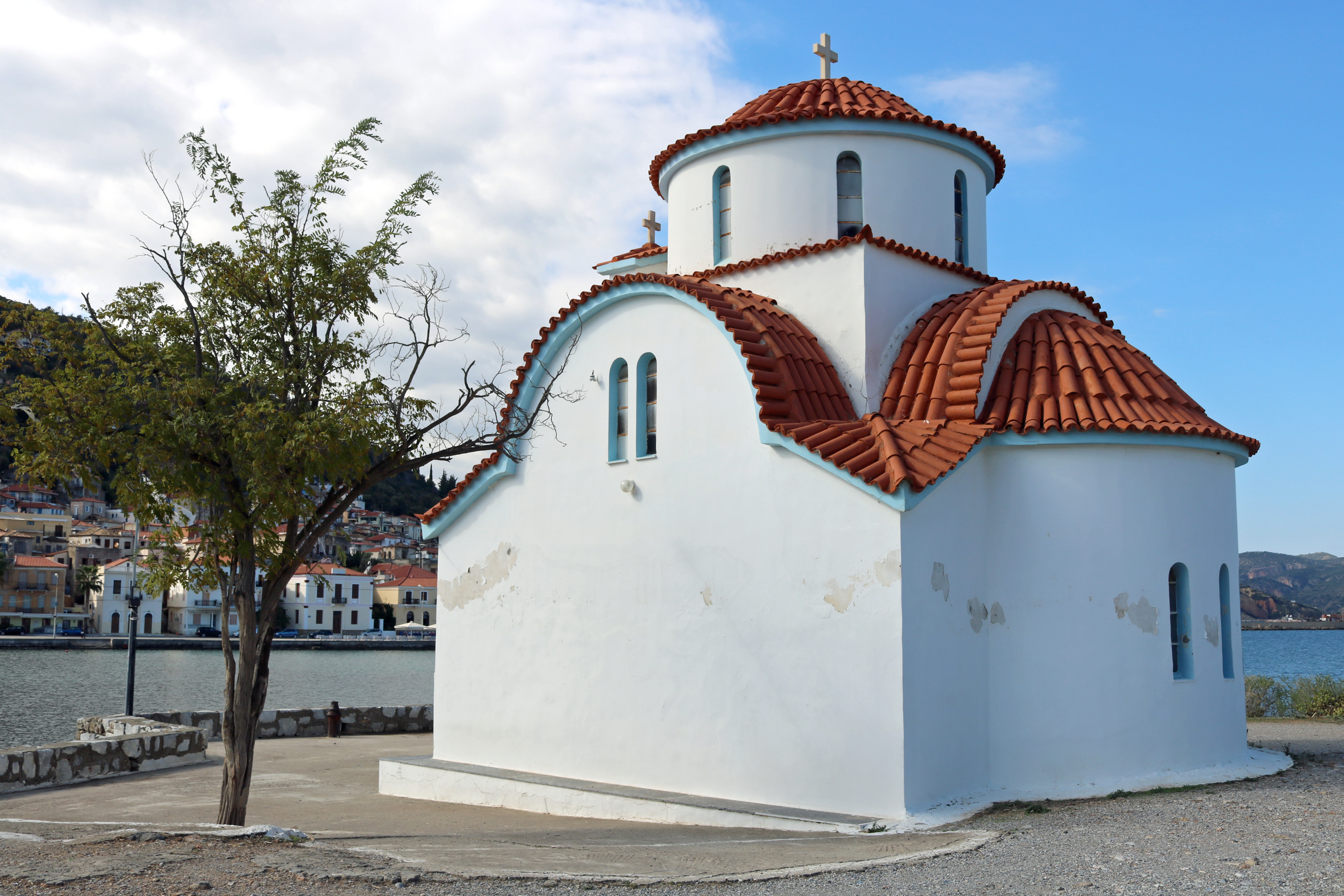
Chapel of St Peter

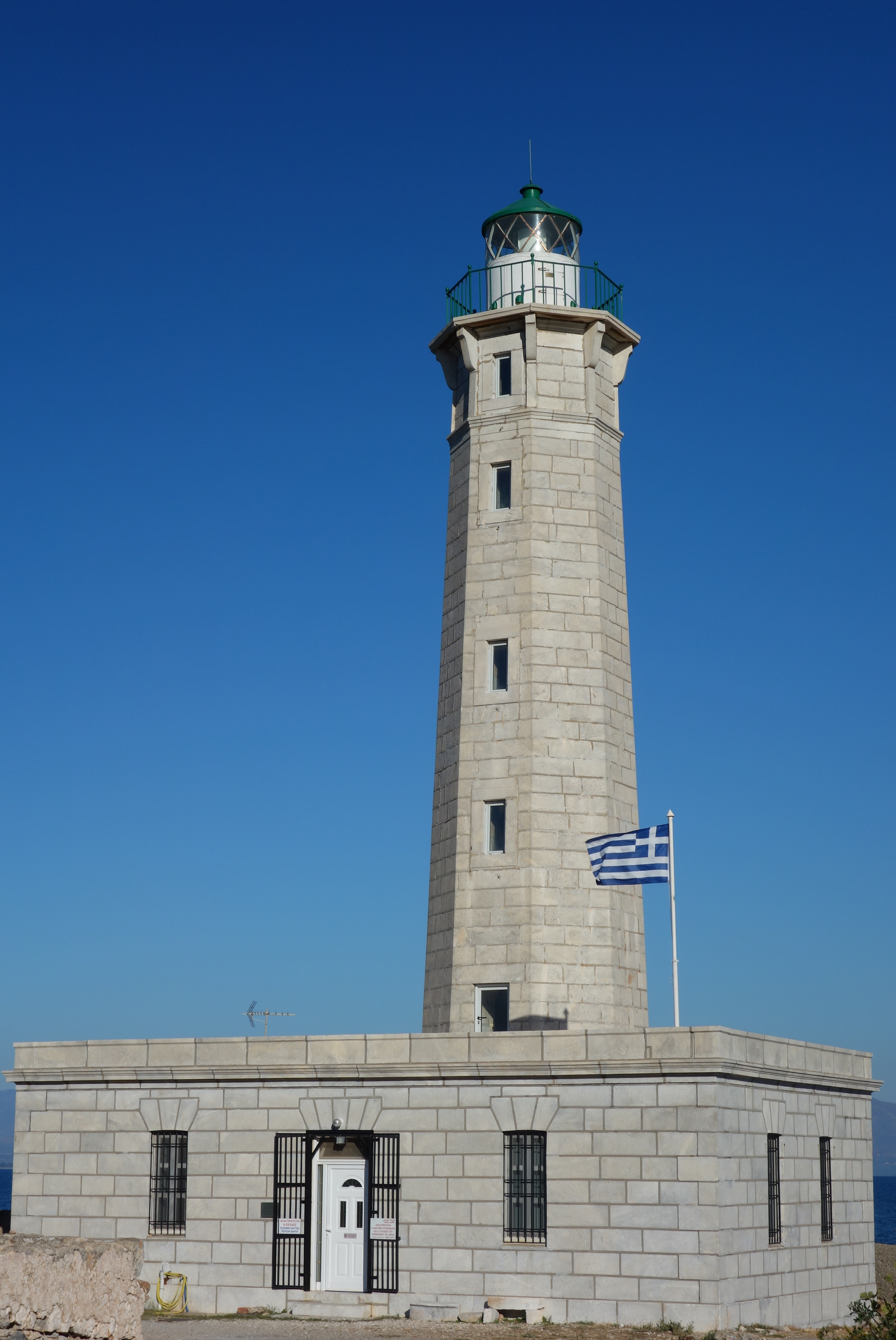
Lighthouse of Cranae

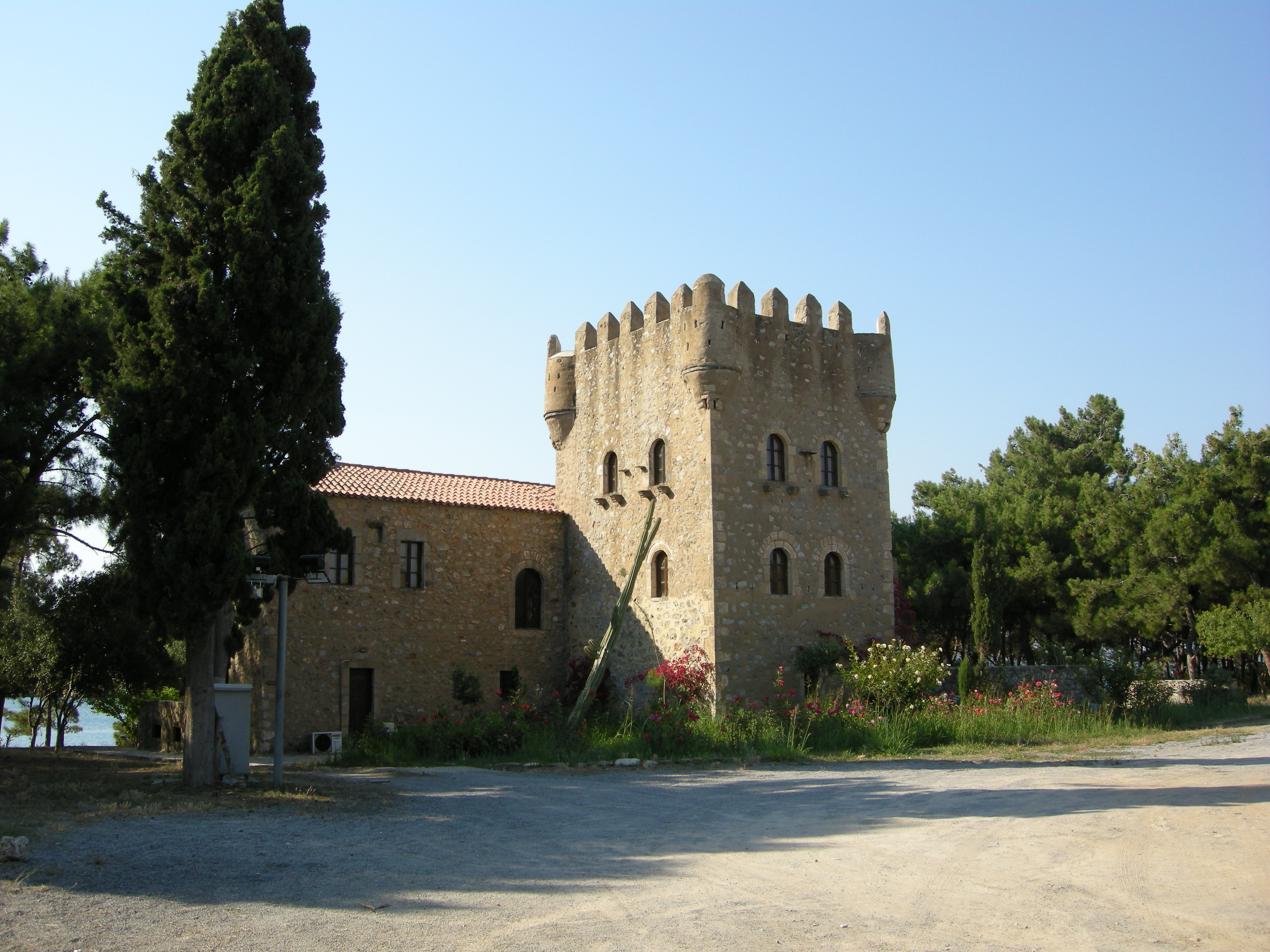
Tzanetakis' tower at Cranae

== Sources ==
- Pausanias, translated by W.H.S Jones, (1918). Pausanias Description of Greece. London: Harvard University Press. ISBN 0-14-044362-2.
- Homer, translated by Alexander Pope. The Iliad. Penguin Books Ltd; New edition (7 Mar 1996). ISBN 0140445048.
