= Gytheio =

Town in Laconia, Greece

Gytheio Γύθειο
- Municipal unit
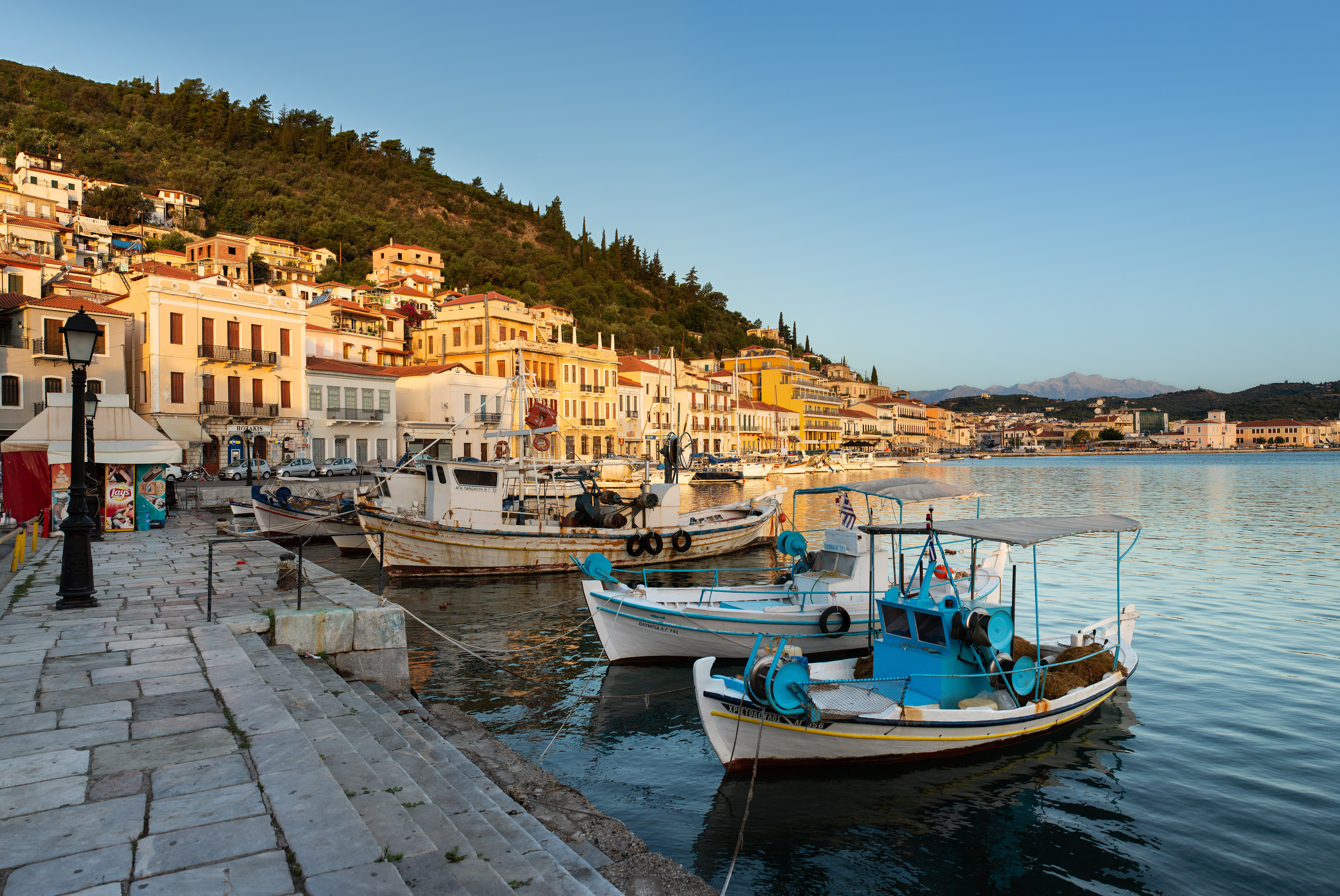
- The port and promenade

- Location within the regional unit

- Location within Greece
- Coordinates: 36°45.7′N 22°33.9′E
- Country: Greece
- Administrative region: Peloponnese
- Regional unit: Laconia
- Municipality: East Mani

Area
  - Municipal unit: 197.3 km^{2} (76.2 sq mi)
- Elevation: 5 m (16 ft)

Population (2021)
  - Municipal unit: 6,987
  - Municipal unit density: 35.41/km^{2} (91.72/sq mi)
  - Community: 4,542
- Time zone: UTC+2 (EET)
  - Summer (DST): UTC+3 (EEST)
- Postal code: 232 00
- Area code: 27330
- Vehicle registration: ΑΚ

Gytheio (Greek: Γύθειο [ˈʝiθio]) or Gythio, also the ancient Gythium or Gytheion (Ancient Greek: Γύθειον), is a town on the eastern shore of the Mani Peninsula in the Peloponnese of southern Greece, in the historical and administrative region of Laconia. It is the largest and most important town in Mani. Gytheio is the seat of the municipality of East Mani. Gytheio is significant in the history of Mani and the Maniots.

Ancient Gytheio was the seaport of Ancient Sparta, approximately 40 kilometres (25 miles) north. Gytheio continued to be a major port until its destruction in the 4th century CE, possibly by an earthquake. Its strategic location made it a coveted possession for foreign powers into the 20th century.

The small island of Cranae, where, according to myth, Paris and Helen spent their first night together before departing for Troy, lies off the coast of Gytheio.

Gytheio was formerly a municipality in Laconia. Since a nationwide 2011 government reform it is part of the municipality East Mani, of which it is a municipal unit. The municipal unit has an area of 197.313 km^{2}.

== Historical population ==
Year	Town	Municipality
1830	500-700	-
1910	2,000+	-
1981	4,354	-
1991	4,259	7,542
2001	4,479	7,433
2011	4,717	7,106
2021	4,542	6,987

== Geography ==
Gytheio is located in the northeastern corner of the Mani Peninsula and lies on the northwestern end of the Laconian Gulf. Gytheio was built on a hill called Koumaros or Laryssio in one of the most fertile areas in Mani, near the mouth of the Gythium River, which is usually dry and has been nicknamed Xerias "dry river"; today, most of the Xerias is covered by Ermou Avenue.

Directly north and visible from the harbor is Profitis Ilias, the ultra-prominent peak of Taygetus, the mountain range whose spine juts southward into the Mediterranean Sea and forms the Mani Peninsula.

On the ridgeline running south from Profitis Ilias sits the Monastery of Panayia Yiatrissa overlooking the valley toward Gytheio; the E4 hiking path connects the three, running south from Profitis Ilias, passing by the monastery, and leading to Gytheio.

Northeast of Gytheio is the delta of the Evrotas River. Offshore are several small islands; the most important of these islands is Cranae, on which sits the Tzannetakis Tower (now the Historical and Cultural museum of Mani) and a lighthouse built of solid marble. Today Cranae is connected to the mainland by a causeway.

Approximately 5 km (3 mi) southwest is a passageway to the deeper Mani, historically guarded by Castle Passavas (now in ruins), which towers over the site of ancient Las. Further west is the historic city of Areopoli and the Caves of Diros, which are important tourist attractions.

Gytheio is only 40 km (25 mi) southeast of Sparti, connected by Greek National Road 39. The town center is situated around the port. Pine trees are situated in the west and rocky mountains in the north.

== Nearest places ==
- South: Mavrovouni
- Southwest: Castle Passava
- West: Rachi
- North: Stefania
- East: Cranae

== History ==
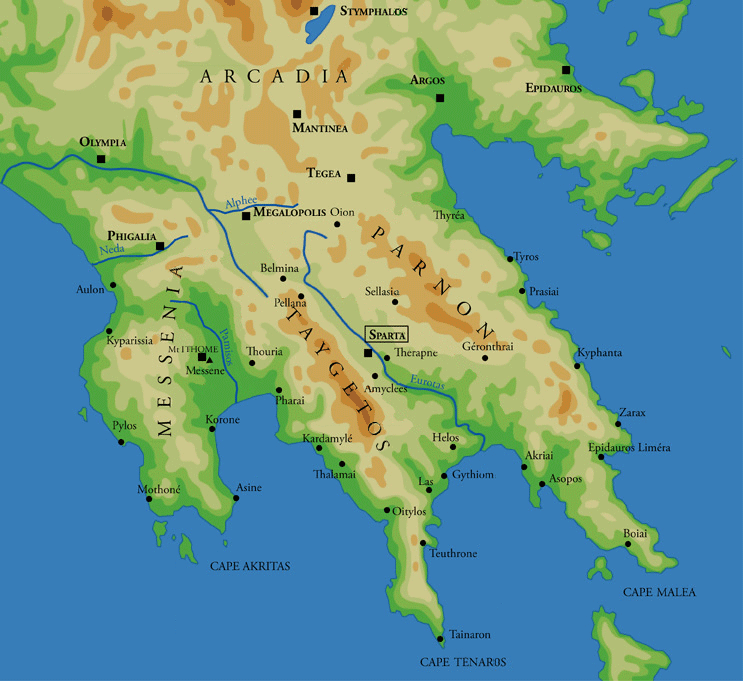
Map showing Gythium in ancient Greece.

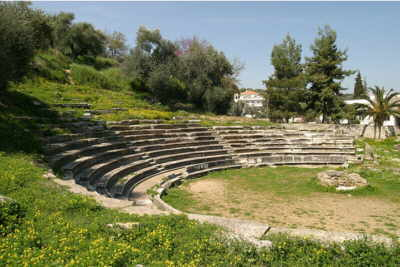
The ancient theatre of Gythio.

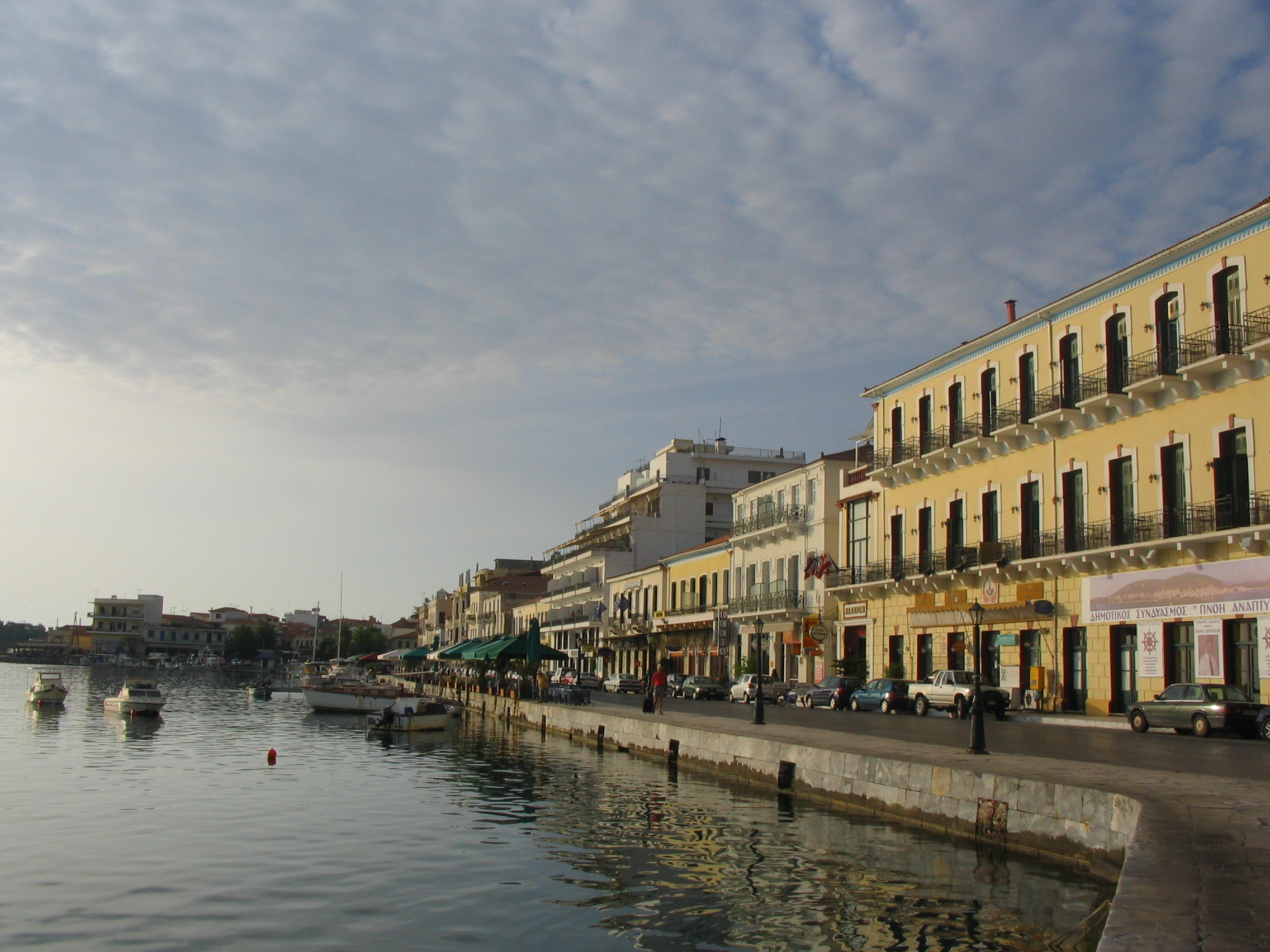
View of the promenade.

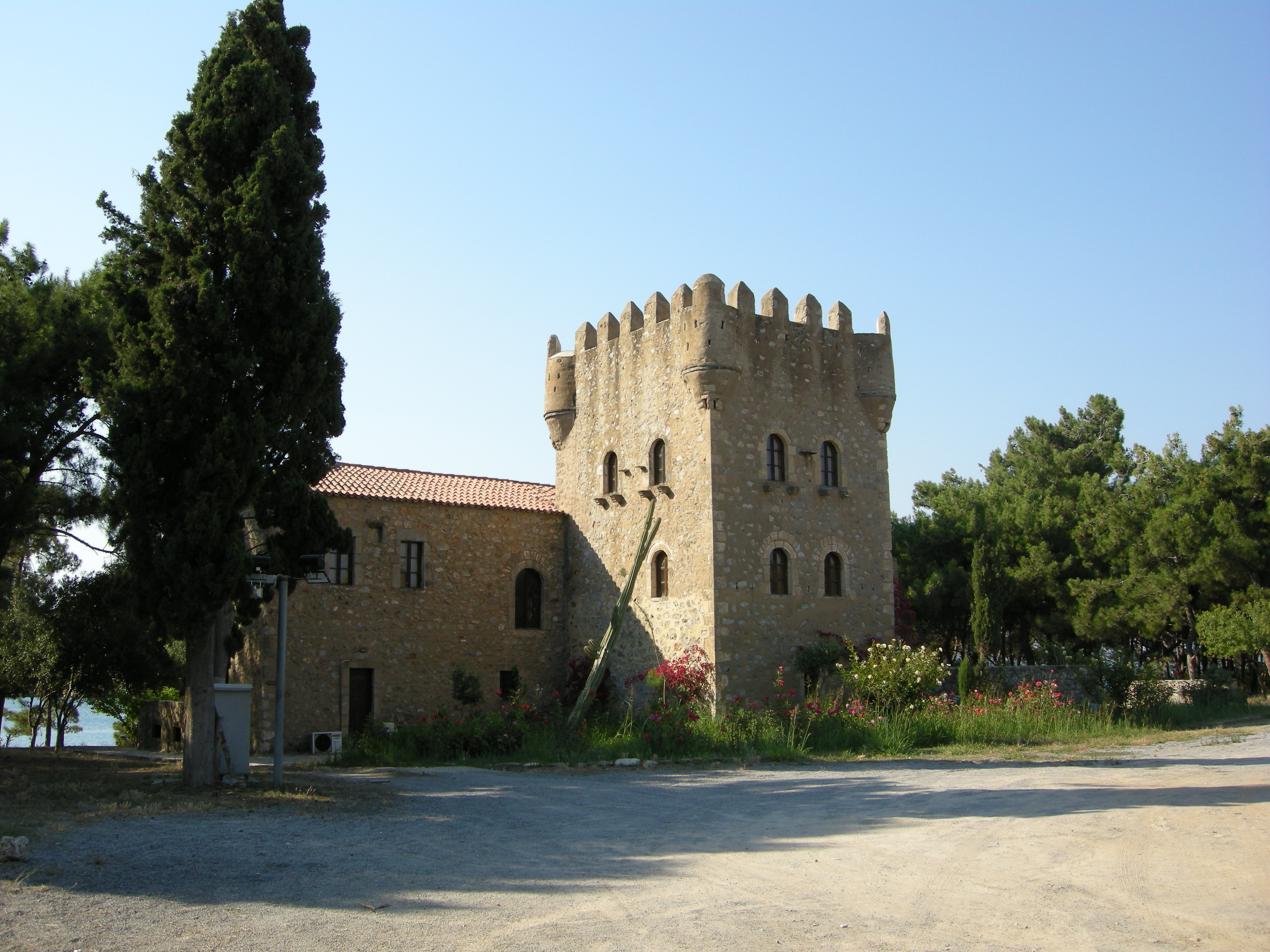
Tzannetakis Tower (1829) on Cranae Island

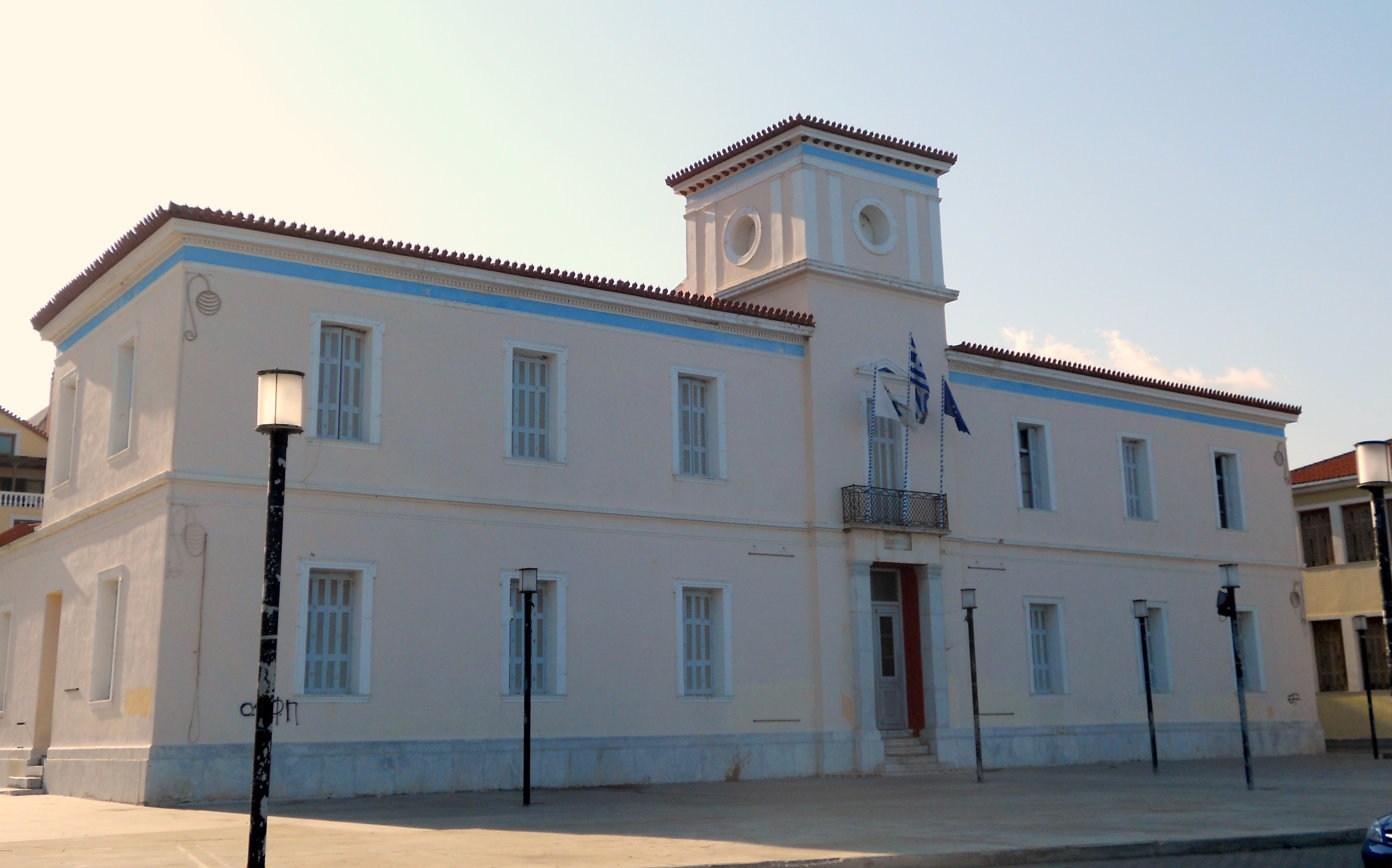
The city hall, designed by Ernst Ziller.

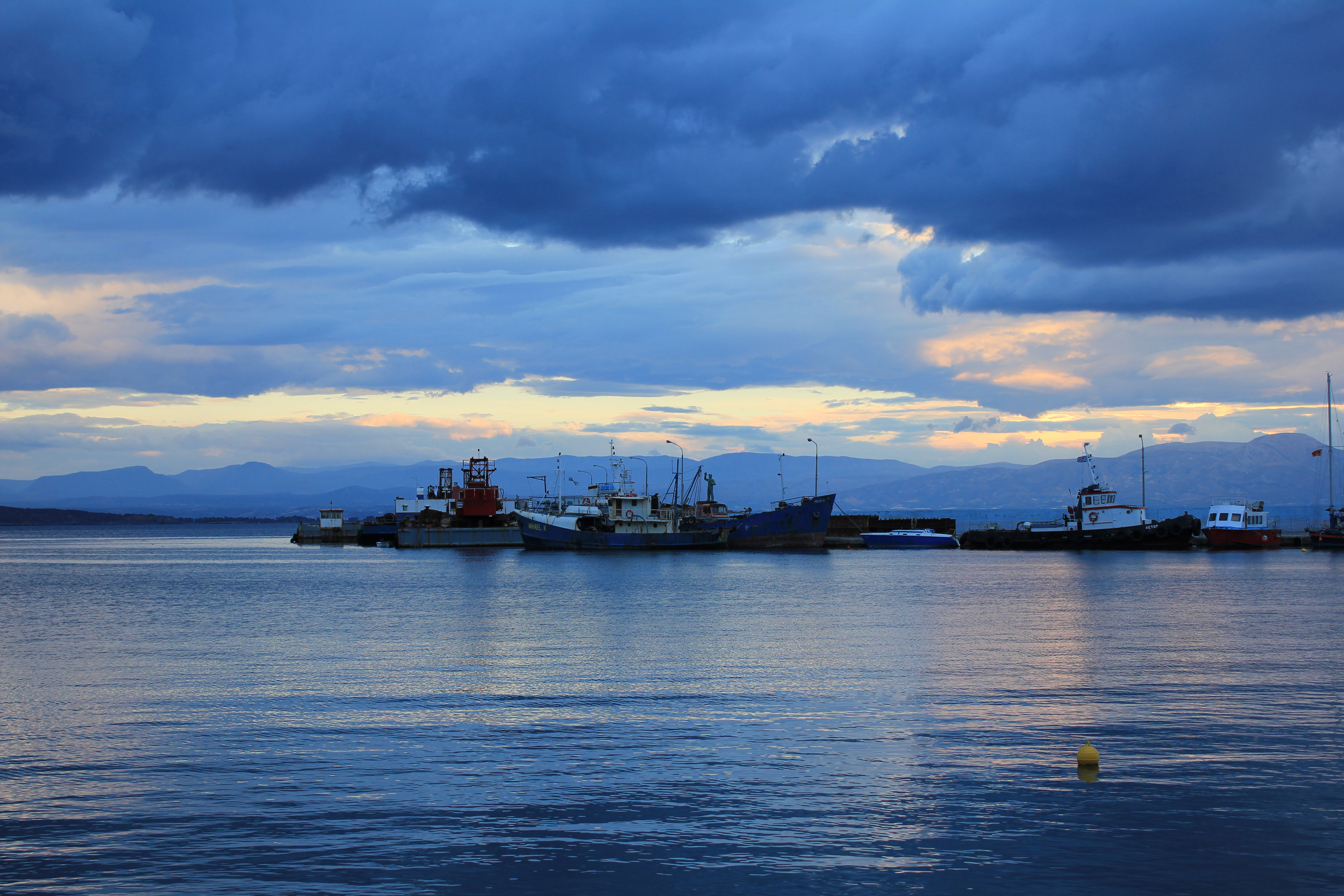
Port of Gytheio as seen from the promenade on October 23, 2012.

The mythical founders of ancient Gythium were Heracles and Apollo, who frequently appear on its coins or in other legends, and Castor and Pollux: the former of these names may point to the influence of Phoenician traders from Tyre, who visited the Laconian shores at a very early period. It is thought that Gytheio may have been the center of their purple dye trade because the Laconian Gulf had a plentiful source of murex. In classical times it was a community of the Perioeci caste, politically dependent on Sparta, though doubtless with a municipal life of its own.

In 455 BC during the First Peloponnesian War (460 – 445 BCE) between Sparta and Athens Gytheium was burned by the Athenian admiral Tolmides, who besieged the city with 50 ships and 4,000 hoplites. It was rebuilt and likely became the shipyard for the Spartan fleet in the Second Peloponnesian War (431 — 404 BCE). In 407 BC, Alcibiades landed there and saw the thirty triremes the Spartans were building. In 370 BC, the Thebans under the command of Epaminondas besieged the city successfully for three days after ravaging Laconia, but it was recaptured by the Spartans three days later.

In 219 BC, Philip V of Macedon unsuccessfully attempted to capture the city. Under Nabis, Gythium became a major naval arsenal and port. During the Roman-Spartan War, Gythium was captured after a lengthy siege. After the war finished, Gythium was made part of the Union of Free Laconians under Achean protection. Nabis recaptured Gythium three years and the Spartan fleet defeated the Achean fleet outside of Gythium. Gythium was liberated by a Roman fleet under the command of Aulus Atilius Serranus.

Subsequently, Gythium formed the most important of the Union of Free Laconians, a group of twenty-four, later eighteen, communities leagued together to maintain their autonomy against Sparta and declared free by Caesar Augustus. The highest officer of the confederacy was the general, who was assisted by a treasurer (rauias), while the chief magistrates of the several communities bore the title of ephors.

In Roman times Gythium remained a major port and it prospered as a member of the Union. As purple dye was popular in Rome, Gythium exported that as well as porphyry and rose antique marble. Evidence of the ancient Gythium prosperity can be found by the fact that the Romans built an ancient theatre which is well preserved today and is still used occasionally. The ancient theatre and the city's acropolis (west of the theatre) were discovered by the archeologist Dimitris Skias in 1891. Some time in the 4th century AD, the city was destroyed. What happened to Gythium is not recorded but it is thought to have been either sacked by Alaric and the Visigoths, pillaged by the Slavs or destroyed by the massive earthquake that struck the area in 375 AD.

After the earthquake, Gythium was abandoned. It remained a small village throughout the Byzantine and Ottoman times. Its importance grew when Tzannetos Grigorakis built his tower at Cranae and more people came and settled at Gytheio. During the Greek War of Independence, refugees flooded into Mani and made Gytheio a major town.

The modern Gytheio opened a port in the 1960s. Ferries sail from Gytheio to Kythira almost daily and also to Crete twice a week. It is the See of the Diocese of Gytheion and Oitylo, headed by a Metropolitan bishop of the Orthodox Church of Greece. Gytheio is the largest and most important town in Mani. Most of the ruins of ancient Gythium are now submerged in the Laconian Gulf. Some walls' remains can be seen today on the sandy beach of Valtaki and in the shallow waters, where the well known Dimitrios shipwreck lies stranded. It is also the capital of the municipality of Gytheio.

== Province ==
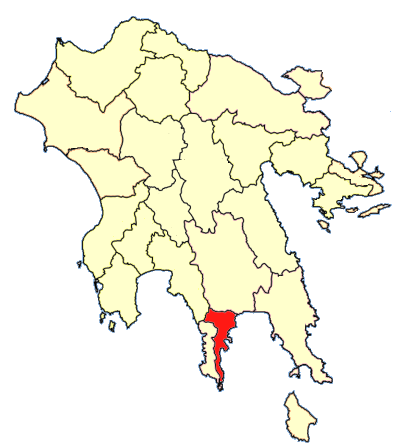
The former province of Gytheio within the Peloponnese.

The province of Gytheio (Greek: Επαρχία Γυθείου) was one of the provinces of the Laconia Prefecture. Its territory corresponded with that of the current municipal units Gytheio and East Mani. It was abolished in 2006.

== Notable people ==
- Alexandros Othonaios (1879–1970), general and former Prime Minister of Greece
- Tzannis Tzannetakis (1927–2010), politician and former Prime Minister of Greece

== International relations ==
Gytheio is twinned with:

- Villeneuve-lès-Avignon, France

== Notes ==
Roman Gythium: Pausanias has left us a description of the town as it existed in the reign of Marcus Aurelius, the agora, the Acropolis, the island of Cranae (Marathonisi) where Paris celebrated his nuptials with Helen of Troy, the Migonium or precinct of Aphrodite Migonitis (occupied by the modern town), and the hill Larysium (Koumaro) rising above it. The numerous remains extant, of which the theatre and the buildings partially submerged by the sea are the most noteworthy, all belong to the Roman period.

== Sources ==
=== Primary ===
- Livy, translated by Henry Bettison, (1976). Rome and the Mediterranean. London: Penguin Classics. ISBN 0-14-044318-5.
- Pausanias, translated by W.H.S Jones, (1918). Pausanias Description of Greece. London: Harvard University Press. ISBN 0-14-044362-2.
- Polybius, translated by Frank W. Walbank, (1979). The Rise of the Roman Empire. New York: Penguin Classics. ISBN 0-14-044362-2.

=== Secondary ===
- Collitz-Bechtel, Sammlung d. griech. Dialekt-Inschriften, iii. Nos. 4562-4573; British School Annual, x. 179 foll.
- Paul Cartledge and Antony Spawforth, (2002). Hellenistic and Roman Sparta: A tale of two cities. London: Routledge. ISBN 0-415-26277-1
- E. Curtius, Peloponnesos, ii. 267 foll. Inscriptions: Le Bas-Foucart, Voyage archéologique, ii. Nos. 238-248 f.
- Patrick Leigh Fermor, (1984). Mani: Travels in the Southern Peloponnese. London: Penguin. ISBN 0-14-011511-0
- Peter Greenhalgh and Edward Eliopoulos, (1985). Deep into Mani:Journey to the southern tip of Greece. London: Trinity Press ISBN 0-571-13524-2
- Peter Green, (1990). Alexander to Actium: The Historical Evolution of the Hellenistic Age, (2nd edition). Los Angeles: University of California Press. ISBN 0-500-01485-X.
- Rosemary Hall, Paul Hellander, Corinne Simcock and David Willet. Lonely Planet: Greece. Singapore: SNP Printing Pte Ltd. ISBN 0-86442-527-9
- Kyriakos Kassis, (1979). Mani's History. Athens: Presoft
- William Leake, Travels in the Morea, i. 244 foll.
- Maria Mavromataki, (2001). 8,500 Years of Civilization: Greece: Between Legend and History. Athens: Haïtalis. ISBN 960-8284-01-5
- G. Weber, De Gytheo et Lacedaemoniorum rebus navalibus (Heidelberg, 1833)
