= Kastania =

Kastania may refer to:

- Kastania, Ioannina, Greece
- Kastania, Laconia, Greece
- Kastania, Pieria, Greece
- Kastania, Trikala, Greece
- Kastania, Kozani, Greece
- Kastania Cave
- Siege of Kastania, fought in July 1780
- Kastania, a mountain of Arcadia, the ancient Cnacalus
- Kastania, a village of Koumanis in Elis, Greece
