= Arna, Greece =

Arna Άρνα
- Community
- Location within Greece
- Coordinates: 36°53′N 22°25′E
- Country: Greece
- Administrative region: Peloponnese
- Regional unit: Laconia
- Municipality: Sparta
- Municipal unit: Faris

Population (2021)
  - Community: 102
- Time zone: UTC+2 (EET)
  - Summer (DST): UTC+3 (EEST)

Arna (Greek: Άρνα) is a village on the eastern slopes of the Taygetus mountain range, at an altitude of 700 to 850 m (2,300 to 2,790 ft).

Located in Laconia, in the Peloponnese, it used to form part of the municipal unit of Faris until 31 December 2010. Since 1 January 2011, as part of the Kallikratis reform, it has been one of the local communities of the municipality of Sparta.

The nearest major towns are Gytheio, 35 km (22 mi) to the southeast, and Sparta, approximately 40 km to the north.

The area has a rich history. Near the village, at the Arkina site, two Mycenaean-era chamber tombs have been found. Artefacts from many periods have also been found at Arna and Arkina, mostly ceramic containers. These findings support the conclusion that the site has been, since ancient times, a stop on the road connecting Sparta and Messenia.

The residents of Arna featured prominently in the Greek War of Independence (1821–1829). A close-by reminder of that struggle is the "Kolokotronis Cave", on the north slope of Mt. Annina. Folk tradition has it that Constantine Kolokotronis (father of famed hero Theodoros Kolokotronis) sought refuge in this cave after being wounded defending the tower of the nearby village of Kastania, at the side of fellow revolutionary Panagiotaros Venetsanakos, a Maniot from Mesa Mani. He was discovered there the next day and killed; his body was thrown into the cave.

Today, Arna's population is on the decline, as is the population of the Greek countryside nationwide. The 1971 census counted 324 residents in the village; today, fewer than 150 remain. There are, however, positive signs of increased activity: the number of visits from emigrant Arniotes is on the rise year-round.
