= Sminos =

Sminos Σμήνος
- Municipal unit
- Location within the regional unit

- Location within Greece
- Coordinates: 36°51′N 22°27′E
- Country: Greece
- Administrative region: Peloponnese
- Regional unit: Laconia
- Municipality: East Mani

Area
  - Municipal unit: 94.50 km^{2} (36.49 sq mi)

Population (2021)
  - Municipal unit: 1,139
  - Municipal unit density: 12.05/km^{2} (31.22/sq mi)
- Time zone: UTC+2 (EET)
  - Summer (DST): UTC+3 (EEST)
- Vehicle registration: AK

Sminos (Greek: Σμήνος, before 2001: Σμύνος - Smynos) is a former municipality in Laconia, Peloponnese, Greece. Since the 2011 local government reform it has been part of the municipality East Mani, of which it is a municipal unit. The municipal unit has an area of 94.503 km^{2}. Population 1,139 (2021).

It is located just north of the Mani Peninsula on the eastern slopes of Mt. Taygetos, and it is named after the river Smynos, that runs through it. The region is known as Vardounia (and its villages as Vardounochoria), after the medieval Vardounia castle located in the area, now in ruins. Historically, Vardounia was a buffer zone between the Ottoman-Turkish controlled Evrotas plains and the Mani Peninsula.

The seat of the municipality was in Agios Nikolaos. The most historic village of the municipal unit of Sminos is the mountainous village of Kastania. It has two towers (pirgi), in which its inhabitants used to defend themselves. The village has two coffee shops and attracts tourists in the summer. The largest village in the municipality is Petrina, known for its PDO olive oil.

The most prominent site in the municipal unit is the Monastery of Panagia Giatrissa which attracts hundreds of thousands of tourists and worshipers every year. The Monastery sits on the path of the European walking route E4. Other sites of interest include the Vasilitsa forest (also on the path of the European walking route E4), and the network of canyons formed by river Smynos and its tributaries. Formerly, the municipality rarely received tourists, except for visitors to the monastery; in more recent years ecotourism has been on the rise.

== See also ==
- Mani Peninsula - for a detailed history of the region
