= Monastery of Panayia Yiatrissa =

Greek Orthodox church and monastery in southern Greece

Panayia Yiatrissa
- Παναγία Γιάτρισσα
- Location of the monastery in Greece
- Interactive map of Panayia Yiatrissa

Monastery information
- Other names: Panagia Giatrisa; Moni Panagia Giatrissa
- Order: Ecumenical Patriarchate of Constantinople
- Denomination: Greek Orthodox
- Established: 382 AD (as a church)
- Reestablished: 1683 AD (as a monastery)
- Dedication: Our Lady of Healing
- Diocese: Gytheio and Itylo

Architecture
- Status: Monastery; Church
- Functional status: Active
- Style: Byzantine

Site
- Location: Kastania, Laconia
- Country: Greece
- Coordinates: 36°50′58″N 22°23′16″E
- Public access: yes
- Other information: East Mani 230 61, Greece, +30 2733 094086

Pronunciation of "Panayia Yiatrissa"

The Monastery of Panayia Yiatrissa (Greek: Παναγία Γιάτρισσα, pronounced [pɑːnɑː'jiːɑː jiː’ɑːtriːsɑː]) is a Greek Orthodox church and monastery in the southern Peloponnese of Greece on the Mani Peninsula. It is dedicated to the Virgin Mary; a colloquial translation of Panayia Yiatrissa is “Our Lady of Healing”, and Greek churches dedicated to Mary are typically called "Panagia". Tradition holds that it was established as an Orthodox monastery in 1683 and that numerous miraculous healings have occurred there.

The church was erected on the site of the ruins of an Ancient Greek temple of Athena in the Taygetus mountain range in as early as AD 382, coincident with the Christianization of Greece in the early Byzantine period. The complex grew to include many structures spread over a wide area, but at some point it was largely or wholly abandoned for centuries, until its re-opening as a monastery and Panagia in the 17th century.

The condition of the monastery has ebbed and flowed with the long and tumultuous history of the Mani Peninsula. Today, the monastery complex includes a moderately-sized, ornately-decorated, Byzantine-style church and a small chapel. Residential quarters for overnight visitors surround the interior courtyard. The site offers visitors a scenic 360-degree vista, made accessible by a rampart that encircles the complex and enables visitors to walk its perimeter.

The church is primarily used in celebration of the Nativity of Mary, the annual feast day commemorating the birth of the Virgin Mary on September 8. On the feast day, worshippers converge on the monastery individually and in large groups. The monastery has sleeping and eating quarters for several dozen overnight visitors, but the remainder either camp outside or find other accommodations.

The monastery was declared a holy shrine in 1972, and since 1977 it has been staffed full-time by clergy in residence. The monastery maintains a minimal staff of one or two residents and is open most days for visitors and tourists, many seeking views of the Mediterranean Sea and the mountains and valleys of the Taygetus setting. Liturgies are held regularly, and special services and visits can be arranged by contacting the monastery.

== Name ==
The literal translation of the Greek word panagia (Παναγία)—sometimes transliterated as panayia—is “All-Holy”. The term is used in the Eastern Orthodox Church as a title for the Virgin Mary, the mother of Jesus Christ, analogous to the appellation “Our Lady" in Roman Catholic Church traditions.

The word yiatrissa (Γιάτρισσα) comes from the Ancient Greek for “doctor” or, more generally, “healer.”

A literal translation of "Panayia Yiatrissa" yields “All-Holy Healer,” but a more commonly understood translation is “Our Lady of Healing"—a clearer reference to the Virgin Mary and the tradition of miraculous healings associated with the site.

== Location ==
Location of Panayia Yiatrissa in the Southern Pelopennese

Panayia Yiatrissa is located in the Taygetus mountain range on the remote Mani Peninsula in the Peloponnese, 5 km from the town of Kastania. It sits on a saddle ridge straddling the eastern and western slopes of the Taygetus between the Laconian Gulf and the Messenian Gulf, both visible from the monastery. The monastery is in the East Mani municipality of the regional unit of Laconia. Panayia Yiatrissa lies on the E4 European long distance path between Sparti and Gytheio.

== History ==
A detailed history of Panayia Yiatrissa was composed in 1902 by Abbot Sofroniou Sarantopoulou, based on “factual information from multiple sources and consideration of oral tradition.” He found that a religious site had existed there in different forms dating back to classical antiquity, and that the monastery of today is located where a temple dedicated to the pagan goddess Athena once stood. This temple was attended by priests who maintained the sanctuary and an altar for performance of rituals. In AD 382, a temple priest named Vrasithas (Βρασίδας) travelled to the Peloponnesian city of Patras and was introduced to a new monotheistic religion, Christianity, that was burgeoning at the time. The Edict of Thessalonica issued in AD 380 made Christianity the Roman Empire’s state religion.

In Patras, Vrasithas was converted, baptized, and given the Christian name Vitalios (Βιτάλιος). Upon his return to the temple of Athena, he persuaded the priests to convert to Christianity. Tradition states that these men then spread Christianity throughout the region of Laconia.

The temple of Athena was transformed into a church dedicated to “γεννέσιον της Θεοτόκου και αειπάρθενου Μαρίας,” literally “the birth of the Mother of God, the ever-virgin Mary.” The church next constructed a complex of buildings, eventually creating a small town spanning approximately 200,000 square metres (2,200,000 sq ft).

Abbot Sofroniou Sarantopoulou noted that the passage of time and the Mani Peninsula’s history of devastating wars have left little from this period. Nonetheless, in his day, the area remained known as “καλογερικό,” meaning “a place of monks.”

From c. 400 to the late 1600s, a large gap appears in Sarantopoulou’s history. Southern Laconia, and the Mani Peninsula in particular, resisted large-scale conversion for many centuries; another version of the monastery's earliest history is more consistent with the fact of later Christianization. According to regional lore, in c. 980 Nikon the Metanoeite traversed the complex. Inspired, he then went on to proselytize to the native Maniots of the isolated and rugged peninsula, where this “fiery apostle of the new religion” is credited with building many churches for the recalcitrant region and converting the Maniots to Christianity.

Sarantopoulou’s story picks up again in 1632, with the legend of a wealthy lord of Kastania:

"Kyriakoulis Iliafentis with his wife Maria, both being 56 years of age and having no children, were distraught and ashamed by their childlessness” (it being a social stigma), “decided to separate themselves from the community of Kastania and to live in isolation. With this in mind, they built a church on the old temple site using boulders that remained. They also built a large bridge to the town of Arna, and donated all their properties, to this purpose, and planned to build housing for monks to live on the monastery site. Unexpectedly, however, the barren wife Maria gave birth to a son the year after they built the church; and she gave birth to a second son another year later."

— Sofroniou Sarantopoulou

Sarantopoulou’s account continued to describe a variety of other miraculous events that occurred in relation to Panayia Yiatrissa, many related to healings. However, while it is clear that the name “Panayia” (Παναγία) may date back as far as the original temple’s conversion to Christianity (be it 382 or 980), it is not clear when or why the name “Yiatrissa” (Γιάτρισσα) was first used. It is possible that the name was associated with the site's ancient temple to Athena. Athena was associated with the medical arts (yiatriki, ιατρική) as well as chastity and virginity (parthenos, παρθένος), giving to “Panayia Yiatrissa” the meanings “Virgin Mary, Healer” or “Our Lady the Healer".

== Gallery ==
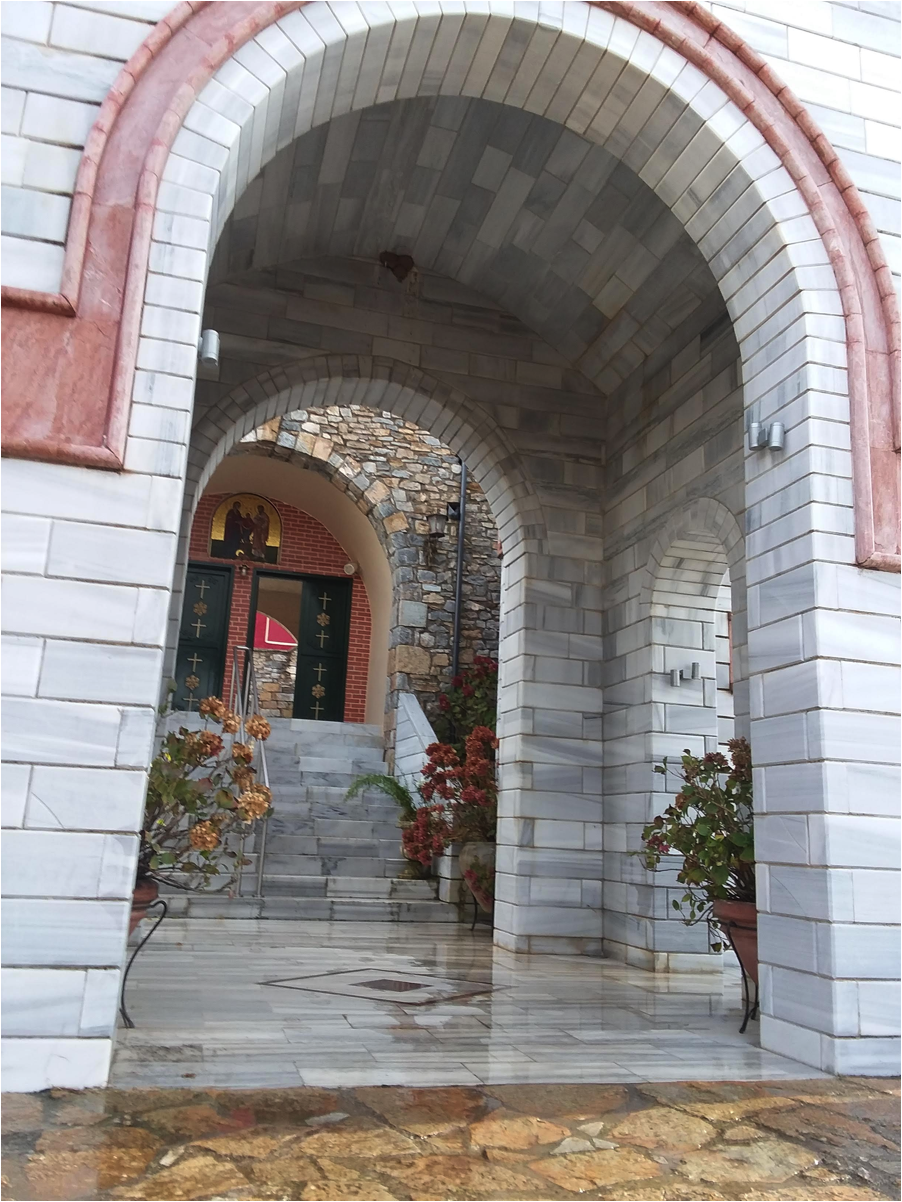
Entrance to upper courtyard and main chapel

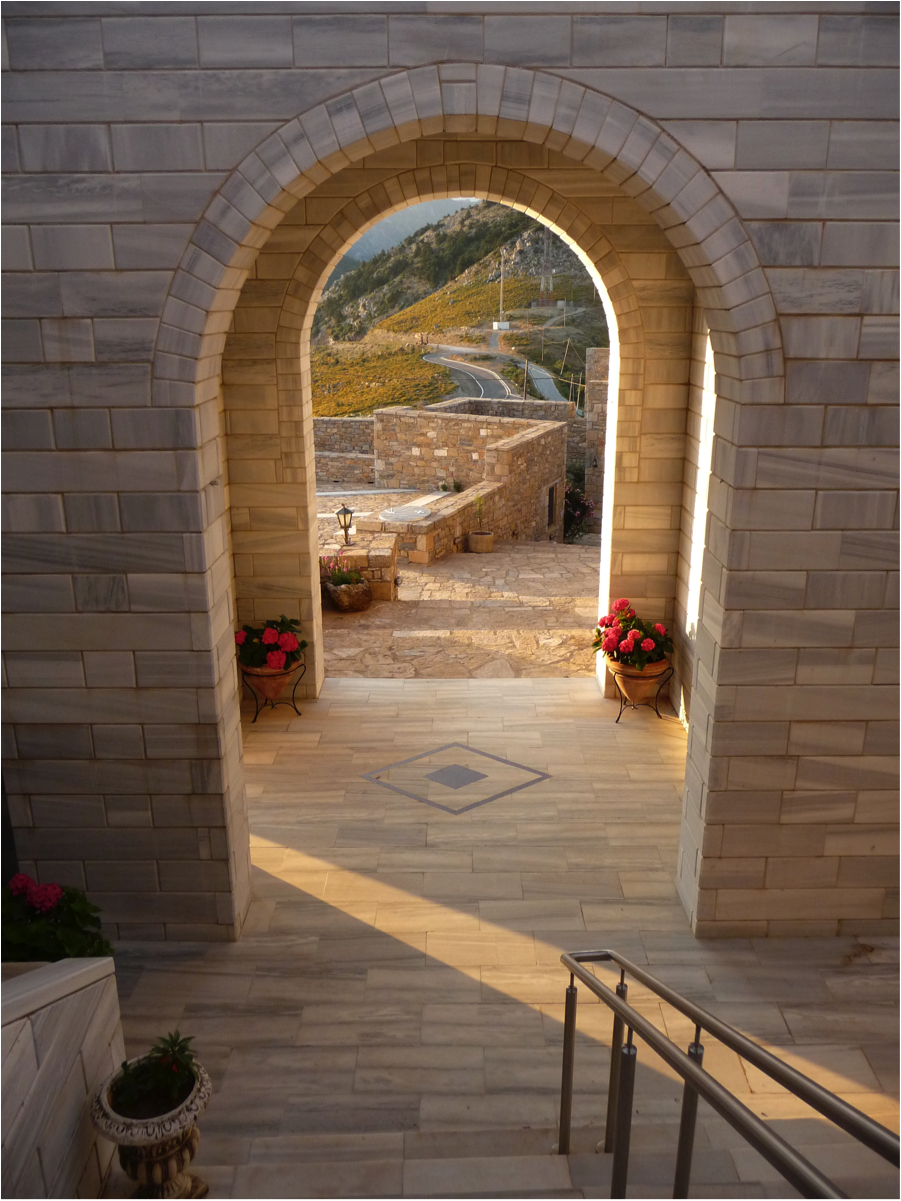
The entrance walkway, looking outward

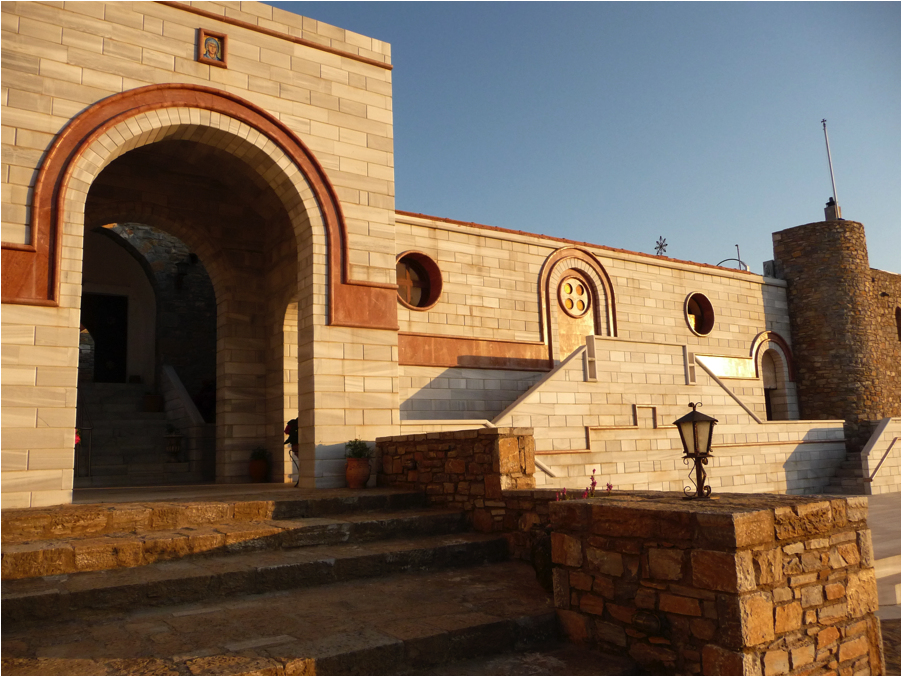
View of chapel entrance above the lower courtyard

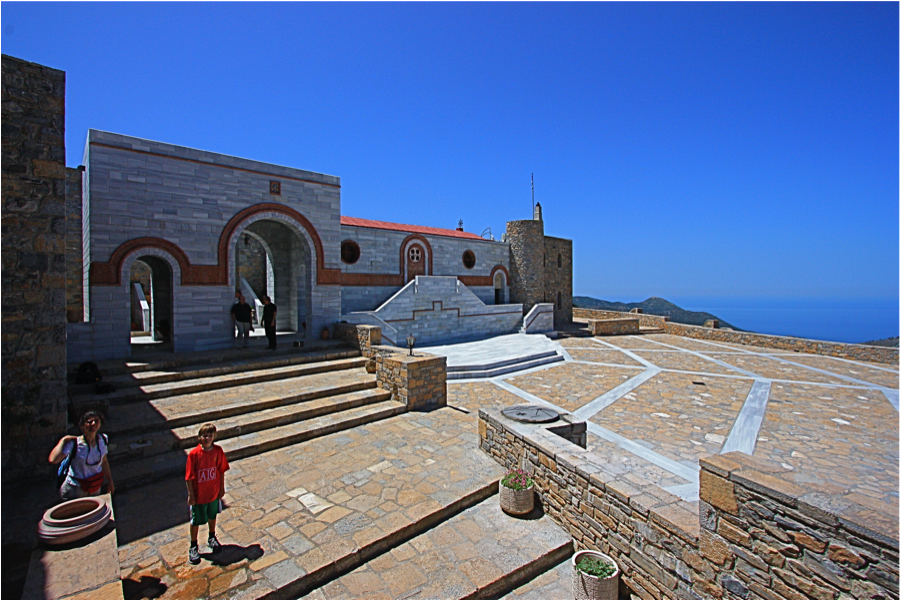
Broader view of the lower courtyard, facing the Messinian Gulf

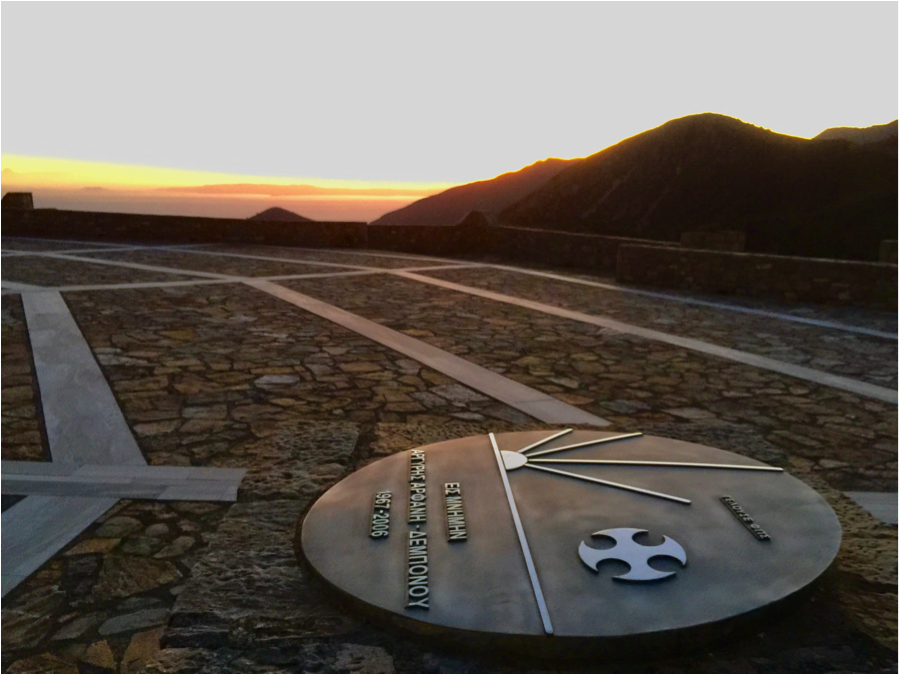
Sunset view across lower courtyard with memorial dedication, “Υελούσε Φώς” (“Her Laugh Radiated Light”) in foreground. From this spot, one can see sunrise and sunset

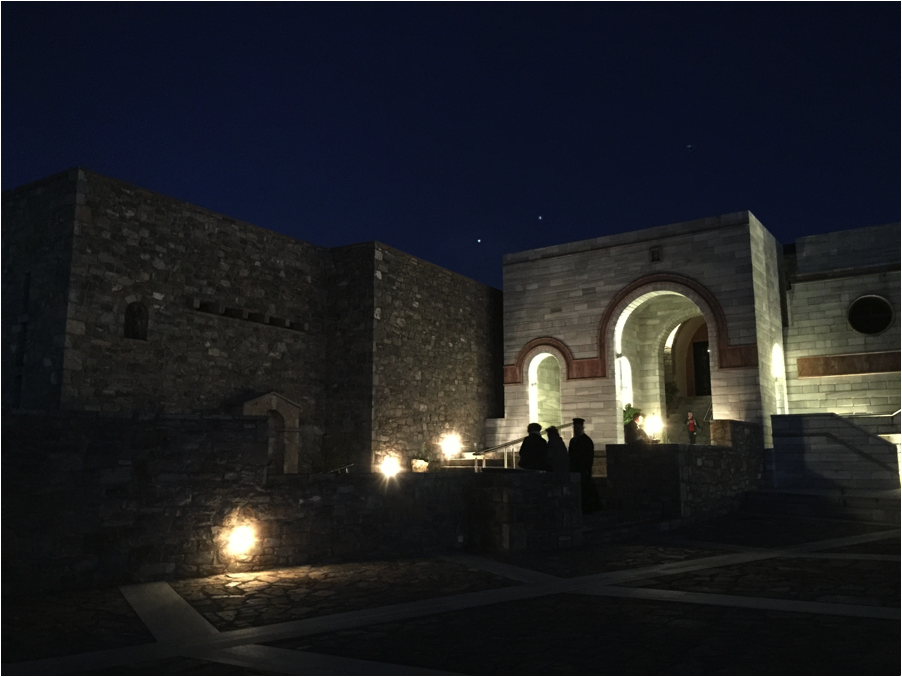
Night-time view from lower courtyard toward main chapel and upper courtyard entrance

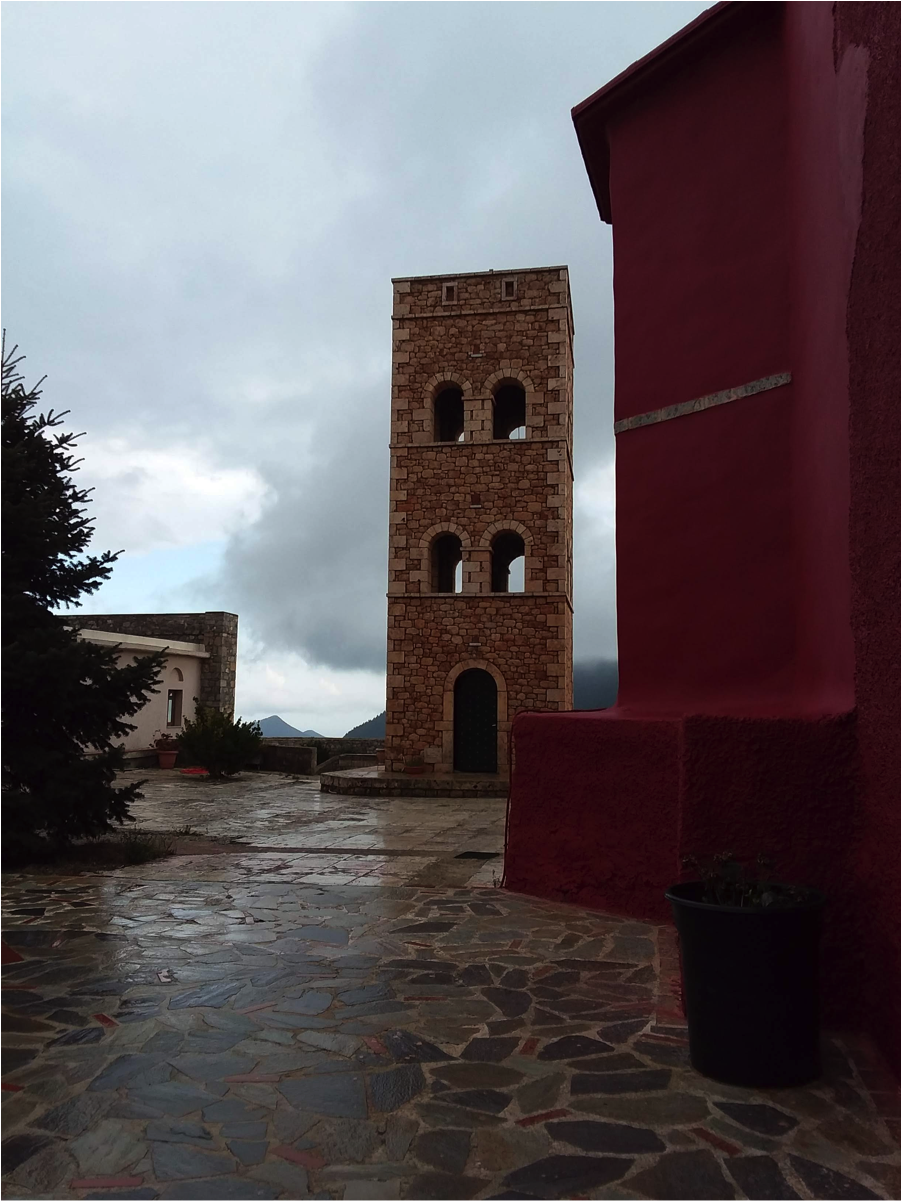
Upper courtyard and bell tower, facing southeast toward the Laconian Gulf

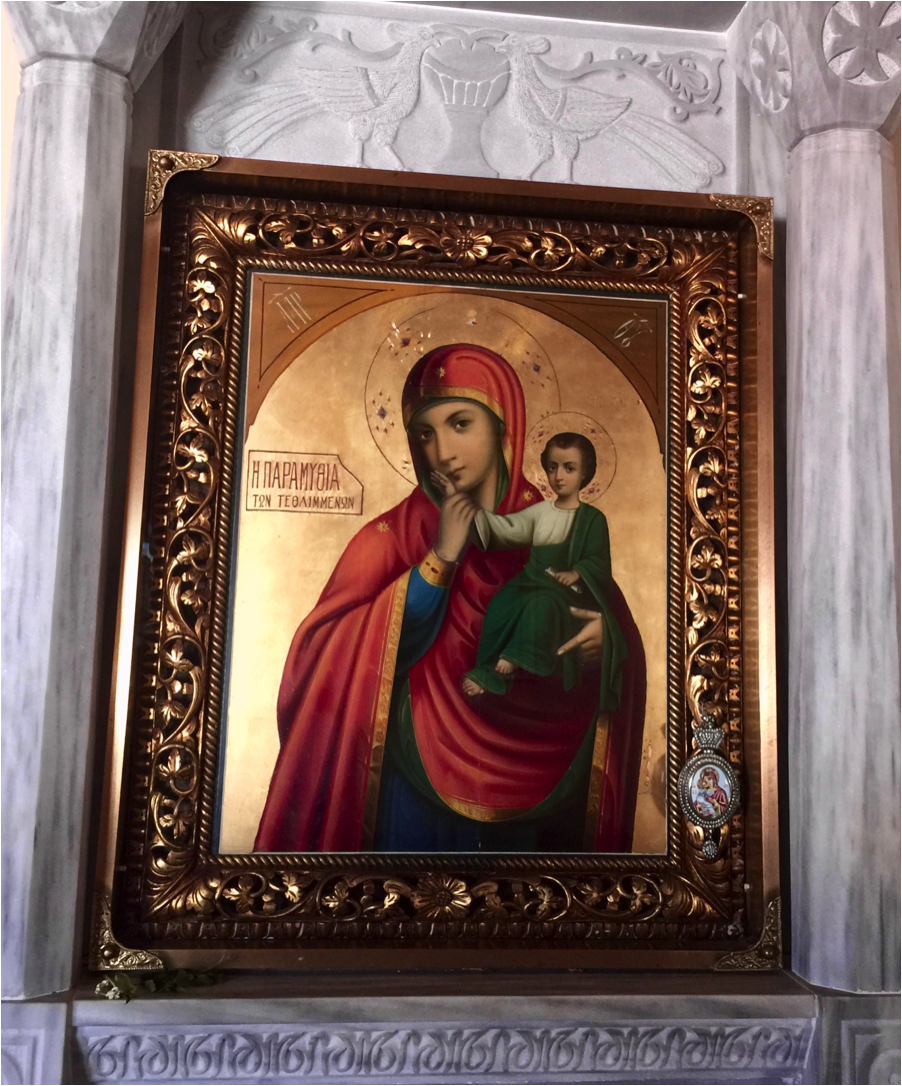
Traditional Panayia and Child iconostasis – one among a variety of types found inside the main chapel

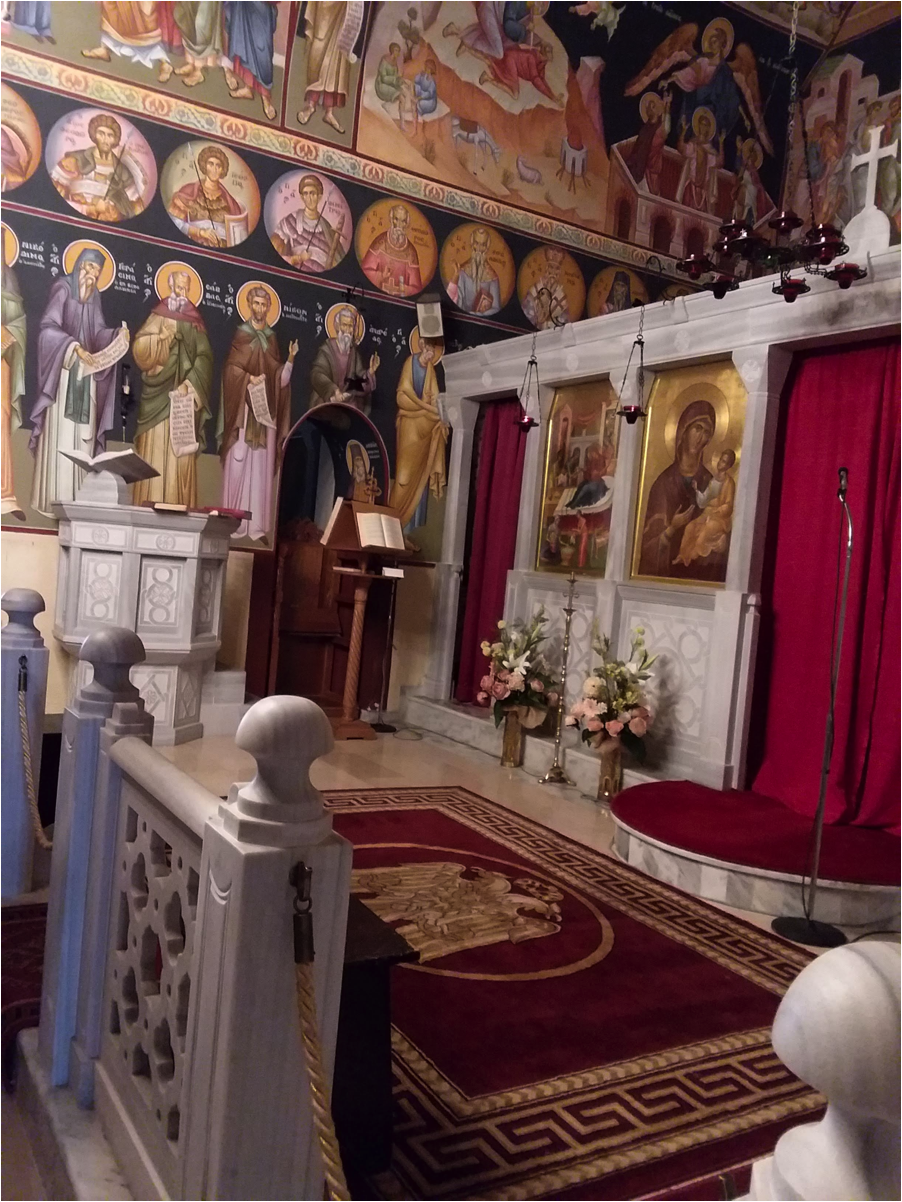
This marble Templon with Byzantine-style icons separates the nave from the altar

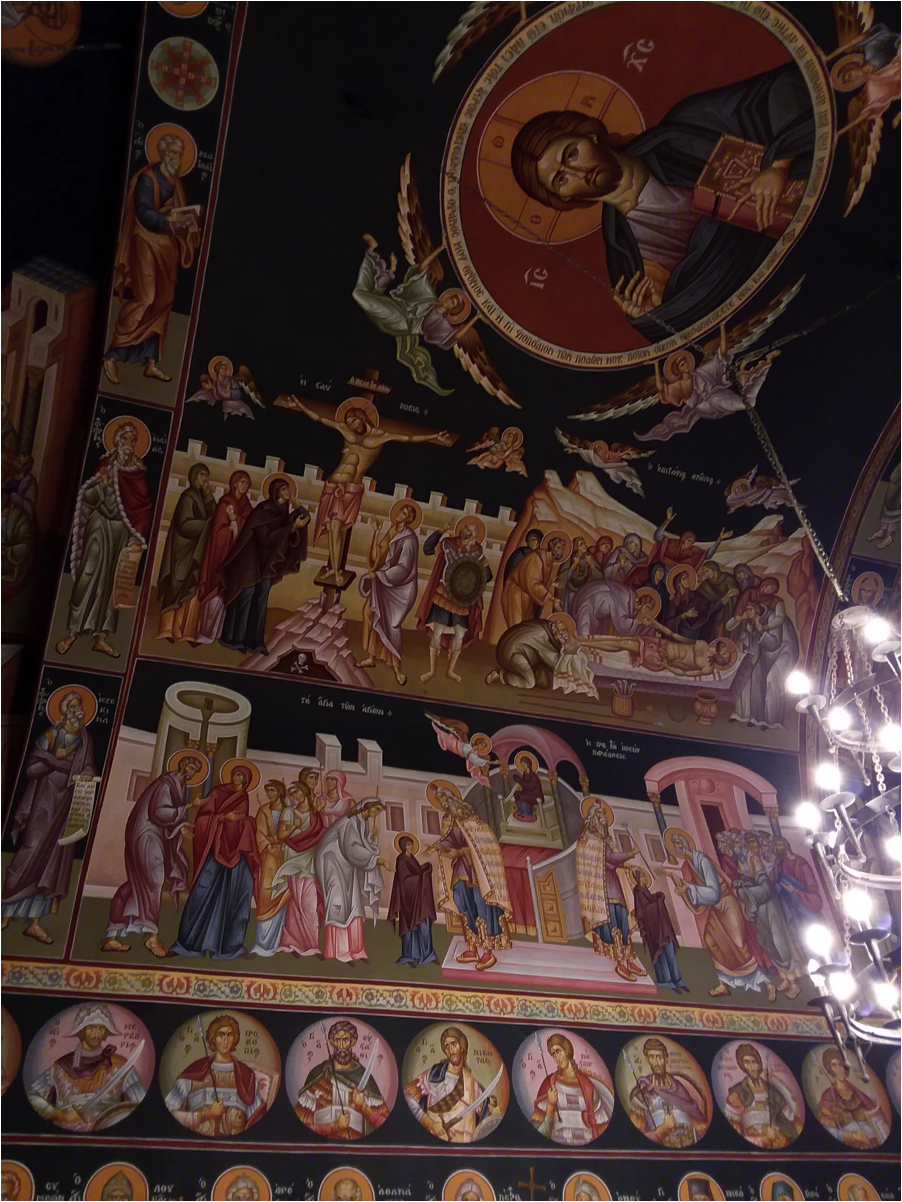
View of the “Christ Pantocrator” icon and arched ceiling/wall iconography of the main chapel

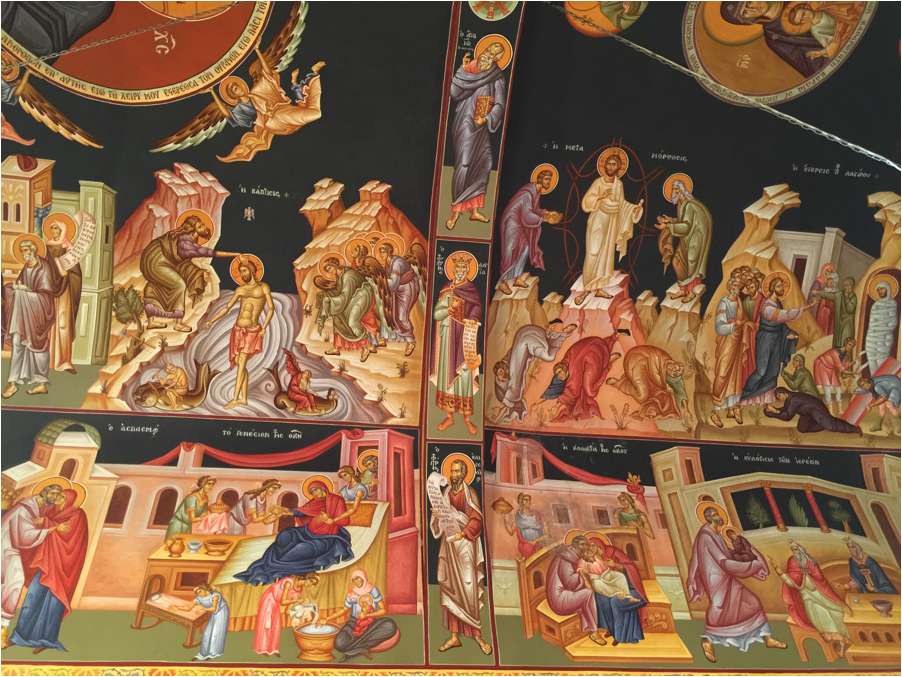
Example of iconography adorning the side walls and arched ceiling of the main chapel

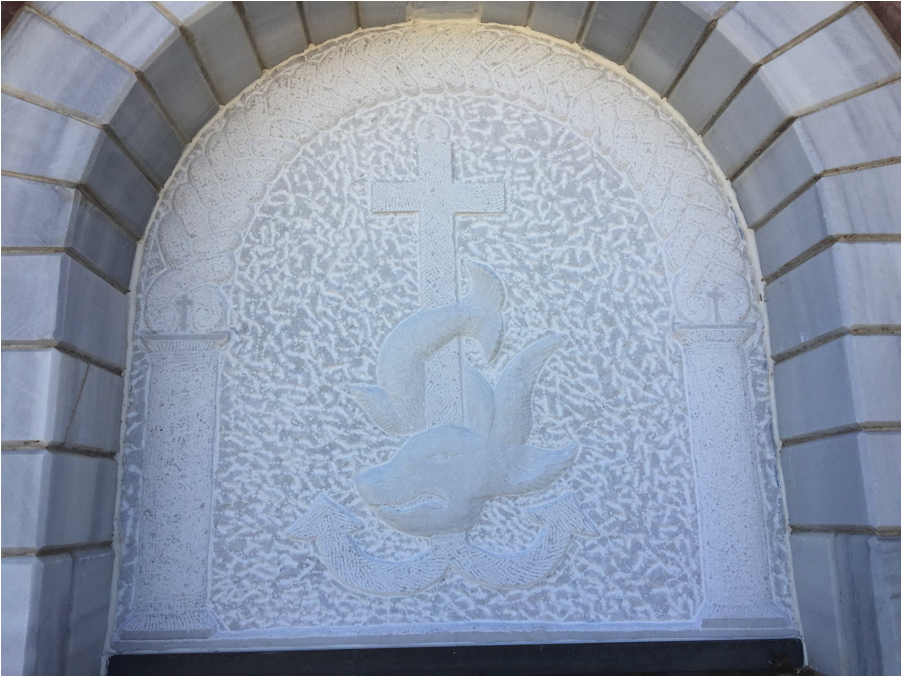
Doorway arch adornment recalling ancient nautical theme, at the lower courtyard

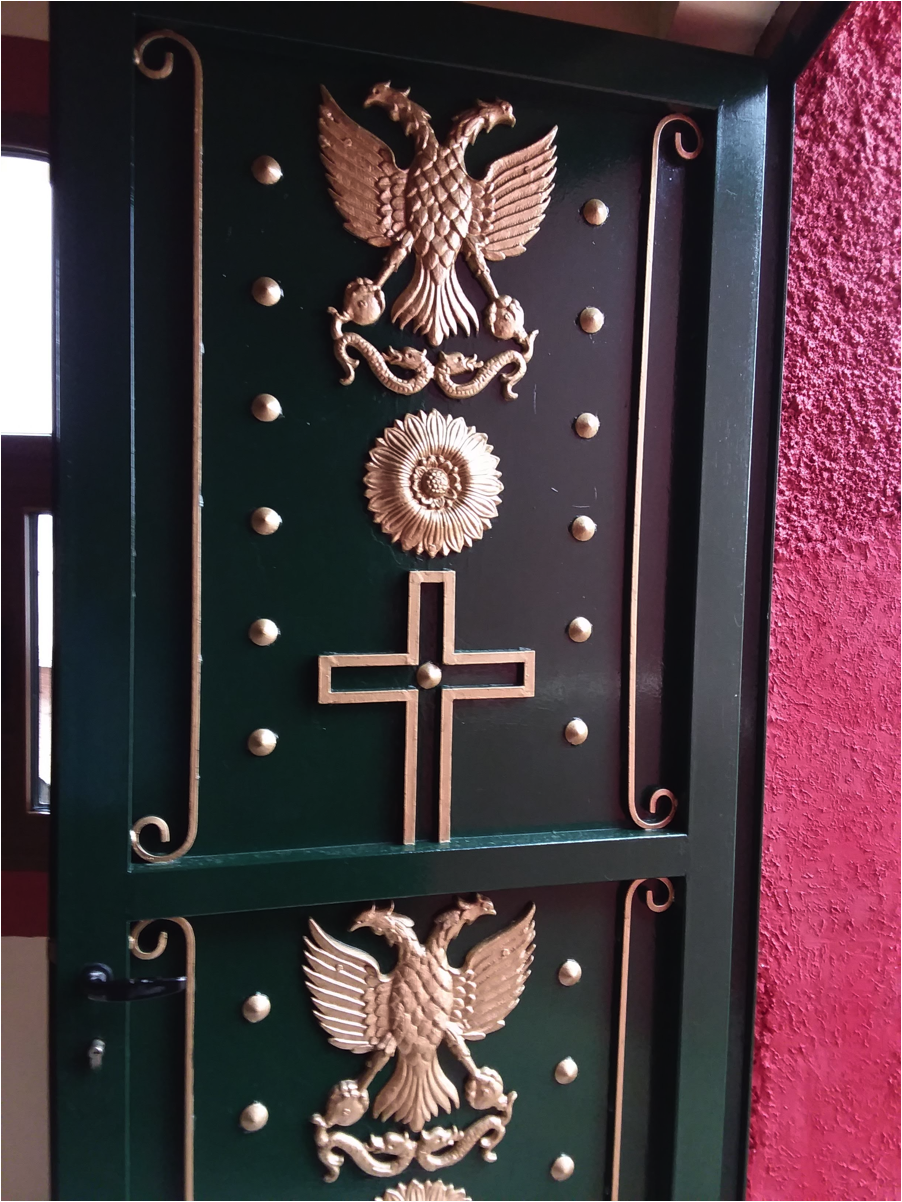
Door of the main chapel, displaying Orthodox (Byzantine) double-headed eagle and serpents

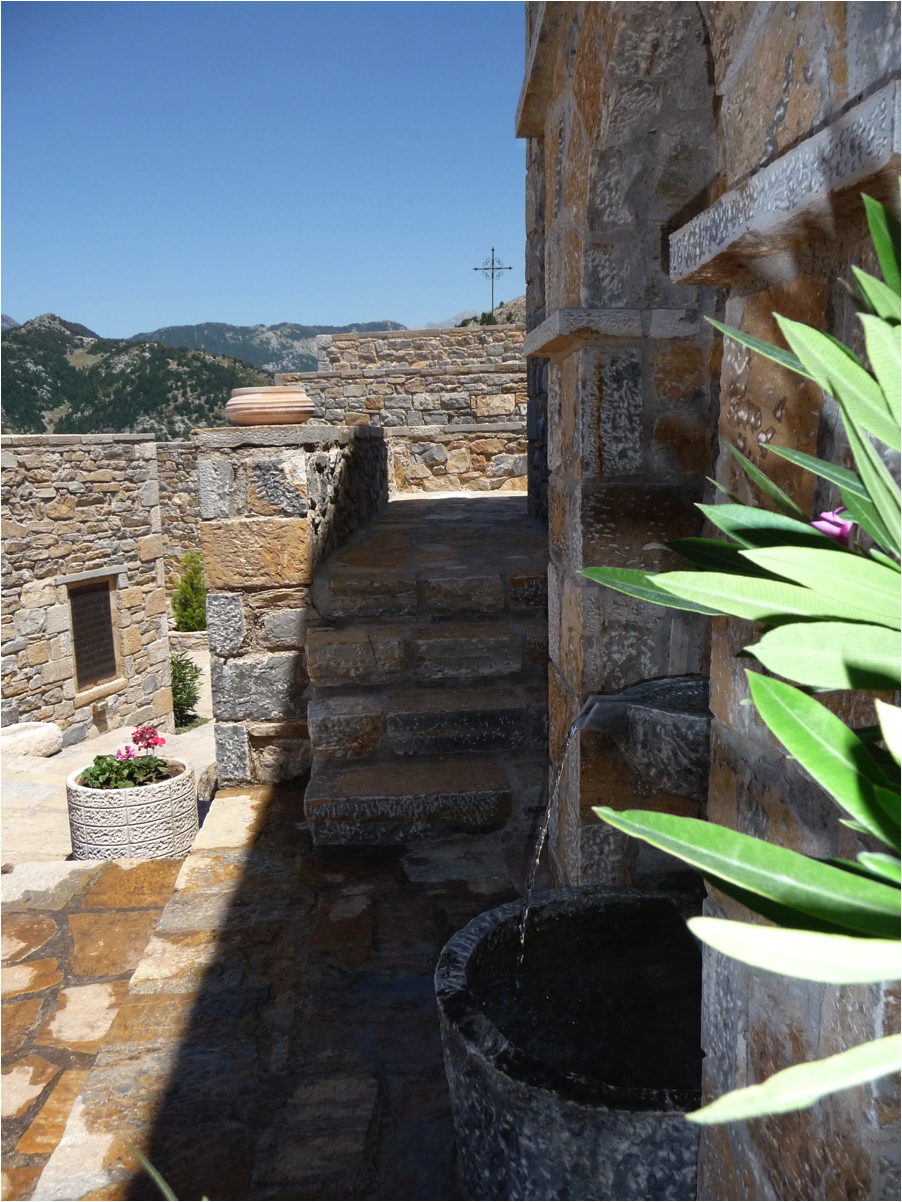
Refreshing fountain flowing with mountain spring-water inside the complex's walls

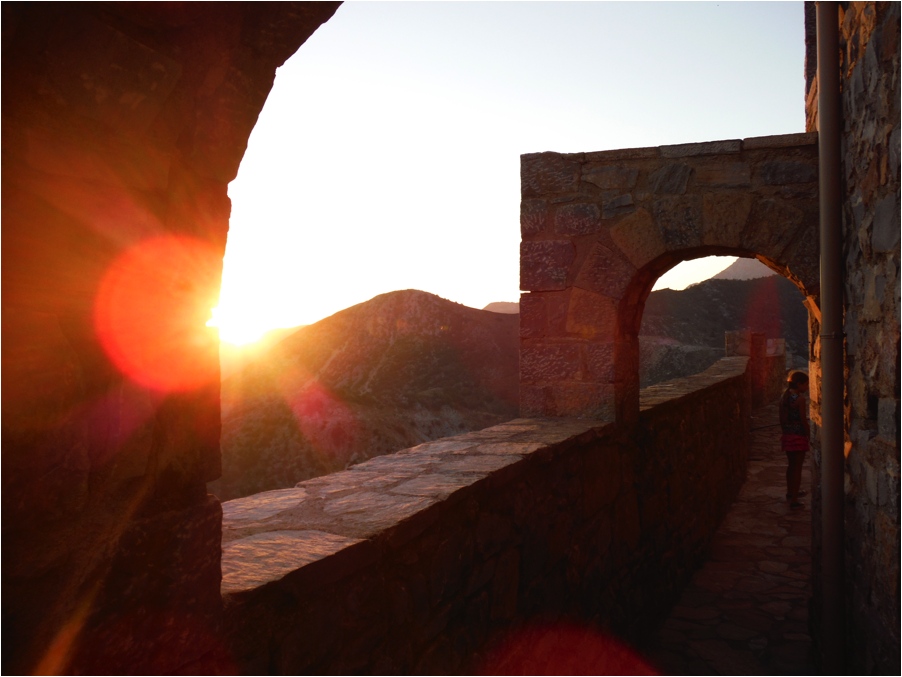
View along the western, arch-adorned rampart at sunset

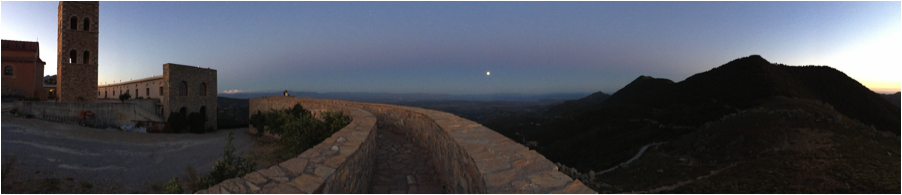
Moonrise panorama from the southern rampart

== See also ==
- Church of Greece
- List of Eastern Orthodox church buildings in Greece
- List of Greek Orthodox monasteries in Greece
