= Kladas, Greece =

Kladas Κλαδάς
- Community
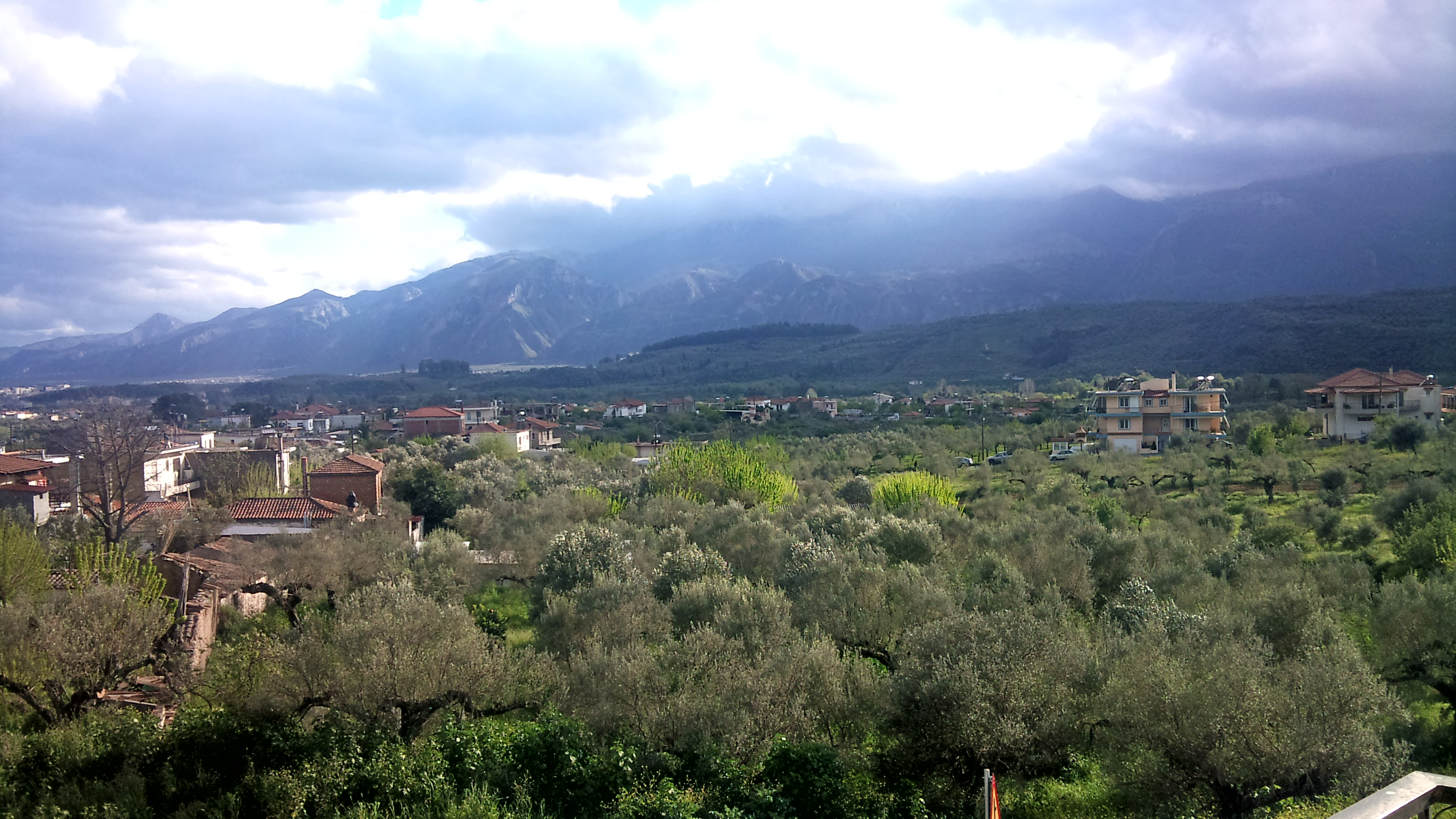
- Panoramic view of Kladas

- Location within Greece
- Coordinates: 37°4′N 22°26′E
- Country: Greece
- Administrative region: Peloponnese
- Regional unit: Laconia
- Municipality: Sparta
- Municipal unit: Sparta
- Districts: 2 (Old Village, New Village)
- Elevation: 240 m (790 ft)

Population (2021)
  - Community: 430
- Demonym: Kladèos
- Time zone: UTC+2 (EET)
  - Summer (DST): UTC+3 (EEST)
- Postal code: 231 00
- Area code: 27310 ## ###
- Vehicle registration: ΑΚ
- Website: www.sparti.gov.gr

Kladas (pronounced: Kladás, Greek: Κλαδάς) is a small village which is located about 5 kilometers north of the city of Sparta and belongs to the municipality of Sparta. The village was named after Krokodeilos Kladas, a medieval Greek military leader. Its population was 430 inhabitants (2021 census). It is a place to visit on the way to Sparti, Elafonisos, Skoutari or Kythera.

== History ==
There is no exact written date of the arrival of the first inhabitants of Kladas from nearby villages such as Vamvakou, Voutianoi, Kalivia, Vresthena and from the town of Sparta. All that is known is that the establishment of the Kladas community happened on 31 August 1912 according to Ioannis Kapodistrias self-government plan. However, 85 years later – on 04/12 1997 – the Kladas community has been incorporated to the extended municipality of Sparti.

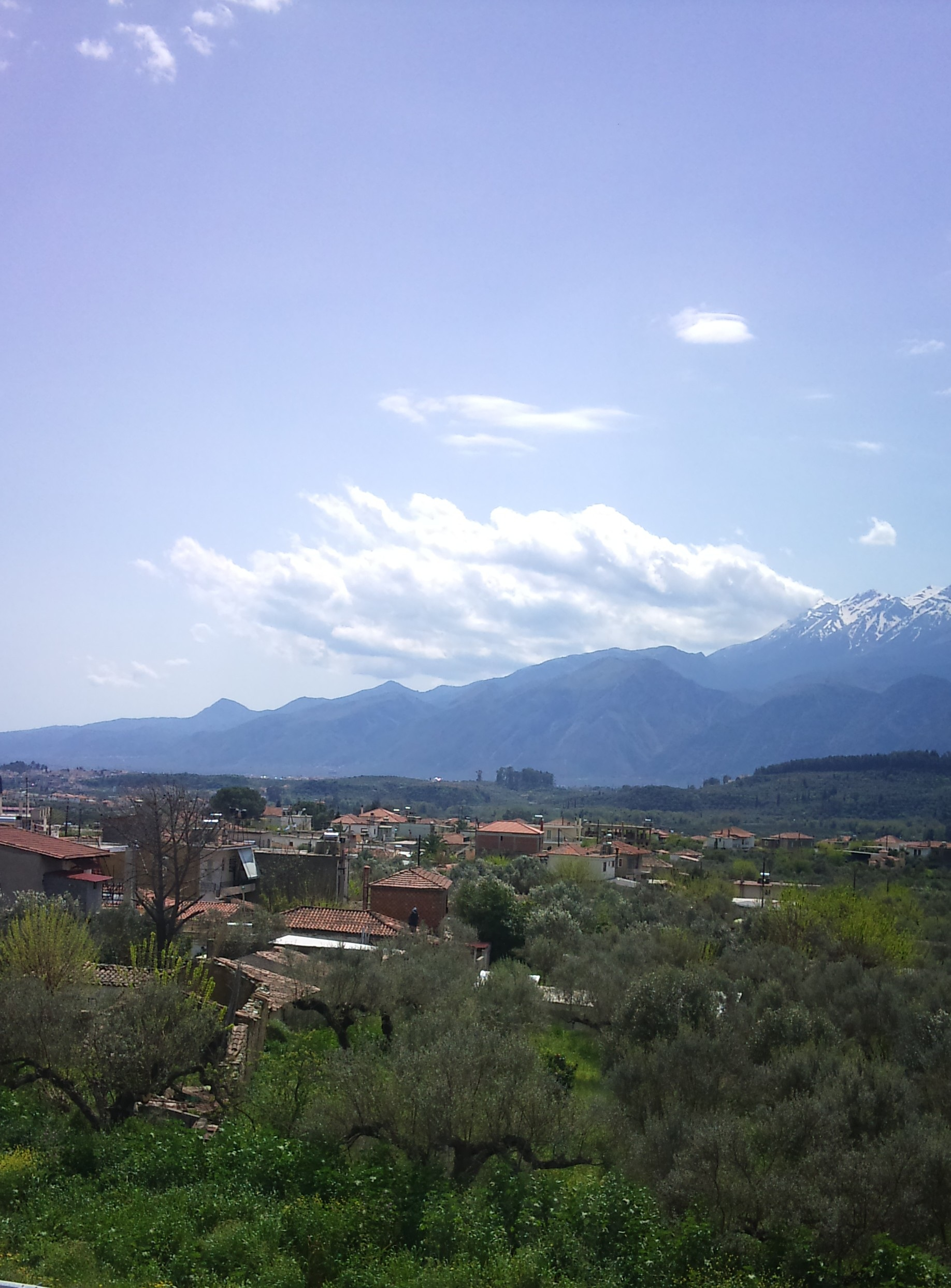
Kladas, Old Village

== Everyday life and local economy ==
Most inhabitants of the village are growers or breeders and that is the way they make a living. Olive trees are the most common cultivation at cropped lands around the village or around neighboring villages mainly in Theologos (Greek Θεολόγος). Also the people grow tomatoes, pumpkins and other vegetables in their household garden.

The village has two coffee shops, one coffee shop - tavern and one restaurant for the travelers -on the national road which connects Athens with Sparti- where the inhabitants but also the visitors gather, relax or discuss about the most recent news. Kladas has also a car station and a factory which packs products that come from the olives but there aren't any commercial stores.

== Eco-lifestyle ==
The inhabitants year by year are turning to ecologists. Several crops are now Biological with ISO certification and also certified by the European Union so the local agricultural products are equal to biological products from other European countries such as the Netherlands concerning quality. Another aspect of the eco-lifestyle is the fact that people use bicycles for their own transportation so not only they gain a clean place to live concerning the air quality but also there is no noise caused by automobiles. Finally, there is a recycling point outside the elementary school of Kladas

== Infrastructure in modern times ==
The village has been modernized in aspects like:

- The municipal waste management after the extension of the sewerage network of Sparta because the operation of the Technological Institute of Sparta (Τ.Ε.Ι. Σπάρτης) in 2005–2006
- The upgrade of the telephone/fiber network that allowed broadband connections
- The construction of the ring road of Kladas drove to the construction of new residential and rental properties.
- The construction of the New National Road which connects Athens with Sparti makes Kladas a crossroad between Sparti, the nearby villages and Athens.

== Climate ==
The climate of Kladas is temperate Mediterranean and this is also a result of the geological factors such as the elevation (240 meters) but also the fact that the village is situated between mountain Parnonas and mountain Taygetos. The average yearly temperature is + 19 °C and the average yearly amount of rain is 600 mm (24 in), the average nebulousness is 4 and the average wind power is 4 Beaufort. In the Fall and in the Winter, fog and ice are common phenomena but the snowstorms aren't that common and they mostly have a duration less than four days.

== Education ==
The village has an elementary school for the students of the 3rd and the 4th grades. The rest grades are in Aphision also known as Aphisou (Greek: Αφίσιον/Αφισού and in Kokkinorachi (Greek: Κοκκινόραχη) according to the new administrative plan of the Greek Ministry of Education which has been applied since 1997 after the expansion of the municipality of Sparti which included the community of Kladas and other villages in its own wider area as the northern suburbs. The Junior High School and the Senior High School of Sparti are located within the main city of Sparti. The students are being transferred to their schools with the local community bus (ΚΤΕΛ) under the auspices of the Greek State.

Also there is a hill that belongs to the region of Kladas where is situated the Technological Educational Institute of Sparti (Greek: Τ.Ε.Ι. Σπάρτης) that supports the department of Technology, Informatics and Telecommunications. According to ΦΕΚ 189/14-10-2004/Τ.Α´/ΠΔ 211 the operation occurred in the academic year 2005-2006. The goal of the T.E.I. of Sparti is the scientific and technological development in the fields of Information Technology and Telecommunications because it's essential to meet the needs arising in all areas of productive procedure.

== Transportation ==
Kladas or Sparti can be reached by car, taxi or the regional bus (KTEL (Greece)/ΚΤΕΛ) KTEL Schedule
