= Babis Petrakos =

Greek footballer (born in 1991)

Personal information
- Full name: Charalampos Petrakos
- Date of birth: 1 October 1991 (age 35)
- Place of birth: Sparta, Laconia, Greece
- Height: 1.84 m (6 ft 1/2 in)
- Position: Midfielder

Team information
- Current team: Zakynthos F.C.

Youth career
- –1997: Atromitos Diavatou

Senior career*
Years	Team	Apps	(Gls)
2009–2011	Naoussa F.C.	45	(10)
2011–2012	Iraklis	5	(0)
2012–2013	Zakynthos F.C.	20	(1)
- * Club domestic league appearances and goals as of 8 February 2012

Charalampos "Babis" Petrakos (Greek: Χαράλαμπος "Μπάμπης" Πετράκος; born 1 October 1991) is a Greek footballer who is currently a free agent.

== Career ==
Born in Sparti, Laconia, Petrakos began playing football as a youth for Atromitos Diavatou. As central midfielder he had about 75 appearances and 35 goals at youth level.

He joined Naoussa F.C. in 2009 where in two years he had 45 appearances and 10 goals as central midfielder and defender.

In 2011, he joined Pontioi Katerinis F.C. participating in Football League 2 (Greece).
Petrakos made his debut for Pontioi Katerinis F.C. and in professional league football against Megas Alexandros Irakleia F.C.
In the Greek Cup he played against Vyzas F.C. and also started in the cup against Xanthi but was replaced at half time.

Ιn the middle of the year Pontioi Katerinis F.C. merged with Iraklis. The new team was named "AEP Iraklis 1908" and Petrakos continued as a member of the new squad. He was released on 6 April 2012.
