= Konstantinos Kolokotronis =

Greek brigade leader (c. 1745 – 1780)

- Born: c. 1745
- Died: 19 July 1780; Kastania, Morea Eyalet, Ottoman Empire (now Greece)
- Burial place: Milea, Messenia
- Spouse: Zampia Kotsaki
- Children: Theodoros Kolokotronis; Markos Kolokotronis
- Relatives: Ioannis Kolokotronis (father); Anagnostis Kolokotronis (brother); Panos Kolokotronis (grandson); Ioannis Kolokotronis (grandson)
- Military career
- Allegiance: Greek Revolutionaries
- Conflicts: Orlov Revolt; Siege of Kastania †

Konstantinos Kolokotronis (Greek: Κωνσταντίνος Κολοκοτρώνης; c. 1745 – 1780) was a Greek klepht leader in the third quarter of the 18th century in the Peloponnese, and the father of Theodoros Kolokotronis, one of the leaders of the Greek War of Independence.

== Biography ==
Born around 1745, he was one of the five children of Ioannis Kolokotronis. He was of medium height and was dark-skinned. When he was still young he worked as an armatole in Corinth under the command of Halil Bey for four years. He developed close connections with some of the most influential families of the Peloponnese and soon accumulated significant power himself, to the point of influencing the choice of the Ottoman governors (vali) of the Peloponnese. During his four years of service under Halil Bey, he developed the plan of driving the Turks out of the Peloponnese. He became close friends with the renowned klepht Panagiotaros. In 1762 he quit his job as an armatole, climbed the mountain Taygetus and with Panagiotaros's help built a fort at Kastania, Laconia of Mani and two small houses close to it. From there he began launching raids against the Turks.

In 1770, he took part in the Orlov Revolt and the battles that followed, where his father and two of his brothers were killed. He fought the Turks across the Peloponnese. In one ambush at the bridge of Birbaga in Katsana he managed to kill one of the most infamous leaders of the Albanian irregulars, Bekiaris, along with 36 of his men. At another incident, near Androusa, he managed to kill another well known Albanian leader called Veizos and 24 of his men. With these deeds, he managed to encourage around 5,000 Greeks to go to the mountains and become klephts. On 10 June 1779 along with other Greek klepht leaders and 3,000 men he participated in the so-called "massacre of the Albanians", in which the Ottoman Kapudan Pasha Cezayirli Gazi Hasan Pasha destroyed 12,000 Albanian irregulars and ended their depredations in the Peloponnese. Hasan Pasha soon turned against him, and gathered ships and 14,000 men and landed at Gytheio to capture him. Kolokotronis and Panagiotaros made their last stand at the Siege of Kastania (1780). After ten days of tense fighting, the besieged men, women and children, being low on ammunition, made a sortie, where Panagiotaros was captured alive and killed. Kolokotronis received an almost fatal blow from a sword, escaped temporarily and hid in the bushes, but due to suffering from his wound and high fever he sought help in the open. While he was dying, he was found by 7 Turkish Vardouniots, who beheaded him. They threw his head in a hole and his body over a cliff. His body was later recovered intact due to low temperatures and was buried subsequently in the village of Milea, Messenia.

== Sources ==
- Article from the Ethnos(Έθνος) newspaper : "History Of The Greek Nation Theodoros Kolokotronis General Of The Greeks" pages 8–13
- Μεγάλη Στρατιωτική και Ναυτική Εγκυκλοπαιδεία, Τόμος 5, Ν-Σ. Αθήνα: Έκδοσις Μεγάλης Στρατιωτικής και Ναυτικής Εγκυκλοπαιδείας. 1929. pp. 677, 685, 693 και 701.
