= Faris, Greece =

Faris Φάρις
- Municipal unit
- Location within the regional unit

- Location within Greece
- Coordinates: 36°57′N 22°26′E
- Country: Greece
- Administrative region: Peloponnese
- Regional unit: Laconia
- Municipality: Sparti

Area
  - Municipal unit: 183.7 km^{2} (70.9 sq mi)

Population (2021)
  - Municipal unit: 2,898
  - Municipal unit density: 15.78/km^{2} (40.86/sq mi)
- Time zone: UTC+2 (EET)
  - Summer (DST): UTC+3 (EEST)
- Vehicle registration: AK

Faris (Greek: Φάρις) is a former municipality in Laconia, Peloponnese, Greece. Since the 2011 local government reform it is part of the municipality Sparti, of which it is a municipal unit. The municipal unit has an area of 183.667 km^{2}. Population 2,898 (2021). The seat of the municipality was in Xirokampi.
