= Kastania, Pieria =

Kastania Καστανιά
- Community
- Location within Greece
- Coordinates: 40°27.5′N 22°24′E
- Country: Greece
- Administrative region: Central Macedonia
- Regional unit: Pieria
- Municipality: Pydna-Kolindros
- Municipal unit: Kolindros
- Elevation: 350 m (1,150 ft)

Population (2021)
  - Community: 251
- Time zone: UTC+2 (EET)
  - Summer (DST): UTC+3 (EEST)
- Postal code: 600 61
- Area code: +30-2351
- Vehicle registration: KN

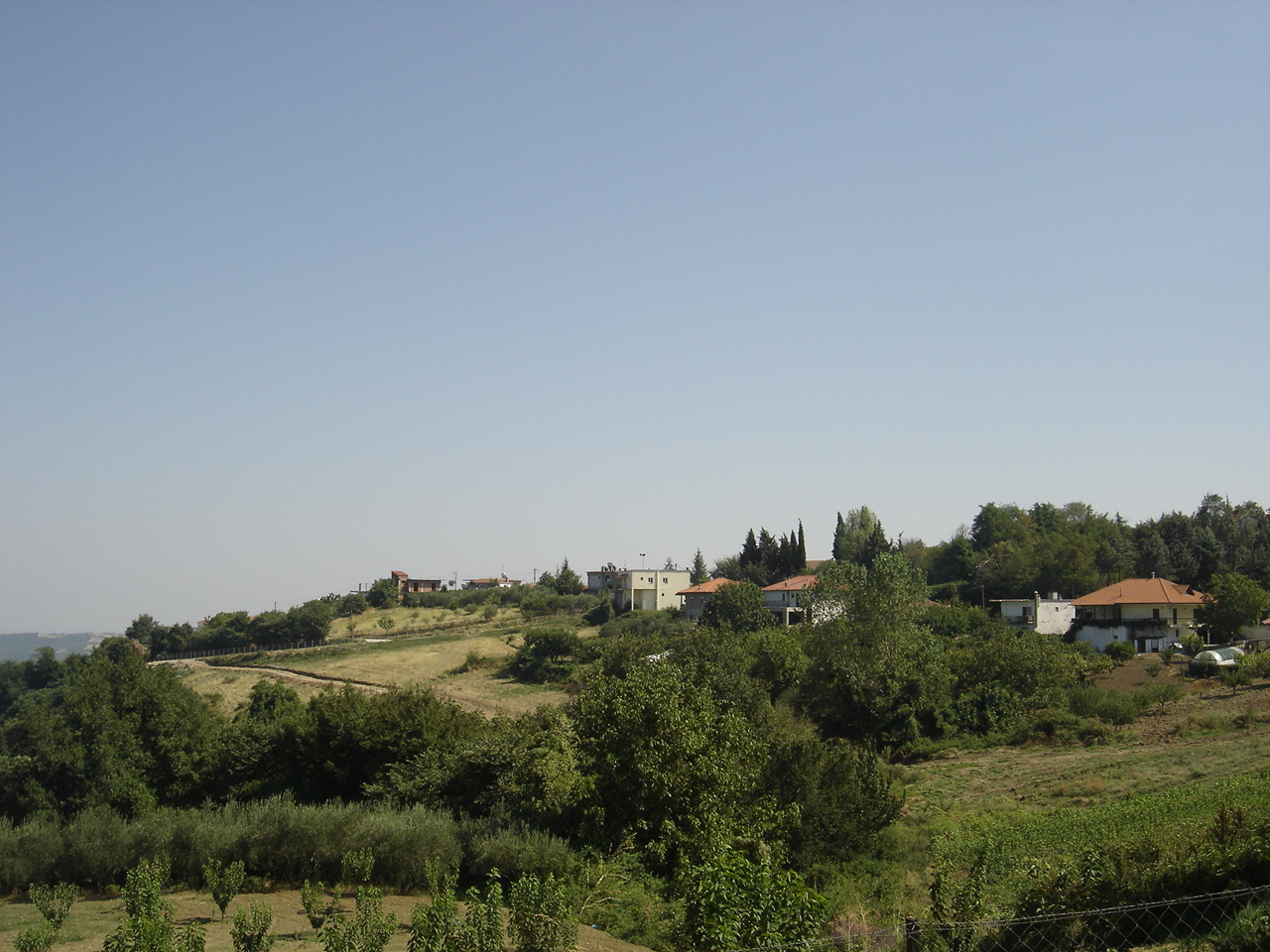
A view from Kastania, Pieria.

Kastania (Greek: Καστανιά) is a village in Pieria, Greece. Since the 2011 local government reform it is part of the municipality Pydna-Kolindros, of which it is a municipal community. The 2021 census recorded 251 residents in the village.
