= Siege of Kastania =

Fought in July 1780

| Date | 1780 |
| Location | Kastania, Mani 36°50′33″N 22°24′00″E |
| Result | Ottoman victory |

Belligerents
| Maniots; Klephts | Ottoman Empire |

Commanders and leaders
| Konstantinos Kolokotronis †; Panagiotaros Venetsakis † | Ali Bey |

Strength
| About 400 men and civilians | 10,000 men |

Casualties and losses
| Unknown | Unknown |
- Siege location

The siege of Kastania was fought in July 1780 between the Maniots and the klephts under Konstantinos Kolokotronis and Panagiotaros Venetsakis and the Ottoman Empire under Ali Bey.

== Prelude ==
The Orlov Revolt of 1770 was a disaster for the Greeks that revolted against the Ottomans, particularly the Maniots, who were the only free Greeks in mainland Greece. The Ottomans forced the Maniots to pay tribute annually and to have a bey who came from Mani. Even though the Maniots were bottled by the fierce Turko-Albanian soldiers who ravaged the Peloponnese they still managed to cause damage to the Ottomans with their pirate ships and with raids into Laconia. Amongst the most prominent were Konstantinos Kolokotronis and Panagiotaros Venetsakis.

From their towers in Kastania they attacked Ottoman lands and caused much damage. The pasha of the Peloponnese, Cezayirli Gazi Hasan Pasha, was preparing his invasion of Mani and decided that it was necessary to exterminate the Kastania menace. When his fleet arrived at Gytheio he sent 10,000 men under the command of his second in command, Ali Bey, to deal with them.

== Siege ==
The Maniots had heard that Ali Bey and Panagiotaros sent a man to his father-in-law Tzanetos Grigorakis to bring a relief force. But Tzanetos was busy preparing the rest of the Maniot army with his uncle Exarchos Grigorakis near their home town of Skoutari. They resigned to the fact that they would have to fight alone.

By the time the Ottomans reached Kastania from Gytheio the defenders were ready for the siege. The Maniots had gathered ammunition and food to last for around a dozen days. They tried to evacuate the children and women but their attempt were thwarted by the fact that they refused to go. The defence was mainly concentrated around Kolokotronis', Panagiotaros' and Panagiotaros' father's tower-houses. The elder Panagiotaros was over 80 years old at the time and had been a renowned klepht when he was younger.

Ali Bey sent a man to the defenders offering to call off the siege if Kolokotronis and Panagiotaros each gave him one of their children. The Maniots refused and the Ottomans began the siege. The Ottomans had trouble bombarding the tower-houses because they were well built and had been strengthened before the Ottomans arrived. They also had trouble because the Maniots were shielded from the artillery while the Ottomans were exposed to the Maniot fire.

The siege had dragged on for ten days and the situation was becoming grave for the defenders. During the night of the tenth day, Panagiotaros, his father and Kolokotronis met to discuss the situation. They only had ammunition to last for two days and after that ran out the defence was doomed. They came to the conclusion that on the twelfth night at midnight when the moon didn't shine they would sneak out and make for the forests around the town with a group of men covering the rear and the vanguard while the women and the children were in the middle. Panagiotaros' father however said that he would stay behind and with his wife and one attendant would place his remaining gunpowder on the top floor and wait until the tower was full of Turko-Albanians then he would detonate the gunpowder and kill as many enemies as possible.

On the twelfth night they broke out from the tower-houses and tried to make it to the forests. The Ottomans heard the movements and they attacked the fleeing Maniots. The men tried to hold off the Ottomans while the women and the children escaped. Kolokotronis fell fighting seven Ottomans with his sword and pistol in hand. His head was cut off and put on a spear. His wife with his young son Theodoros Kolokotronis, the future hero of the Greek War of Independence, escaped. Panagiotaros died while protecting his family from the Ottomans. Only 100 people made it to safety. The elder Venetsakis was betrayed by his attendant and had both his feet cut off along with one of his hands. The Ottomans then hung him from the mast of one of their ships.

== Aftermath ==
The victorious Ottomans then were routed by the combined Maniot forces under the command of Tzanetos and Exarchos Grigorakis. Exarchos was treacherously captured and hung. In retaliation the Maniots sacked the Ottoman castle of Passavas. Panagiotaros' children were captured and were given an Ottoman education and later on became officers in the Ottoman army. All of Kolokotronis' children except for Theodoros were captured but they were ransomed later on. Panagiotaros' and Kolokotronis' heads were sent to the sultan.
