= Sparta (modern city) =

City in Greece

Sparta Σπάρτη
- Municipality
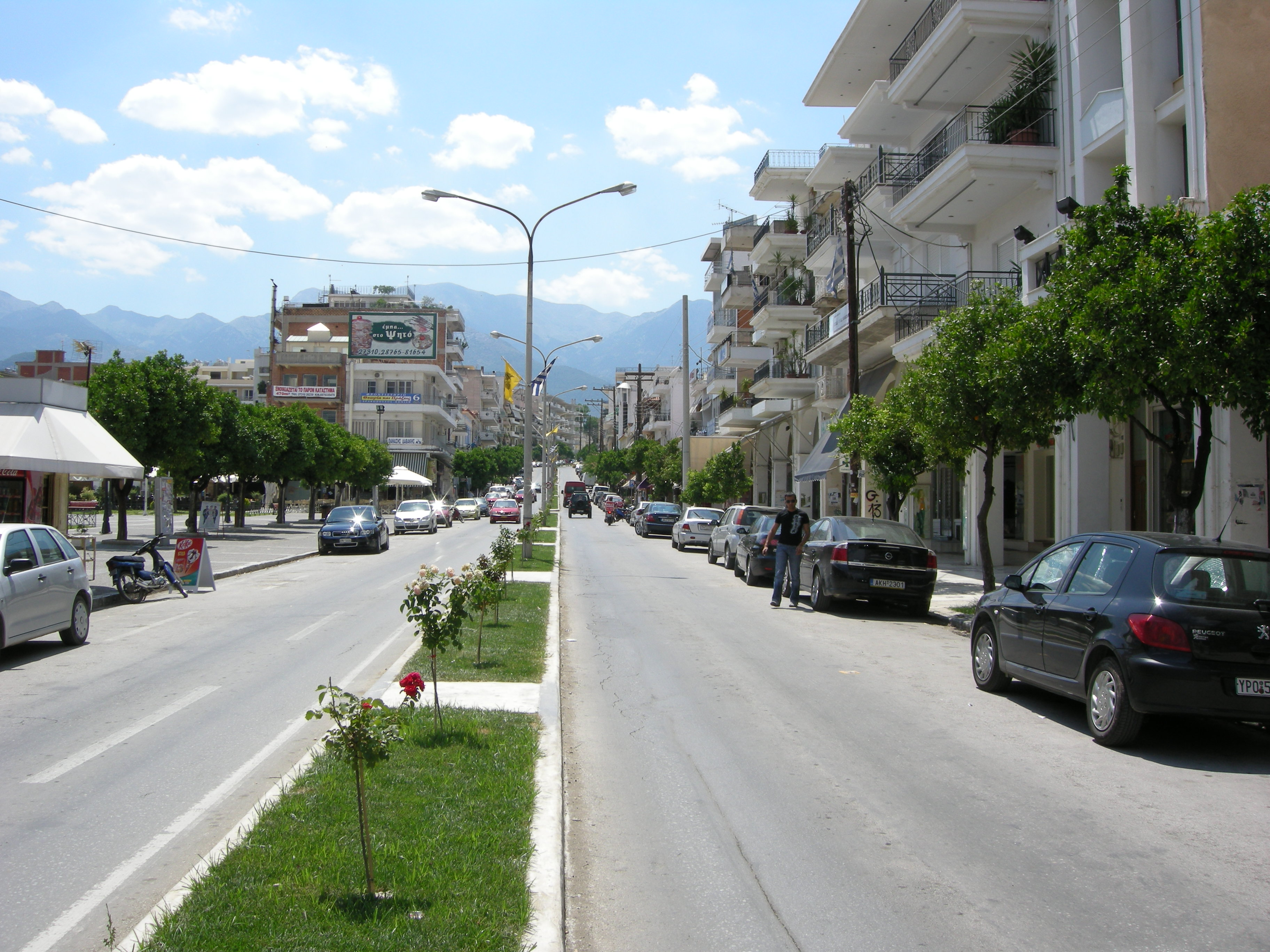
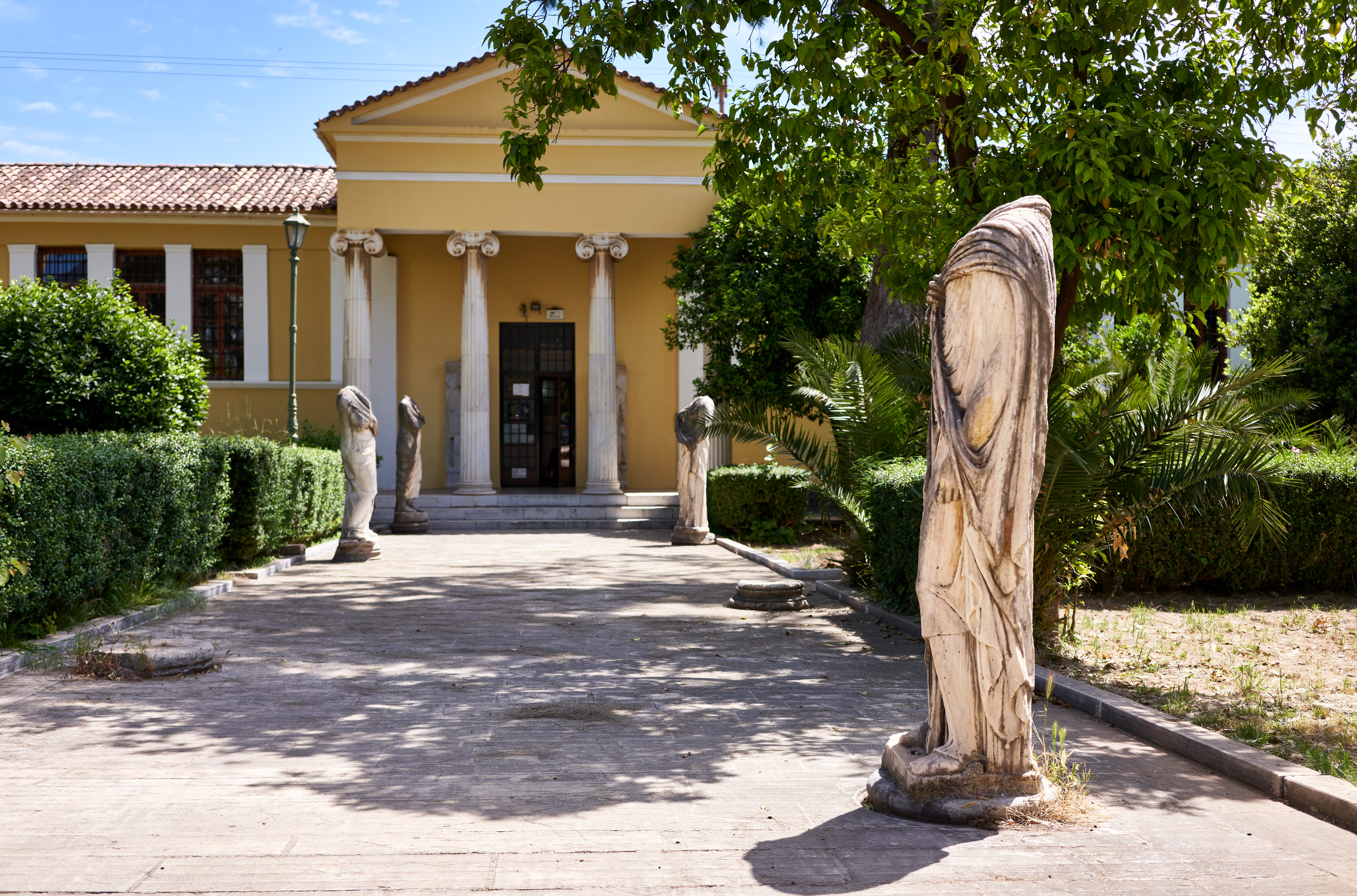
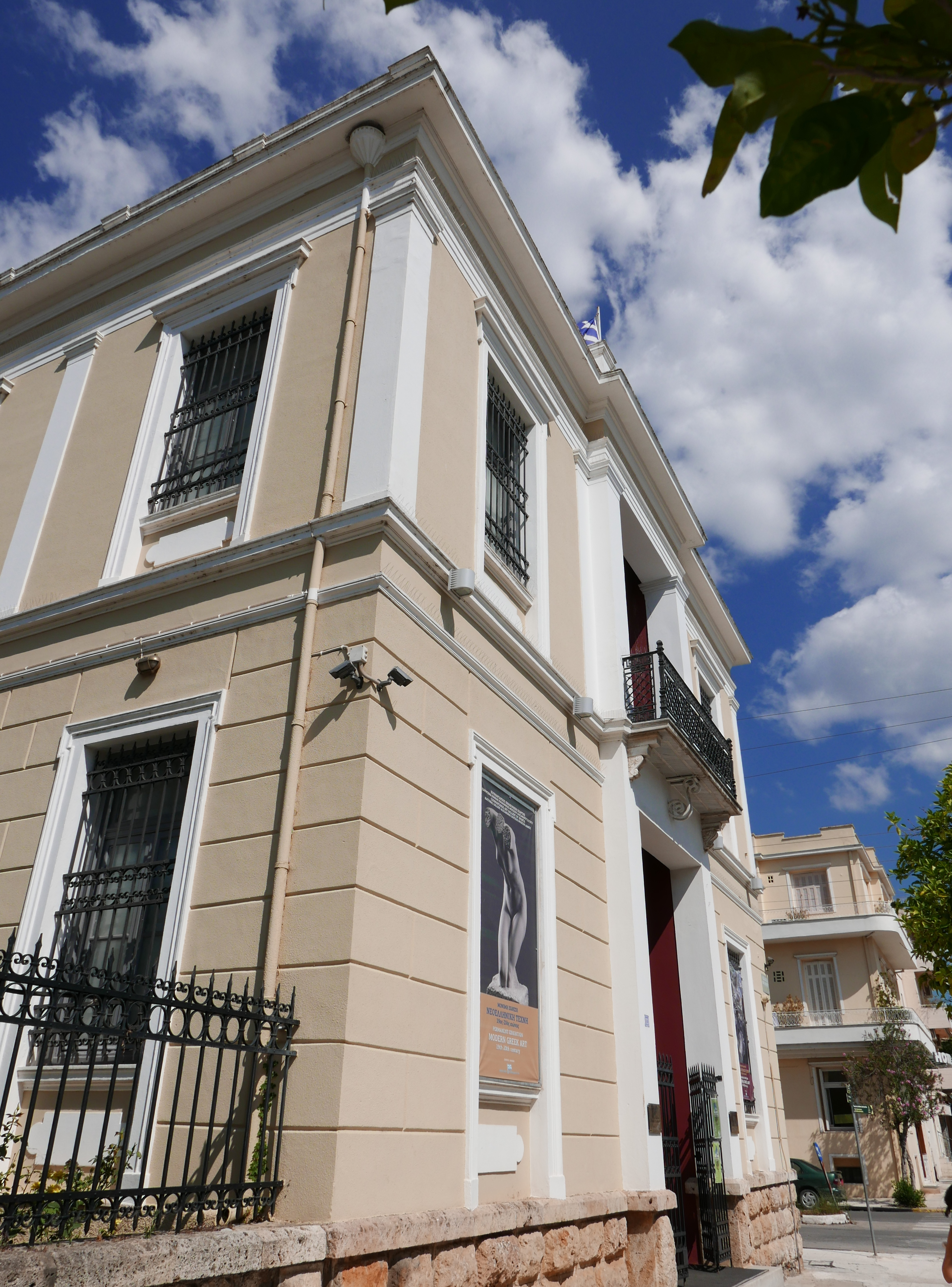
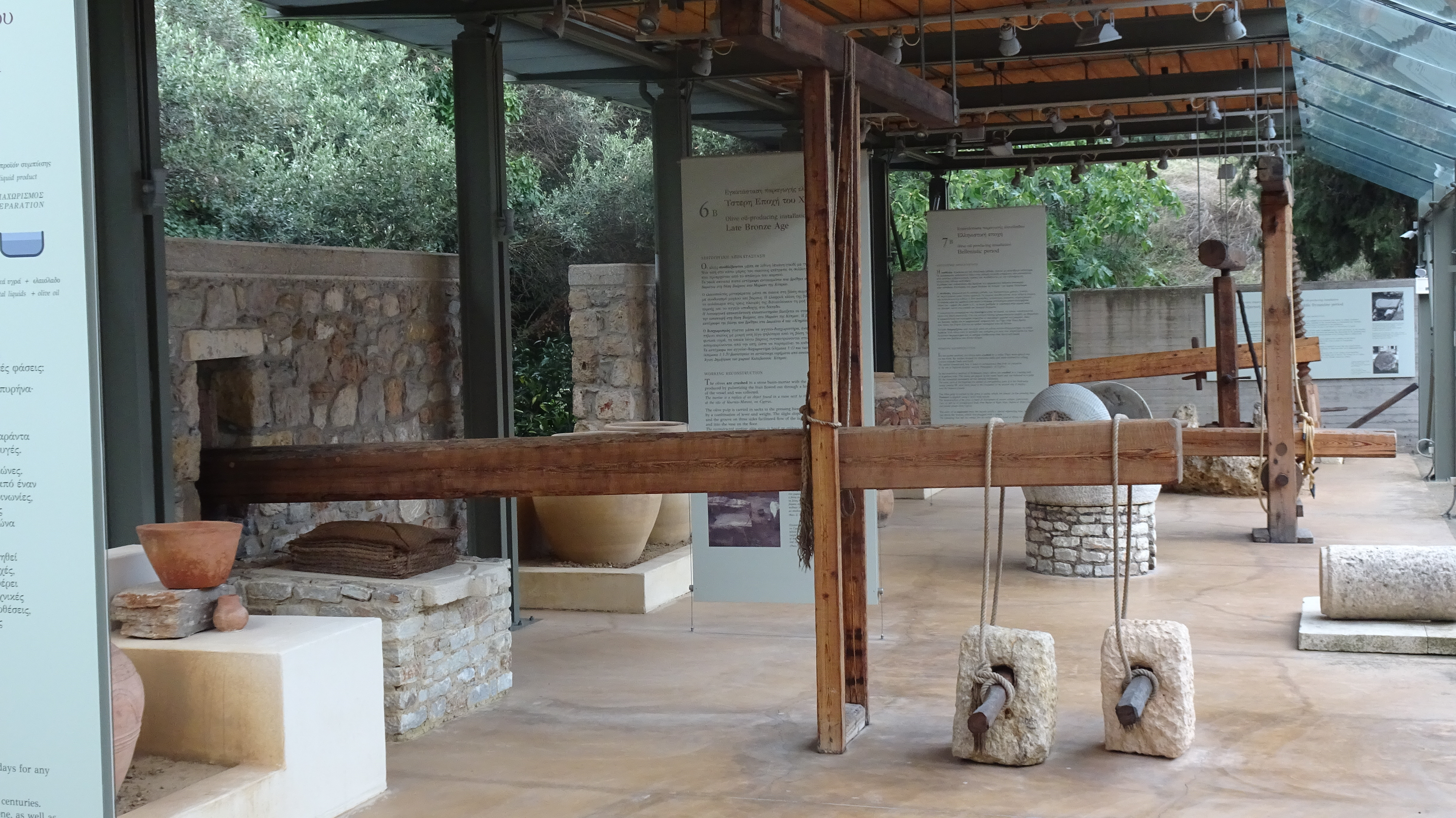
- Clockwise from top: Sparta's Town Hall, Gkortsologou Street, Archaeological Museum of Sparta, Koumantareios gallery on Balasaki House, Olive and Greek Olive Oil Museum, Statue of Leonidas, Spartathlon monument

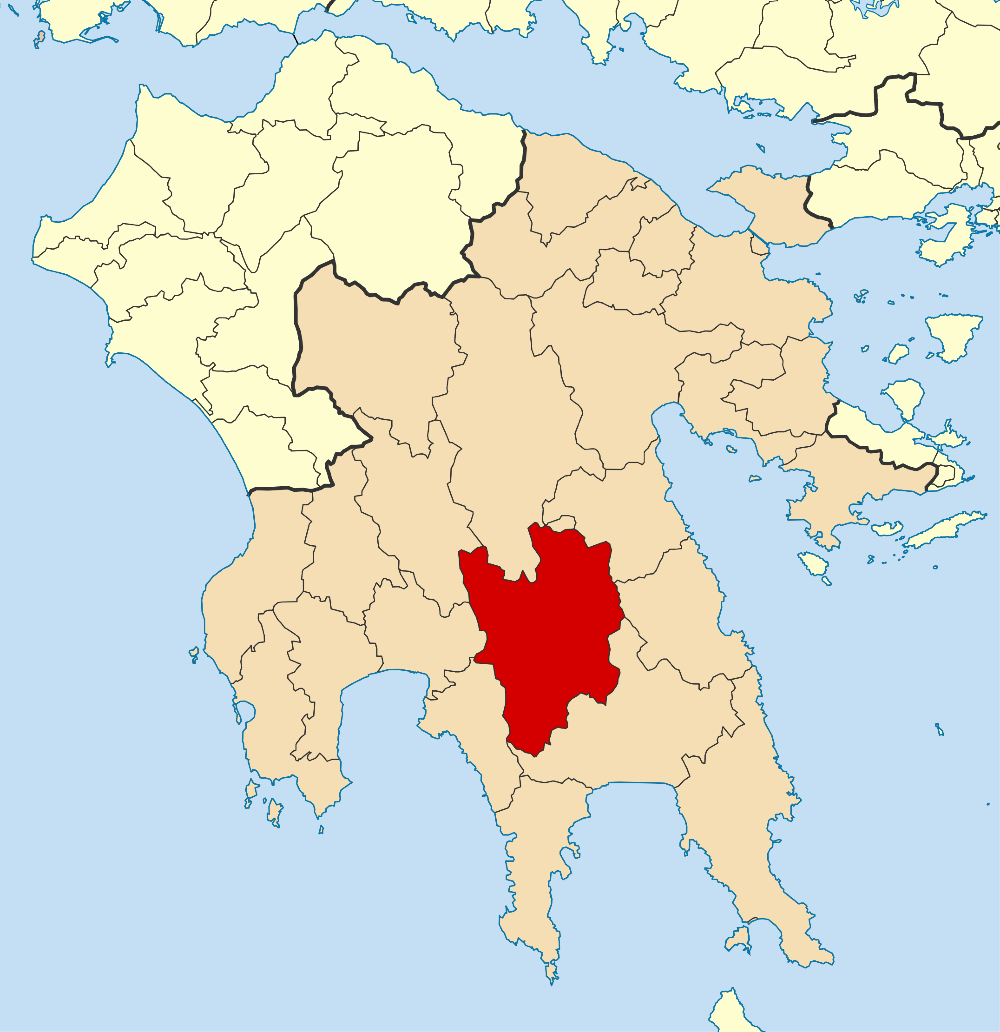

- Location within Greece
- Coordinates: 37°04′26″N 22°25′46″E
- Country: Greece
- Administrative region: Peloponnese
- Regional unit: Laconia
- City established: 1834 (on the site of ancient Sparta)

Government
  - Mayor: Michail Vakalopoulos (since 2023)

Area
  - Municipality: 1,181.8 km^{2} (456.3 sq mi)
  - Municipal unit: 84.5 km^{2} (32.6 sq mi)
- Lowest elevation: 200 m (660 ft)

Population (2021)
  - Municipality: 32,786
  - Density: 27.742/km^{2} (71.853/sq mi)
  - Municipal unit: 19,865
  - Municipal unit density: 235/km^{2} (609/sq mi)
  - Community: 17,773
- Demonym: Spartan(s)
- Time zone: UTC+2 (EET)
  - Summer (DST): UTC+3 (EEST)
- Postal code: 231 00
- Area code: 27310
- Vehicle registration: ΑΚ
- Website: www.sparti.gov.gr

Sparta (Greek: Σπάρτη, Spárti [ˈsparti]) is a city and municipality in the Peloponnese region of Greece, serving as the capital of the Laconia regional unit. It lies at the site of ancient Sparta within the Evrotas Valley. The municipality was merged with six nearby municipalities in 2011, for a total population of 32,786 as of 2021, of whom 17,773 live in the city.

== History ==
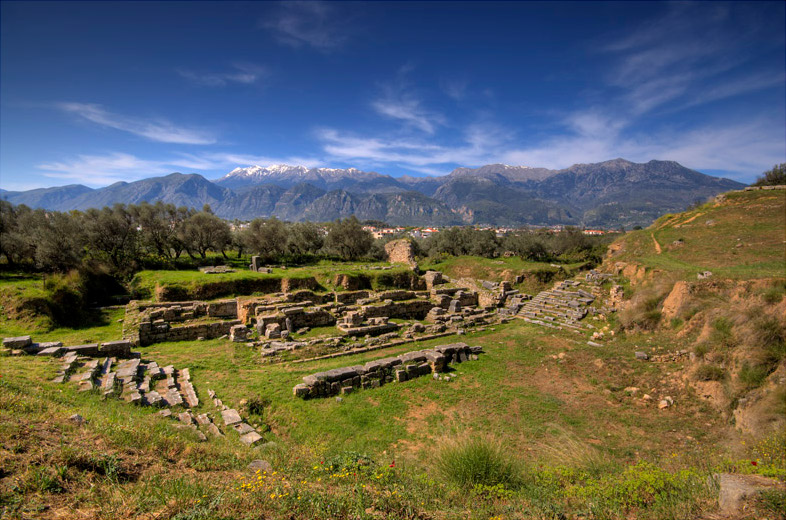
Ancient theatre of Sparta

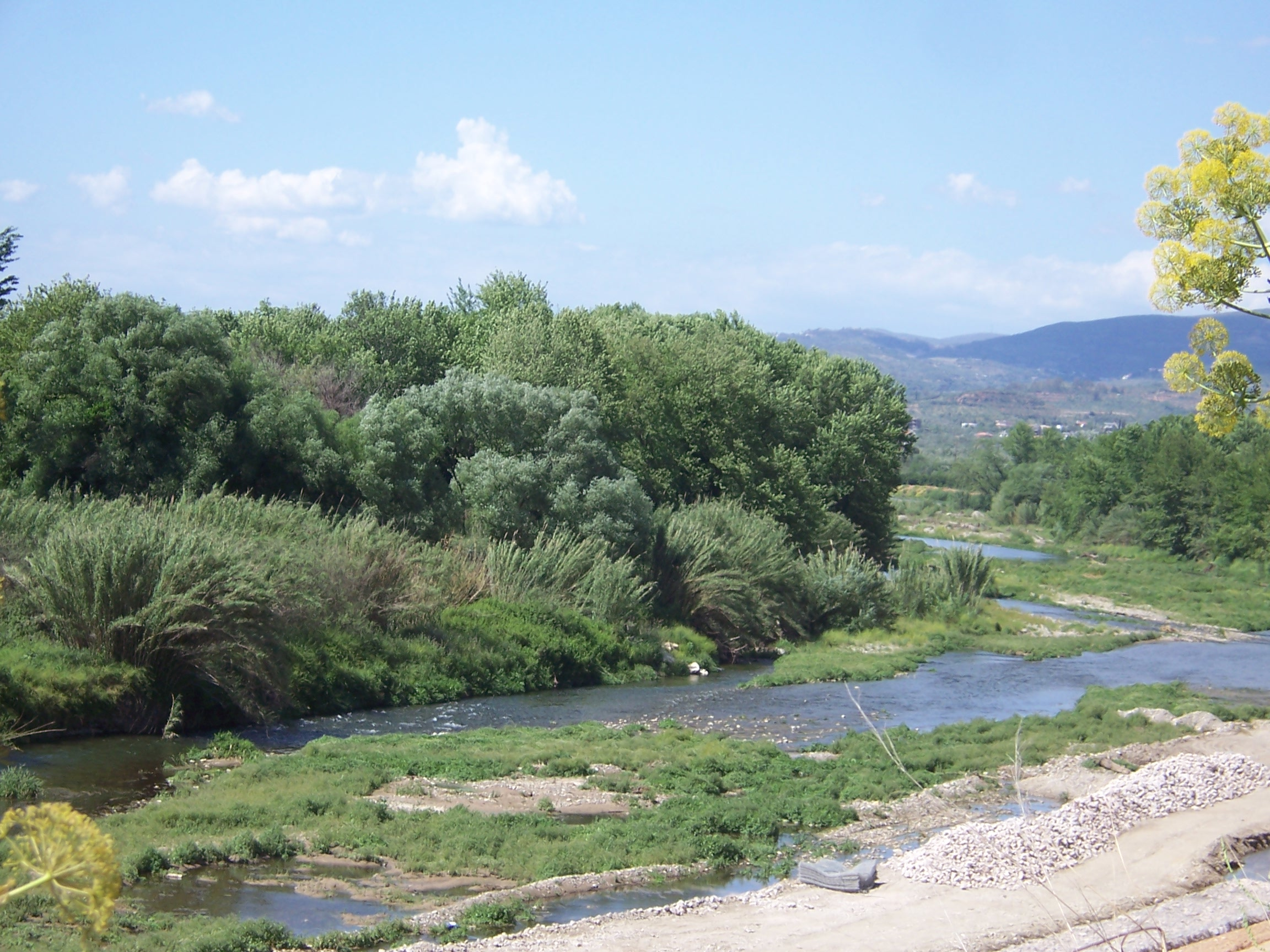
The Evrotas outside Sparta

Beginning in the 13th century, the political and cultural center of Laconia shifted to Mystras, some 4 km to the west. The settlement at ancient Sparta, named Lacedaemonia, continued to exist, although greatly depopulated, until modern times as a town of a few thousand people who lived among the ruins, in the shadow of Mystras. The Palaiologos family (the last Byzantine Greek imperial dynasty) also lived in Mystras. The Despotate of the Morea was captured by the Ottomans under Mehmed II in 1460.

In 1834, after the Greek War of Independence, King Otto of Greece decreed the town should be expanded into a city. Modern-day Sparta, the capital of the prefecture of Lakonia, lies on the eastern foothills of Mount Taygetos in the Evrotas River valley. The city has been built upon the site of ancient Sparta, whose Acropolis lies north of the modern city. To the southwest stands Mt. Taygetos. To the east of the city stands the Parnonas mountain range, which is forested predominantly with Greek fir trees and other conifers.

The municipality was formed on 21 March 1835, and officially declared the Municipality of Sparta in 1845. It was transferred from Laconia to Lacedaemon Province in 1899, but this was reversed in 1909. The city hall was constructed in 1872 during the tenure of Mayor Emmanuel Meletopoulos.

Today, Sparta maintains large squares and wide streets lined with trees, while many of the older buildings remain in excellent condition. The city of Sparta is the economic, administrative and cultural center of Lakonia. A key factor in the advancement of the city's development is the operation of two departments of the University of Peloponnese and a department of the Technological Educational Institute.

The centrally located main square is dominated by the most imposing neo-classical building in Sparta, the City Hall. Built in 1909, City Hall bears the signature of the Greek architect G. Katsaros. During the monarchy (which was abolished by referendum in 1973), the title of Duke of Sparta was used for the Greek crown prince, the διάδοχος (diádokhos).

== Municipality ==
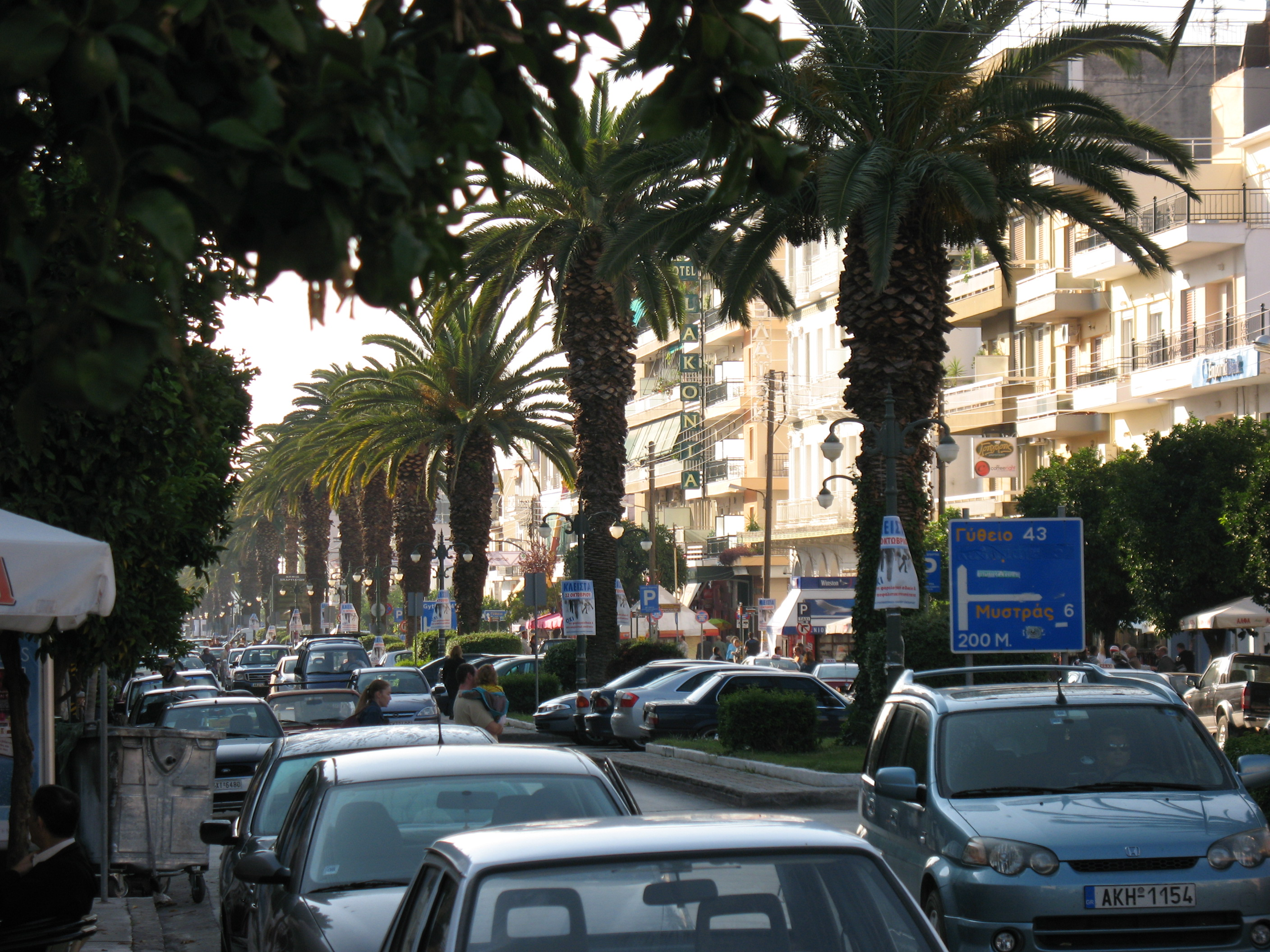
View of a street

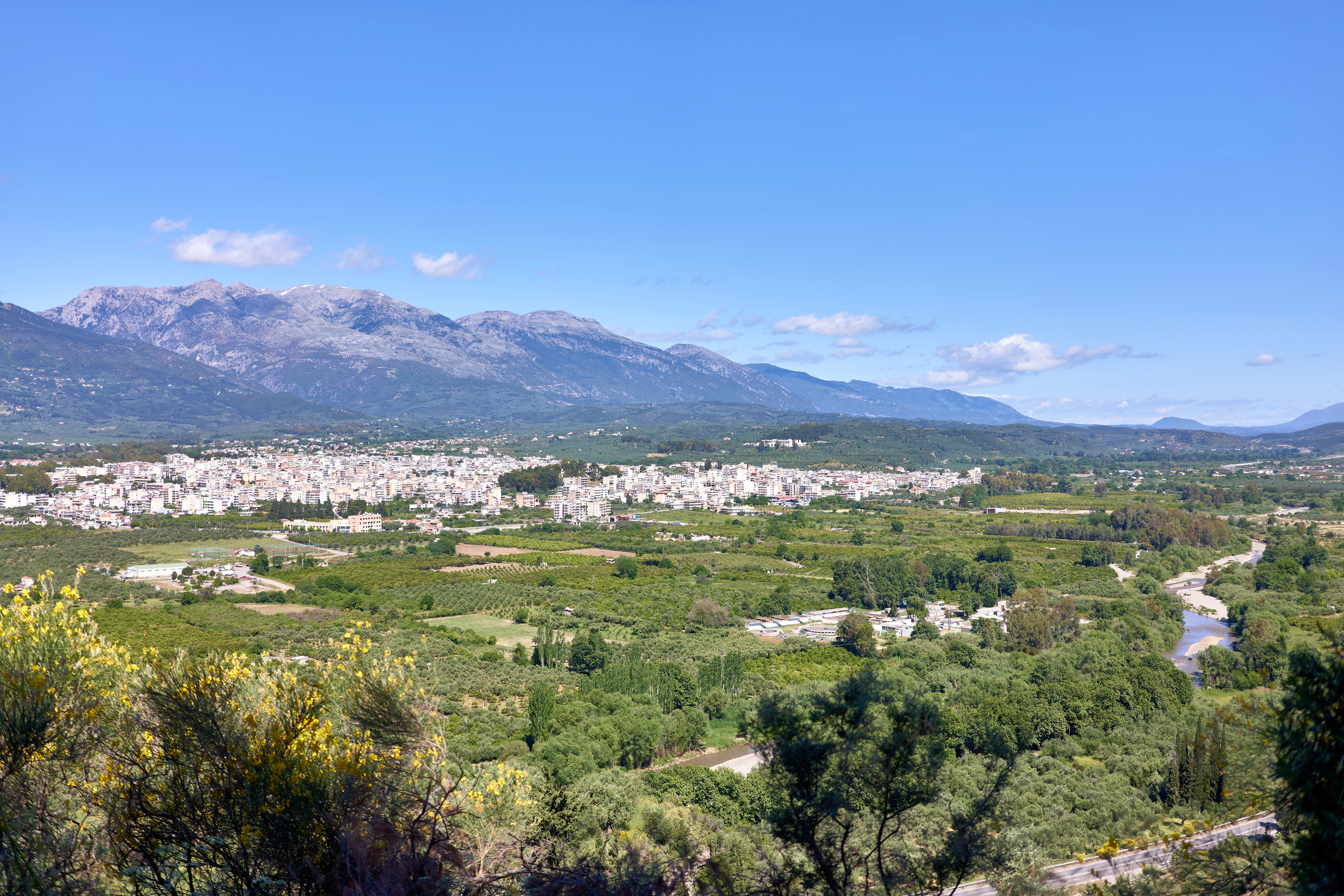
Landscape view of the Evrotas Valley from the Menelaion

The municipality of Sparta was formed at the 2011 local government reform by the merger of the following seven former municipalities, that became municipal units:

- Faris
- Karyes
- Mystras
- Oinountas
- Pellana
- Sparta
- Therapnes

The municipality has an area of 1,181.780 km^{2}, the municipal unit 84.453 km^{2}. The municipal unit consists of the local communities Sparta, Afisi, Amykles, Kalyvia Sochas and Kladas.

=== Politics ===
Petros Doukas, who served from 2019 to 2023, was affiliated with New Democracy. Michalis Vakalopoulos was elected mayor of Sparta in 2023 as a member of the Sparta Together coalition.

#	Party	Mayor	Term start	Term end	Notes	Reference
1		Emmanuel Meletopoulos	1837	1879	Longest serving mayor	
2		Adamantios Roussopoulos	1879	1895		
3		Pericles Salvaras	1895	1903		
4		Elias Kopanitsas	1907	1914		
5		Lymberopoulos	1914	1925		
6		Dimitrios Mylonakos	1925	1926	Died in office	
7		Elias Gortsologos	1926	1941		
8		Gr. Petrakos	1941	1945		
9		Ioannis Kontoulakos	1946	1948		
10		Petros Xanthakos	1948	1950		
11		George Minakakis	1950	1951		
12		Ioannis Kontoulakos	1951	1955		
13		Venizelos Zerveas	1955	1964		
14		George Sainopoulos	1964	1967		
15		Georgios Linardakis	1967	1974	Appointed by Greek junta	
16		Andreas Markakis	1974	1975	Appointed by government of Konstantinos Karamanlis	
17		George Sainopoulos	1975	1978		
18		Nikolaos Sahamis	1978	1986		
19		Paraskevas-Demosthenis Matala	1987	1998		
20		Paraskevas-Demosthenis Matala	1998	2002		
21		Sarantos Antonakos	2003	2010	Resigned due to health issues and died the same year	
22		Christos Patsilivas	2010	2010		
23		Stavros Argeitakos	2011	2014		
24		Evangelos Valiotis	2014	2019		
25		Petros Doukas	2019	2023		
26		Michalis Vakalopoulos	2023			

=== Demographics ===
Year	Town	Municipal unit	Municipality
1961	10,412	—	—
1981	12,975	—	—
1991	13,011	16,322	—
2001	14,817	19,567	—
2011	17,408	19,854	35,259
2021	17,773	19,865	32,786

== Climate ==
The city of Sparta enjoys a sunny and warm Mediterranean climate (Köppen: Csa). January highs are around 15 °C (59 °F) while July and August highs are over 36 °C (97 °F) in the city proper. Sparta records among the highest summer average maximum temperatures in Greece (together with Skala, Messenia). The highest temperature ever recorded in Sparta is 45.7 °C (114.3 °F) in August 2021. On average, Sparta records 6 days per year with temperatures of over 40.0 °C (104.0 °F). In June 2024, Sparta recorded an astonishing mean max temperature of 37.6 °C (99.7 °F). In July 2024 the HNMS station in Sparta registered a record average maximum temperature of 38.6 °C (101.5 °F) while the NOA station registered 38.46 °C (101.2 °F). In July 2025 the NOA station reached a record mean maximum temperature of 38.50 °C (101.3 °F).

Climate data for Sparta 180 m a.s.l
Month	Jan	Feb	Mar	Apr	May	Jun	Jul	Aug	Sep	Oct	Nov	Dec	Year
Record high °C (°F)	23.5 (74.3)	26.4 (79.5)	27.2 (81.0)	34.1 (93.4)	40.7 (105.3)	44.4 (111.9)	44.2 (111.6)	45.7 (114.3)	40.3 (104.5)	36.4 (97.5)	30.8 (87.4)	23.5 (74.3)	45.7 (114.3)
Mean daily maximum °C (°F)	14.6 (58.3)	15.9 (60.6)	18.6 (65.5)	22.9 (73.2)	27.8 (82.0)	32.9 (91.2)	36.3 (97.3)	36.0 (96.8)	31.3 (88.3)	25.5 (77.9)	20.2 (68.4)	16.0 (60.8)	24.8 (76.7)
Daily mean °C (°F)	8.9 (48.0)	9.9 (49.8)	12.1 (53.8)	15.5 (59.9)	20.0 (68.0)	24.9 (76.8)	28.0 (82.4)	27.8 (82.0)	23.9 (75.0)	18.6 (65.5)	14.0 (57.2)	10.2 (50.4)	17.8 (64.1)
Mean daily minimum °C (°F)	3.1 (37.6)	3.9 (39.0)	5.6 (42.1)	8.1 (46.6)	12.2 (54.0)	16.9 (62.4)	19.7 (67.5)	19.7 (67.5)	16.4 (61.5)	11.7 (53.1)	7.8 (46.0)	4.4 (39.9)	10.8 (51.4)
Record low °C (°F)	−5.3 (22.5)	−4.2 (24.4)	−4.6 (23.7)	−0.7 (30.7)	6.2 (43.2)	9.4 (48.9)	14.2 (57.6)	13.1 (55.6)	9.1 (48.4)	1.5 (34.7)	−1.7 (28.9)	−5.2 (22.6)	−5.3 (22.5)
Average rainfall mm (inches)	124.6 (4.91)	80.5 (3.17)	59.9 (2.36)	32.2 (1.27)	25.1 (0.99)	32.0 (1.26)	10.4 (0.41)	19.9 (0.78)	51.2 (2.02)	59.4 (2.34)	91.9 (3.62)	97.4 (3.83)	684.5 (26.96)
Source: National Observatory of Athens (Feb 2009 - Aug 2025), Sparta N.O.A station, World Meteorological Organization

Climate data for Sparta Air Base (HNMS, 1974–2004)
Month	Jan	Feb	Mar	Apr	May	Jun	Jul	Aug	Sep	Oct	Nov	Dec	Year
Mean daily maximum °C (°F)	14.4 (57.9)	15.1 (59.2)	17.7 (63.9)	21.3 (70.3)	27.0 (80.6)	32.2 (90.0)	34.8 (94.6)	34.3 (93.7)	30.5 (86.9)	25.7 (78.3)	19.4 (66.9)	15.2 (59.4)	24.0 (75.1)
Daily mean °C (°F)	9.6 (49.3)	10.2 (50.4)	12.4 (54.3)	15.8 (60.4)	21.2 (70.2)	26.2 (79.2)	28.5 (83.3)	27.8 (82.0)	24.2 (75.6)	19.6 (67.3)	14.2 (57.6)	10.8 (51.4)	18.4 (65.1)
Mean daily minimum °C (°F)	3.5 (38.3)	3.8 (38.8)	5.5 (41.9)	7.6 (45.7)	11.8 (53.2)	15.9 (60.6)	18.7 (65.7)	18.0 (64.4)	15.3 (59.5)	12.3 (54.1)	8.2 (46.8)	5.1 (41.2)	10.5 (50.9)
Average rainfall mm (inches)	90.7 (3.57)	84.6 (3.33)	73.3 (2.89)	66.0 (2.60)	47.4 (1.87)	14.6 (0.57)	18.8 (0.74)	26.4 (1.04)	30.8 (1.21)	54.6 (2.15)	90.0 (3.54)	107.9 (4.25)	705.1 (27.76)
Source: Meteoclub.gr

== Tourism ==
=== Main sites ===
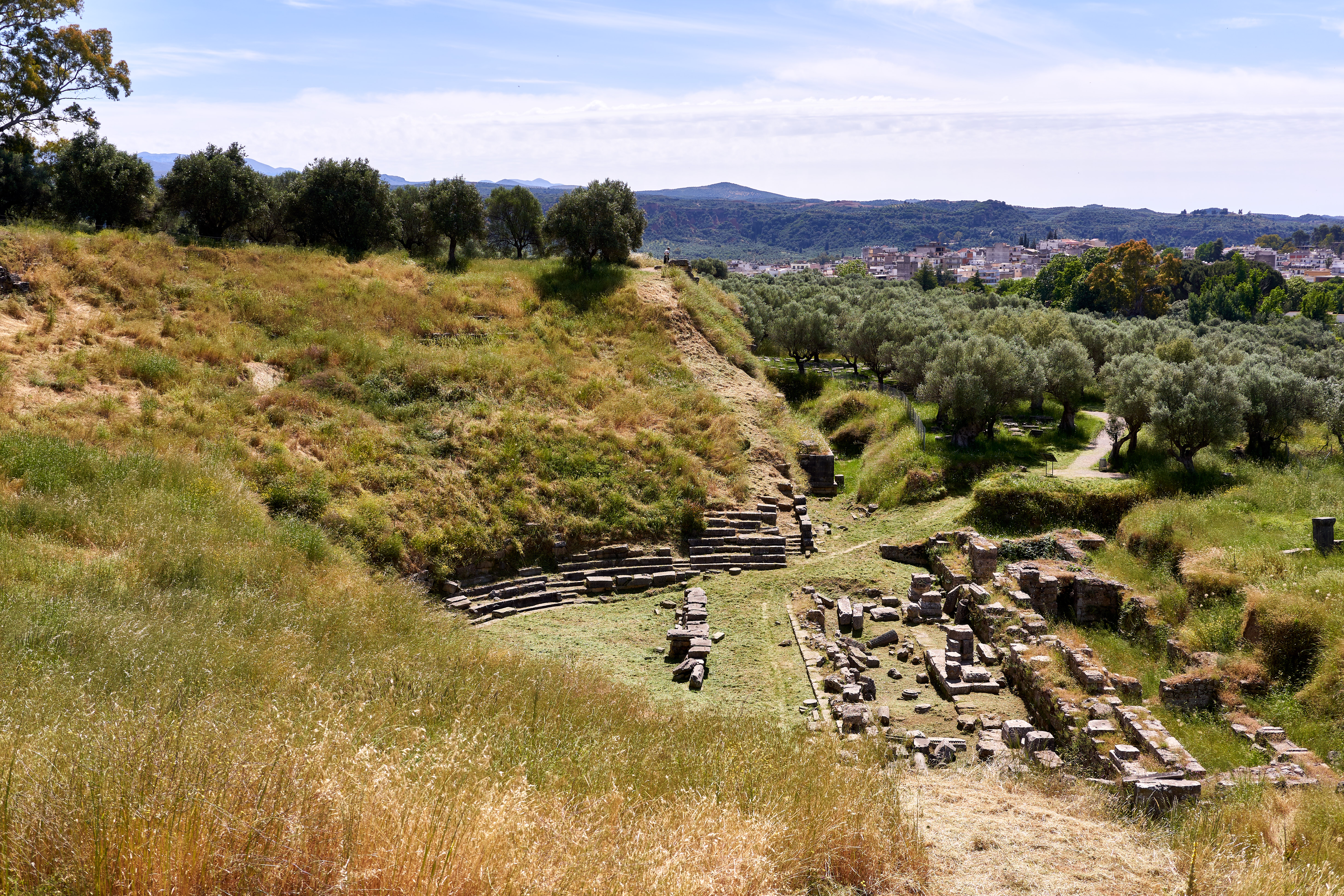
The theater of ancient Sparta with Parnon in the background

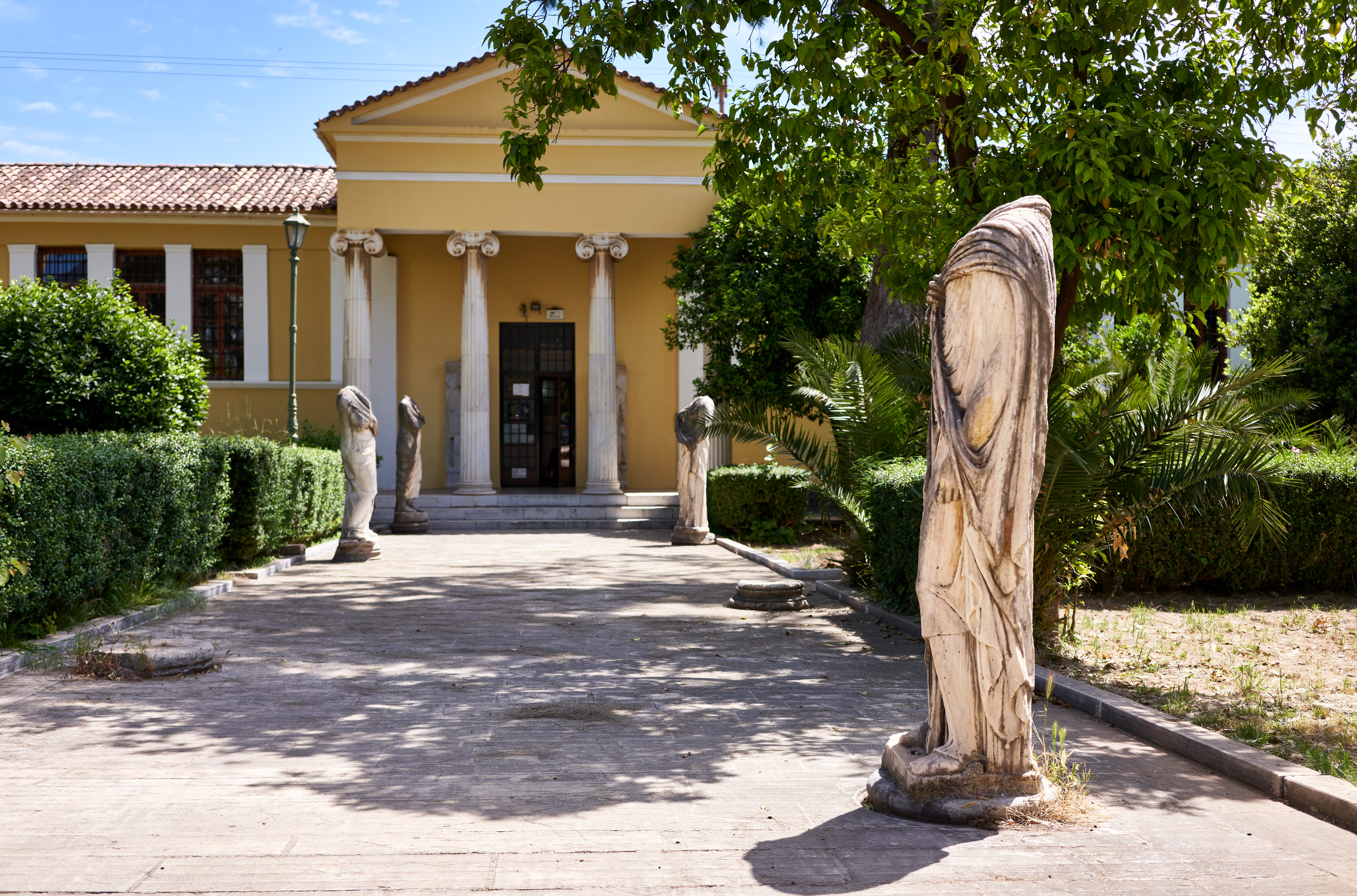
Archaeological Museum of Sparta

In the center of the city is the Archaeological Museum. Built by architect G. Katsaros, in 1874–76 to house the collection of local archaeological finds by Panagiotis Stamatakis, it was the first Greek museum in a provincial city.

The city's cathedral is at the southwest end.

The ruins of ancient Sparta lie north of the city. Entering by the South Gate of the Acropolis, known as Lakedaemonia, there is the Rotunda, the Theatre and the Temple of Athena Chalkioikos to the West. Exiting the Acropolis by the North Gate there are the remains of the earliest ancient walls, the Heroon and the Altar of Lycourgos, whereas to the East there is the Sanctuary of Artemis Orthia. To the North is the Monastic Church of Osios Nikonas (10th century).

The "Tomb of Leonidas", or Leonidaion (37.0767°N 22.4254°E), is a limestone structure of the late 5th century BC, likely a temple, but named for Leonidas I in the 19th century, being the only ancient monument indicated within the limits of the newly planned town in 1834.

=== Museums ===
- Archaeological Museum of Sparta
- The Museum of the Olive and Greek Olive Oil in the South West end highlights the culture of the olive and the technology of olive production, 129 Othonos–Amalias Street
- Archaeological Museum of Mystras, founded by Gabriel Lilianthal in the late 19th century
- The Manousakeio Museum of urban and folk life
- Koumantareios Art Gallery of Sparta
- Angakis Art Gallery

== Sports ==
The Spartathlon has taken place every September since 1983. It is an ultramarathon starting in Athens and finishing in Sparta at the statue of Leonidas, with many international participants.

The local football club of Sparta, Laconia was Sparta F.C. The club dissolved in 2019.

== Notable people ==
- Leonidas Arniotis (1862–1939), entertainer, theatre director and mechanic
- Nikiforos Vrettakos (1912–1991), writer and poet
- Babis Petrakos (born 1991), footballer

== Twin towns – sister cities ==
Sparta is twinned with:

- Taranto, Italy
- Morphou, Cyprus
- Lapithos, Cyprus
- Sopron, Hungary
- Le Plessis-Trévise, France
- Salamanca, Spain
- Stamford, United States
- Tanagura, Japan
- Brunswick (Melbourne), Australia
