= Kastania, Laconia =

Kastania Καστάνια
- Community
- Location within Greece
- Coordinates: 36.842°N 22.400°E
- Country: Greece
- Administrative region: Peloponnese
- Regional unit: Laconia
- Municipality: East Mani
- Municipal unit: Sminos

Population (2021)
  - Community: 55
- Time zone: UTC+2 (EET)
  - Summer (DST): UTC+3 (EEST)

Kastania (Greek: Καστάνια) is a village on the Mani Peninsula of Laconia in Greece. An independent community since 1912, it became part of the municipality of Sminos in 1997, which in turn became part of the municipality of East Mani in 2010.

== Geography ==
Kastania is 28 km northwestern of Gytheio at the southeastern slopes of mount Taygetos. The village is also named locally Kastanitza (Greek: Καστανίτζα) or Mikri Kastania (Greek: Μικρή Καστάνια). Within the village is the historic Church of the Metamorphosis. At the village entrance is an impressive war memorial. A short distance below the village is the early Christian chapel of Ayios Stratiyas. Overlooking the village from its mountainous perch is the impressive Monastery of Panayia Yiatrissa.

== History ==
After the Orlov Revolt of 1770 failed, the Ottomans wanted to punish the Klephts for participating. In the 1780 siege of Kastania, the Ottoman commander Ali Bey, on orders from Cezayirli Gazi Hasan Pasha, besieged the two Maniot pyrgoi (fighting towers) which belonged to the Venetsanakis clan.

Ali Bey laid siege to the pyrgoi. After holding out for ten days, the defenders attempted to flee at night through the neighboring forests. Only a few broke through the Ottoman lines, among them the wife and ten-year-old son of Konstantinos Kolokotronis. The boy, Theodoros Kolokotronis, escaped and would later become a prominent leader of the Greek War of Independence, which began in 1821.
